= Bucharest =

Capital and largest city of Romania

Bucharest București
- Capital city and municipality
- City of Bucharest
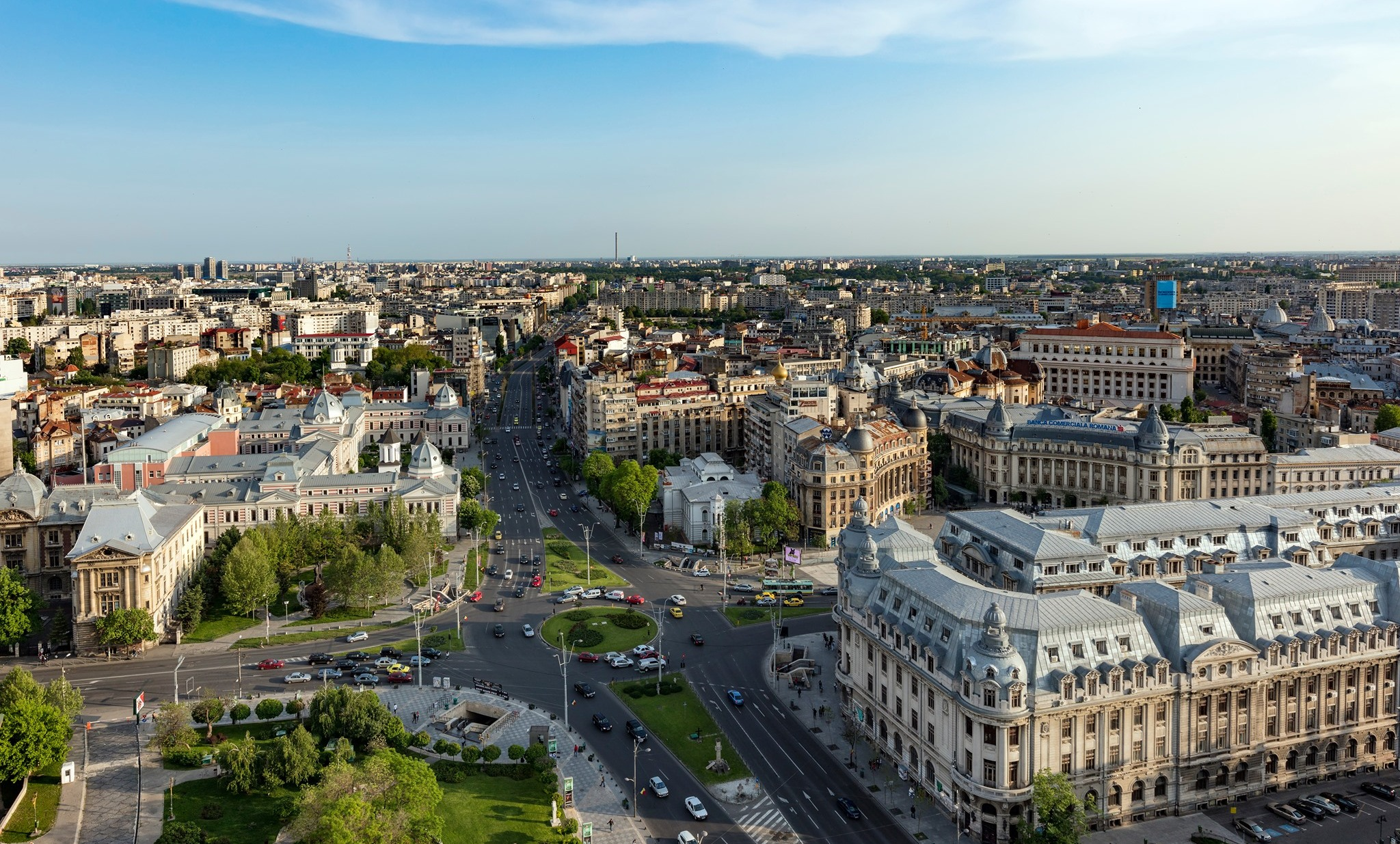
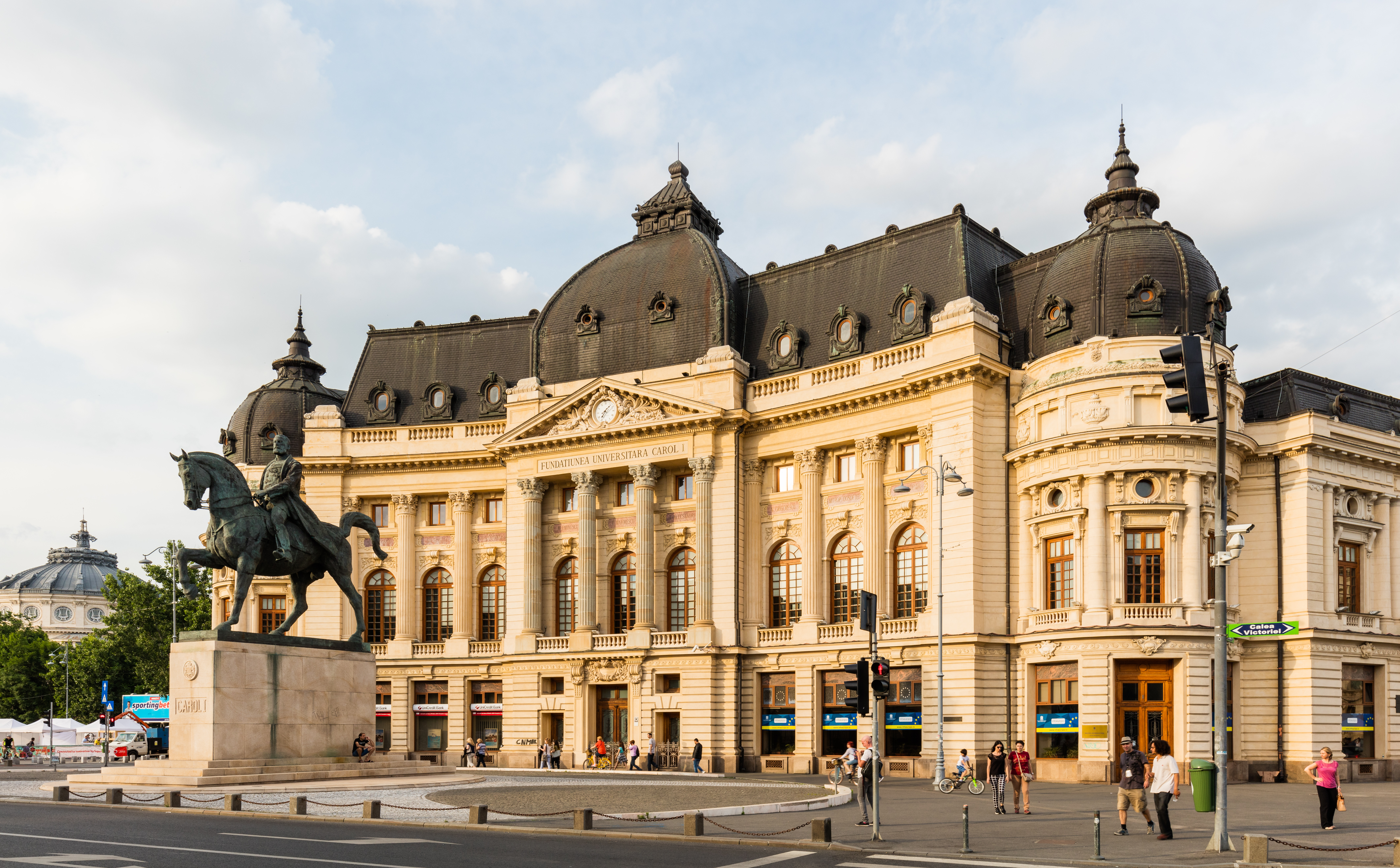
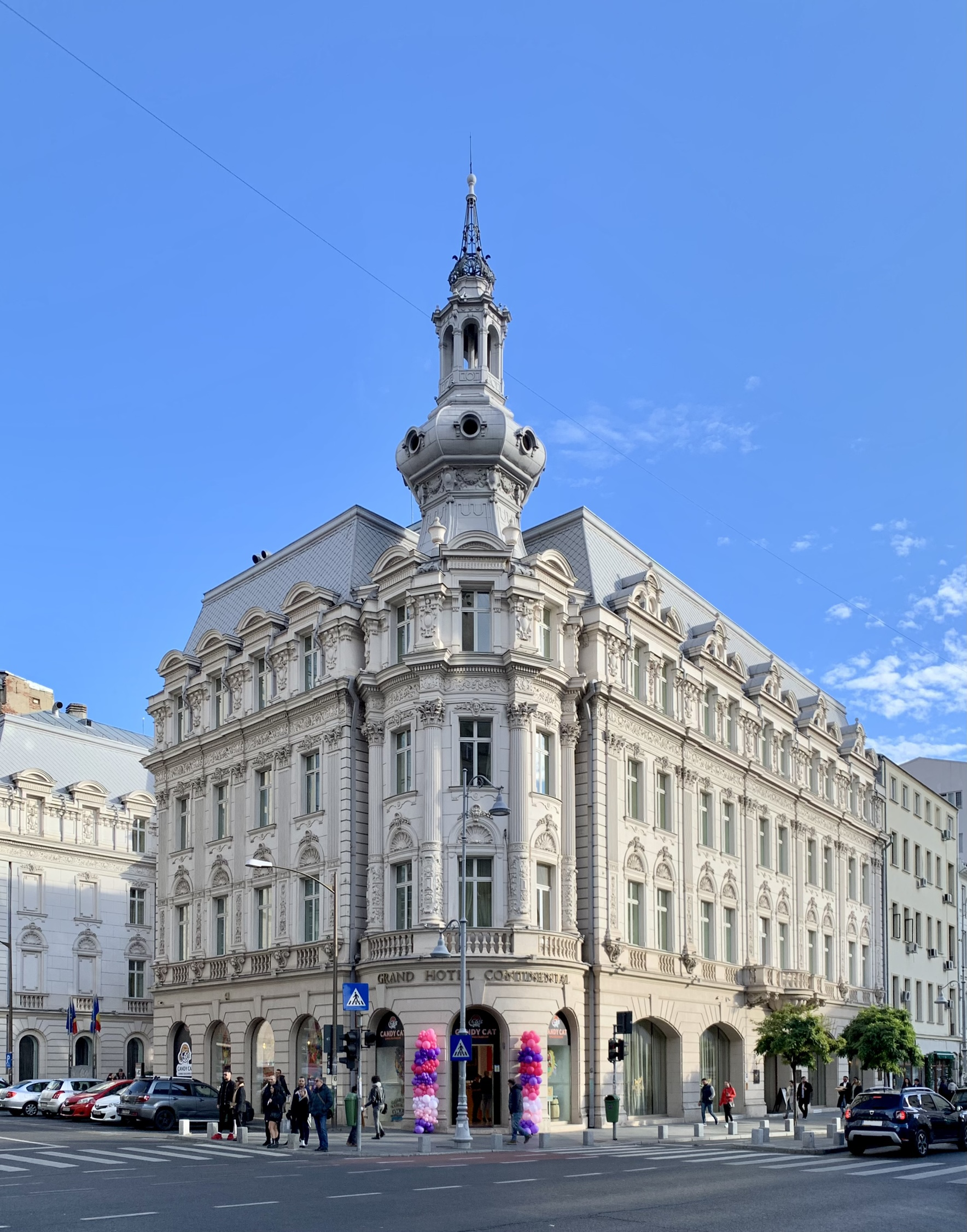
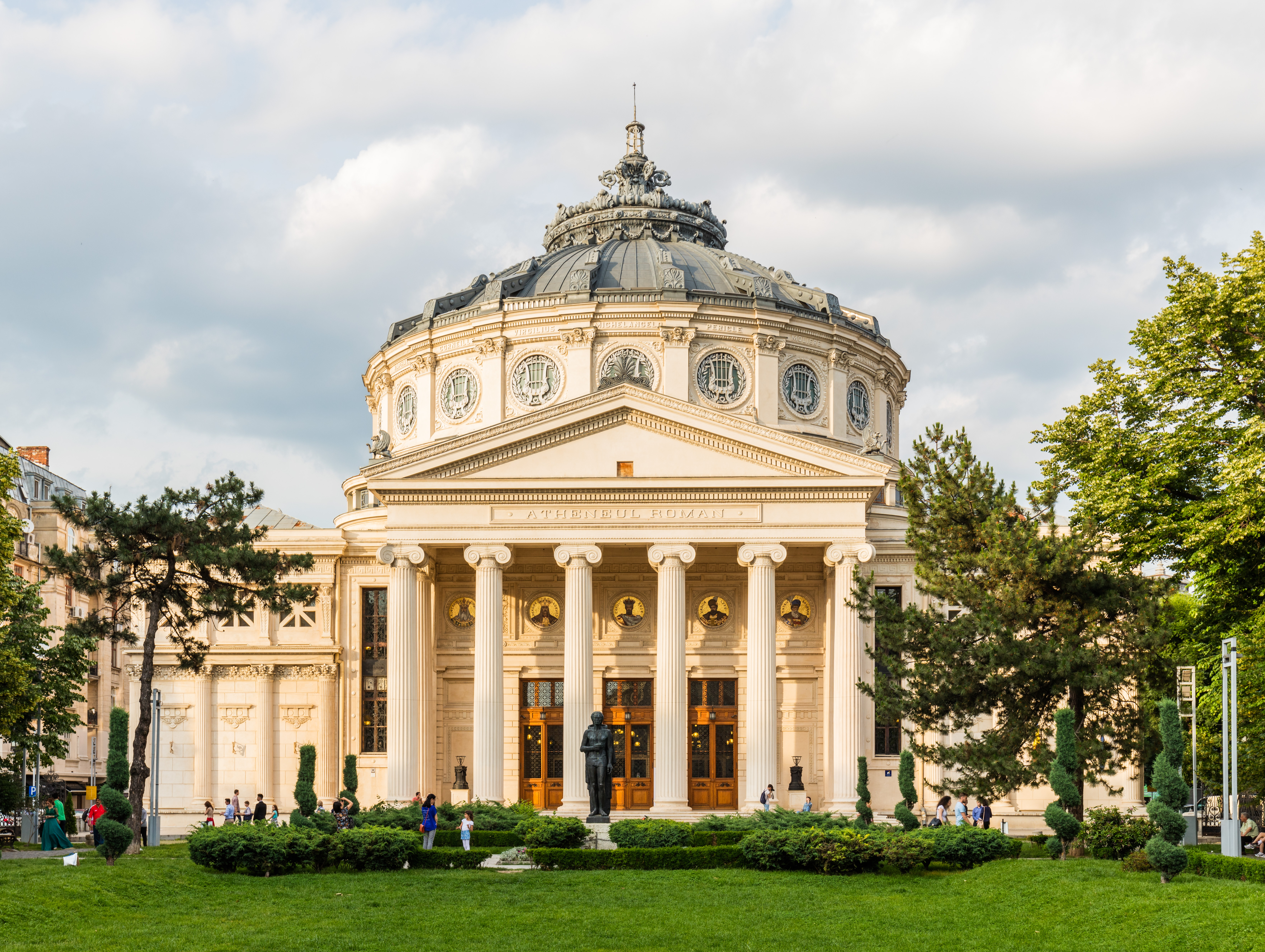
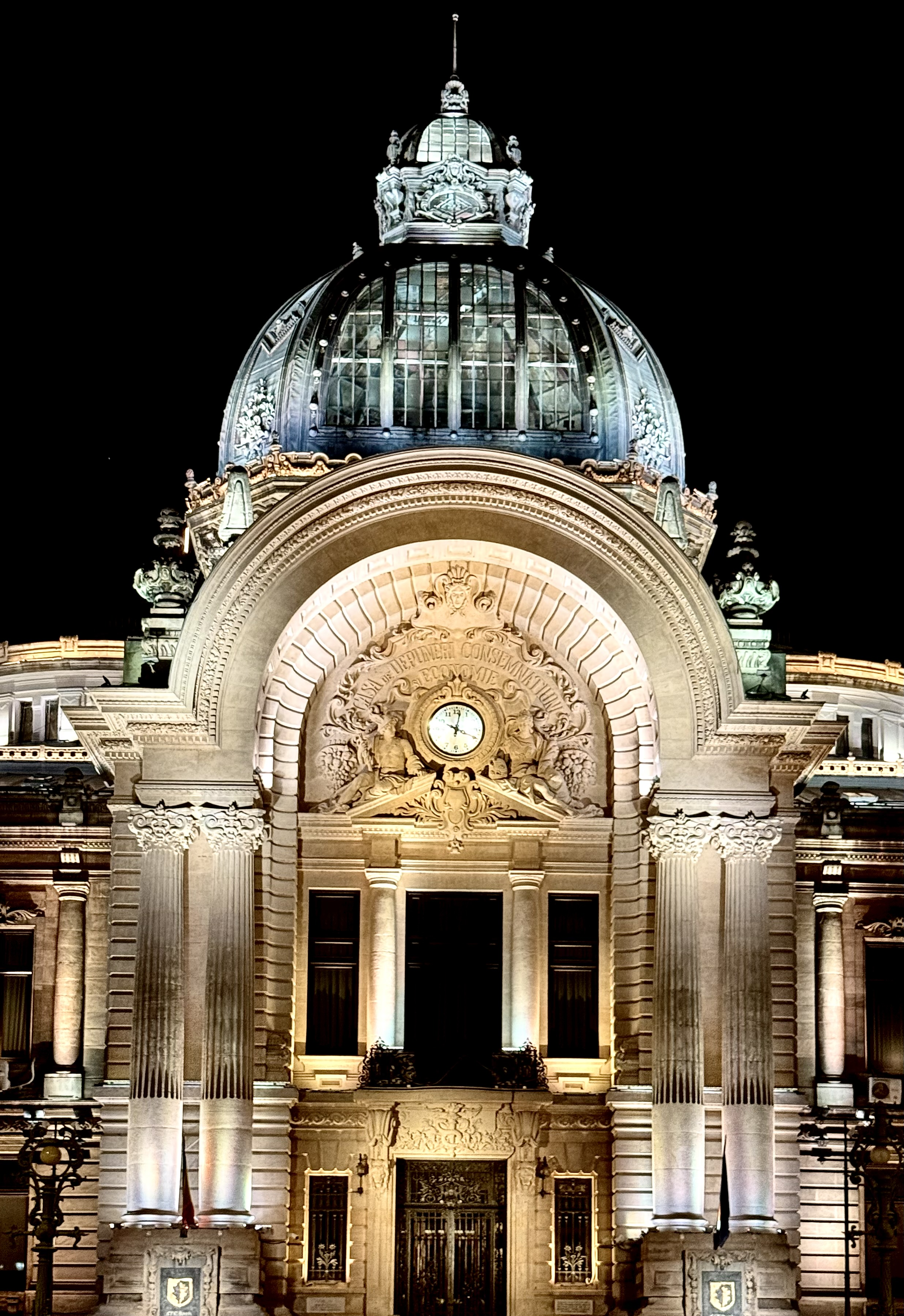
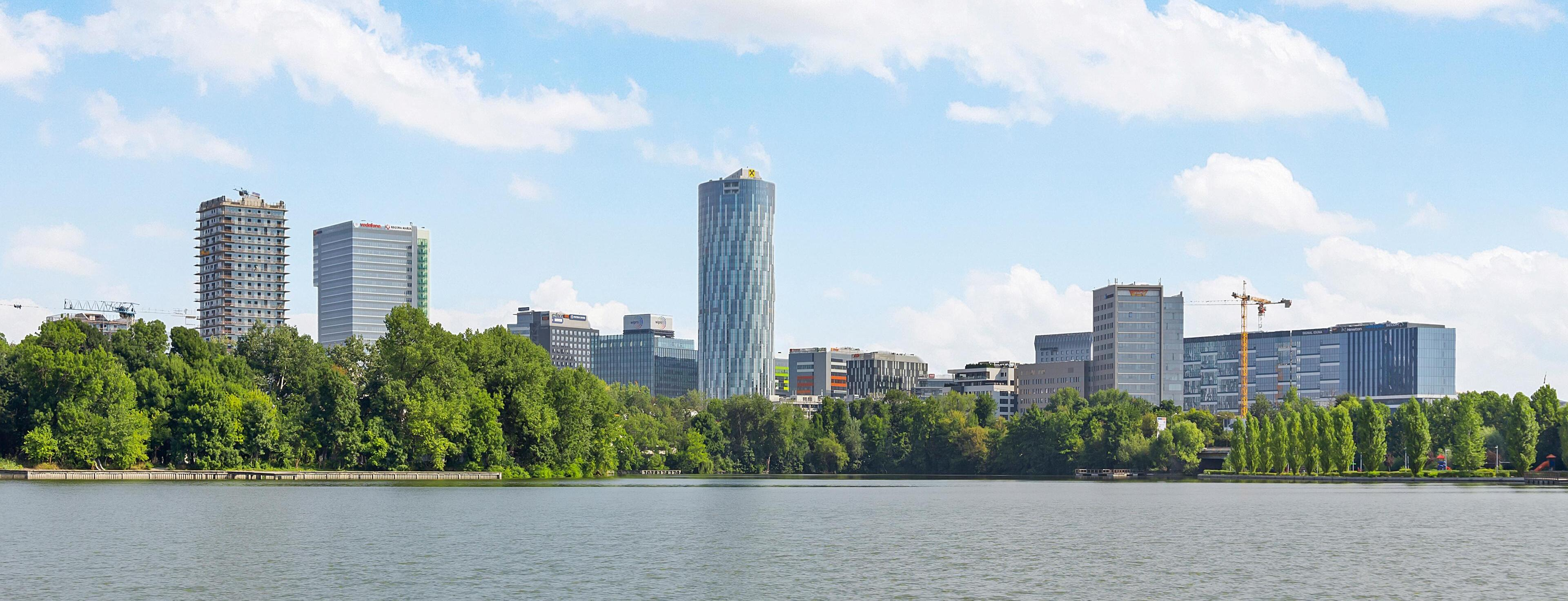
- University Square Central University Library Calea Victoriei Arcul de Triumf Romanian Athenaeum Palace of the Parliament CEC Palace The Floreasca District

- Flag Coat of arms Logo
- Nicknames: Paris of the East / Little Paris
- Motto: Patria și dreptul meu ('The Homeland and my right')
- Interactive map of Bucharest
- Location of Bucharest in Romania Bucharest (Europe)
- Coordinates: 44°25′57″N 26°6′14″E
- Country: Romania
- Development region: București - Ilfov
- County: Municipality of Bucharest
- First attested: 1459
- Founder: Vlad the Impaler
- Sectors: 6 sectors

Government
  - Type: Strong Mayor–Council
  - Mayor: Ciprian Ciucu
  - Legislature: General Council
  - EP: Bucharest constituency

Area
  - Capital city and municipality: 239 km^{2} (92 sq mi)
  - Metro: 1,803 km^{2} (696 sq mi)
- Elevation: 55.8–91.5 m (183–300 ft)

Population (2021 census)
  - Capital city and municipality: 1,883,425 (city proper)
  - Estimate (January 2026): 1,713,832 (city proper)
  - Rank: 1st in Romania (15th in Europe)
  - Density: 7,171/km^{2} (18,570/sq mi)
  - Metro (Bucharest-Ilfov): 2,333,293
  - Metro density: 1,294/km^{2} (3,350/sq mi)
- Demonyms: bucureștean, bucureșteancă (ro)

GDP (Nominal, 2025)
  - Capital city and municipality: RON504.9 billion (€100.2 billion)
  - Per capita: €58,716
  - Metro: RON560.7 billion (€111.3 billion)
- Time zone: UTC+02:00 (EET)
  - Summer (DST): UTC+03:00 (EEST)
- Postal code: 0100xx-0201xx, 0201xx-0300xx, 0365xx
- Area code: +40 31
- HDI (2024): 0.940 – very high
- Rapid transit system: Metro
- International Airports: Băneasa Airport; Otopeni Airport
- Website: www.pmb.ro

Bucharest (Note: UK: /ˌbuːkəˈrɛst/ BOO-kə-REST, US: /ˈbuːkərɛst/ -rest) (Romanian: București [bukuˈreʃtʲ]) is the capital and largest city of Romania. The metropolis stands on the River Dâmbovița in south-eastern Romania. Its population is officially estimated at 1.71 million residents within a greater metropolitan area of 2.33 million residents, which makes Bucharest the fifteenth-largest city in Europe. The city has an area of 239 km^{2} (92 sq mi), while the metropolitan area covers 1,803 km^{2} (696 sq mi). The city proper is administratively known as the "Municipality of Bucharest" (Romanian: Municipiul București), and has the same administrative level as that of a national county, being further subdivided into six sectors, each governed by a local mayor. Bucharest is a major cultural, political and economic hub, it is the country's seat of government, and it is an enclave completely surrounded by Ilfov County.

Bucharest was first mentioned in 1459, and became a centre of Wallachian commerce and governance in the 16th and 17th centuries. The city became the capital of the Romanian United Principalities in 1862, and boomed after the 1881 founding of the Romanian Kingdom. In the following decades, the city became known for its cosmopolitanism and eclectic architecture, being nicknamed "Paris of the East". However, it was severely damaged in the Second World War. Under the Socialist Republic of Romania, the city again grew massively in population and area, especially through new urban developments characterised by socialist architecture and planning, particularly Nicolae Ceaușescu's program of systematization. In recent years, the city has been experiencing an economic and cultural boom. It is one of the fastest-growing high-tech cities in Europe.

Bucharest is by far the most populous city of Romania, having reached one million inhabitants in the 1940s. Economically, Bucharest is the most prosperous city in Romania and the richest capital and city in the region, having surpassed Budapest since 2017. In recent years, Bucharest has gained importance as an international tourist destination, in the context of tourism in Romania. The city has a number of large convention facilities, educational institutes, cultural venues, traditional "shopping arcades" and recreational areas.

== Etymology ==
The Romanian name București has an unverified origin. Tradition connects the founding of Bucharest with the name of Bucur, who was a prince, an outlaw, a fisherman, a shepherd or a hunter, according to different legends. In Romanian, the word stem bucurie means 'joy' ('happiness'), hence the city Bucharest means 'city of joy'.

Other etymologies are given by early scholars, including the one of an Ottoman traveller, Evliya Çelebi, who claimed that Bucharest was named after a certain "Abu-Kariș", from the tribe of "Bani-Kureiș". In 1781, Austrian historian Franz Sulzer claimed that it was related to bucurie (joy), bucuros (joyful), or a se bucura (to be joyful), while an early 19th-century book published in Vienna assumed its name to be derived from "Bukovie", a beech forest. In English, the city's name was formerly rendered as Bukarest. A native or resident of Bucharest is called a "Bucharester" (Romanian: bucureștean).

== History ==
Bucharest's history alternated periods of development and decline from the early settlements in antiquity until its consolidation as the national capital of Romania late in the 19th century. First mentioned as the 'Citadel of București' in 1459, it became the residence of the ruler of Wallachia, Voivode Vlad the Impaler.

The Old Princely Court (Curtea Veche) was erected by Mircea Ciobanul in the mid-16th century. Under subsequent rulers, Bucharest was established as the summer residence of the royal court. During the years to come, it competed with Târgoviște on the status of capital city after an increase in the importance of Southern Muntenia brought about by demands of the suzerain power – the Ottoman Empire.

Bucharest finally became the permanent location of the Wallachian court after 1698, starting with the reign of Constantin Brâncoveanu. The city was partly destroyed by natural disasters and rebuilt several times, in the following 200 years.

The Ottomans appointed Greek christian administrators (Phanariotes) to run the town (Ottoman Turkish: بكرش, romanized: Bukreş) from the 18th century. The 1821 Wallachian uprising initiated by Tudor Vladimirescu led to the end of the Phanariotes' rule in Bucharest.

In 1813–14 the city was hit by the Caragea's plague. The city was wrested from Ottoman influence and occupied at several intervals by the Habsburg monarchy (1716, 1737, 1789) and Imperial Russia (three times between 1768 and 1806). It was placed under Russian administration between 1828 and the Crimean War, with an interlude during the Bucharest-centred 1848 Wallachian revolution. Later, an Austrian garrison took possession after the Russian departure (remaining in the city until March 1857). On 23 March 1847, a fire consumed about 2,000 buildings, destroying a third of the city.

In 1862, after Wallachia and Moldavia were united to form the Principality of Romania, Bucharest became the new nation's capital city. In 1881, it became the political centre of the newly proclaimed Kingdom of Romania under King Carol I. During the second half of the 19th century, the city's population increased dramatically, and a new period of urban development began. During this period, gas lighting, horse-drawn trams, and limited electrification were introduced. The Dâmbovița River was also massively channelled in 1883, thus putting a stop to previously endemic floods like the 1865 flooding of Bucharest. The Fortifications of Bucharest were built. The extravagant architecture and cosmopolitan high culture of this period won Bucharest the nickname of "Paris of the East" (Parisul Estului), with the Calea Victoriei as its Champs-Élysées.

Between 6 December 1916 and November 1918, the city was occupied by German forces as a result of the Battle of Bucharest, with the official capital temporarily moved to Iași (also called Jassy), in the Moldavia region. After World War I, Bucharest became the capital of Greater Romania. In the interwar years, Bucharest's urban development continued, with the city gaining an average of 30,000 new residents each year. Also, some of the city's main landmarks were built in this period, including Arcul de Triumf and Palatul Telefoanelor. However, the Great Depression in Romania took its toll on Bucharest's citizens, culminating in the Grivița Strike of 1933.

In January 1941, the city was the scene of the Legionnaires' rebellion and Bucharest pogrom. As the capital of an Axis country and a major transit point for Axis troops en route to the Eastern Front, Bucharest suffered heavy damage during World War II due to Allied bombings. On 23 August 1944, Bucharest was the site of the royal coup which brought Romania into the Allied camp. The city suffered a short period of Nazi Luftwaffe bombings, as well as a failed attempt by German troops to regain the city.

After the establishment of communism in Romania, the city continued growing. New districts were constructed, most of them dominated by tower blocks. During Nicolae Ceaușescu's leadership (1965–89), a part of the historic city was demolished and replaced by 'Socialist realism' style development: (1) the Centrul Civic (the Civic Centre) and (2) the Palace of the Parliament, for which an entire historic quarter was razed to make way for Ceaușescu's megalomaniac plans. On 4 March 1977, an earthquake centred in Vrancea, about 135 km (83.89 mi) away, claimed 1,500 lives and caused further damage to the historic centre.

The Romanian Revolution of 1989 began with massive anti-Ceaușescu protests in Timișoara in December 1989 and continued in Bucharest, leading to the overthrow of the Communist regime. Dissatisfied with the postrevolutionary leadership of the National Salvation Front, some student leagues and opposition groups organised anti-Communist rallies in early 1990, which caused the political change.

Since 2000, the city has been continuously modernised. Residential and commercial developments are underway, particularly in the northern districts; Bucharest's old historic centre has undergone restoration since the mid-2000s.

In 2015, 64 people were killed in the Colectiv nightclub fire. Later the Romanian capital saw the 2017–2019 Romanian protests against the judicial reforms, with a 2018 protest ending with 450 people injured.

=== Treaties ===
The following treaties were signed in the city:

- Treaty of Bucharest (1812), between the Ottoman Empire and the Russian Empire ending the Russo-Turkish War (1806–1812)
- Treaty of Bucharest (1886), between Serbia and Bulgaria ending the Serbian–Bulgarian War
- Treaty of Bucharest (1913), between Bulgaria, Romania, Serbia, Montenegro and Greece ending of the Second Balkan War
- Treaty of Bucharest (1916), a treaty of alliance between Romania and the Entente Powers
- Treaty of Bucharest (1918), between Romania and the Central Powers

== Geography ==
=== General ===
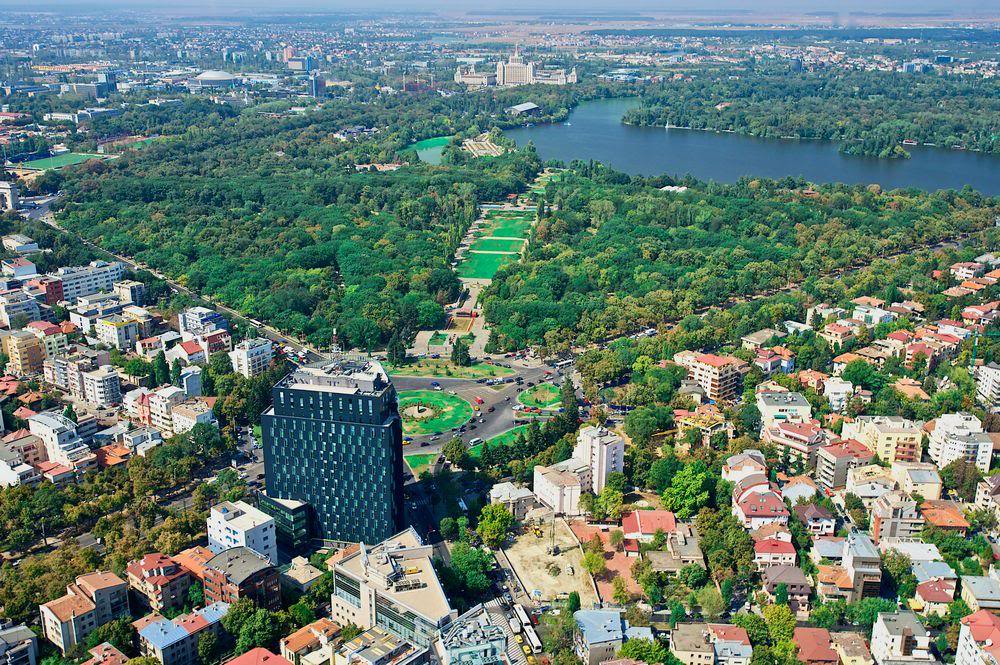
Bucharest is Romania's capital and largest city.

The city is situated on the banks of the Dâmbovița River, which flows into the Argeș River, a tributary of the Danube. Several lakes – the most important of which are Lake Herăstrău, Lake Floreasca, Lake Tei, and Lake Colentina – stretch across the northern parts of the city, along the Colentina River, a tributary of the Dâmbovița. In addition, in the centre of the capital is a small artificial lake – Lake Cișmigiu – surrounded by the Cișmigiu Gardens. These gardens have a rich history, having been frequented by poets and writers. Opened in 1847 and based on the plans of German architect Carl F.W. Meyer, the gardens are the main recreational facility in the city centre.

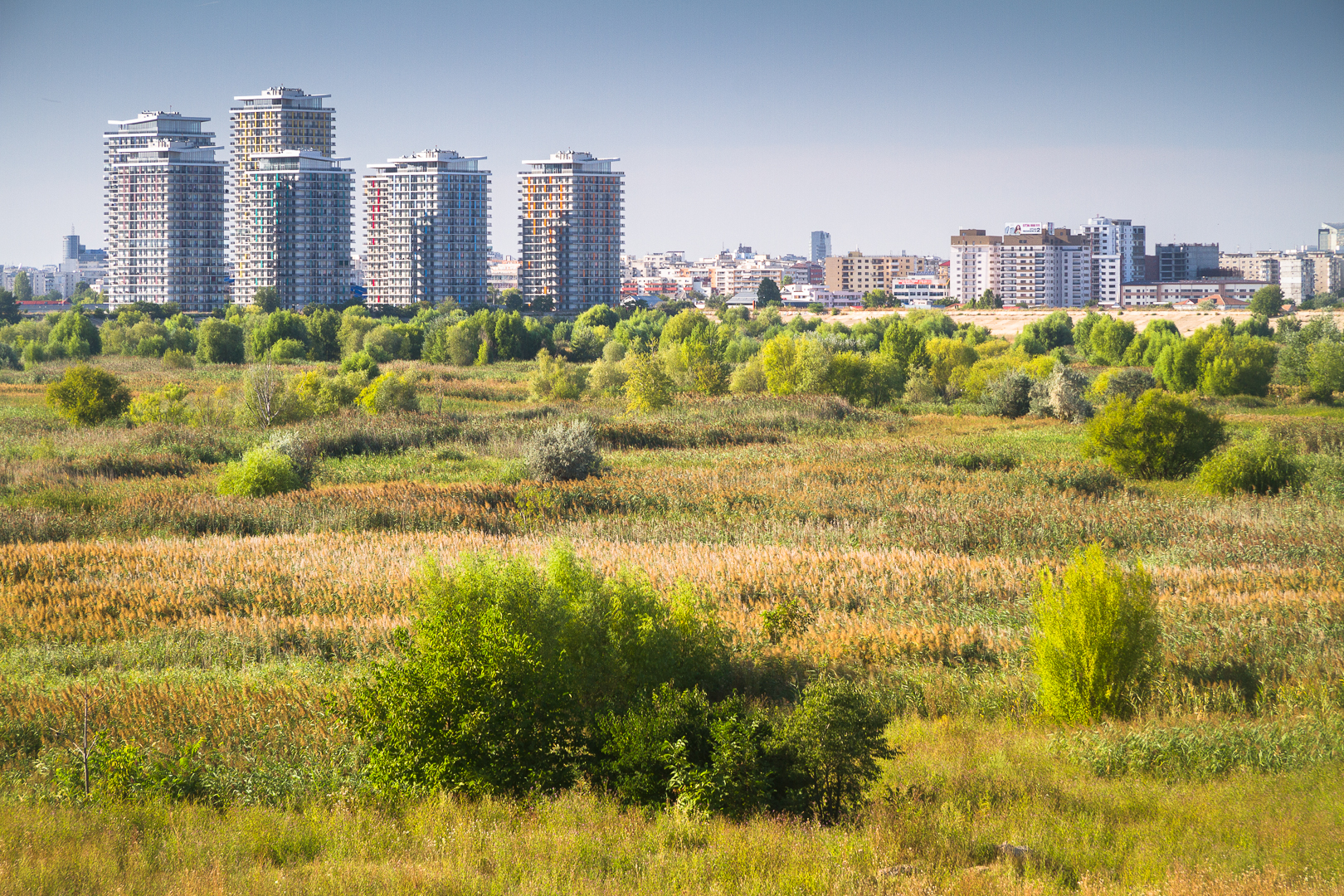
Văcărești Nature Park

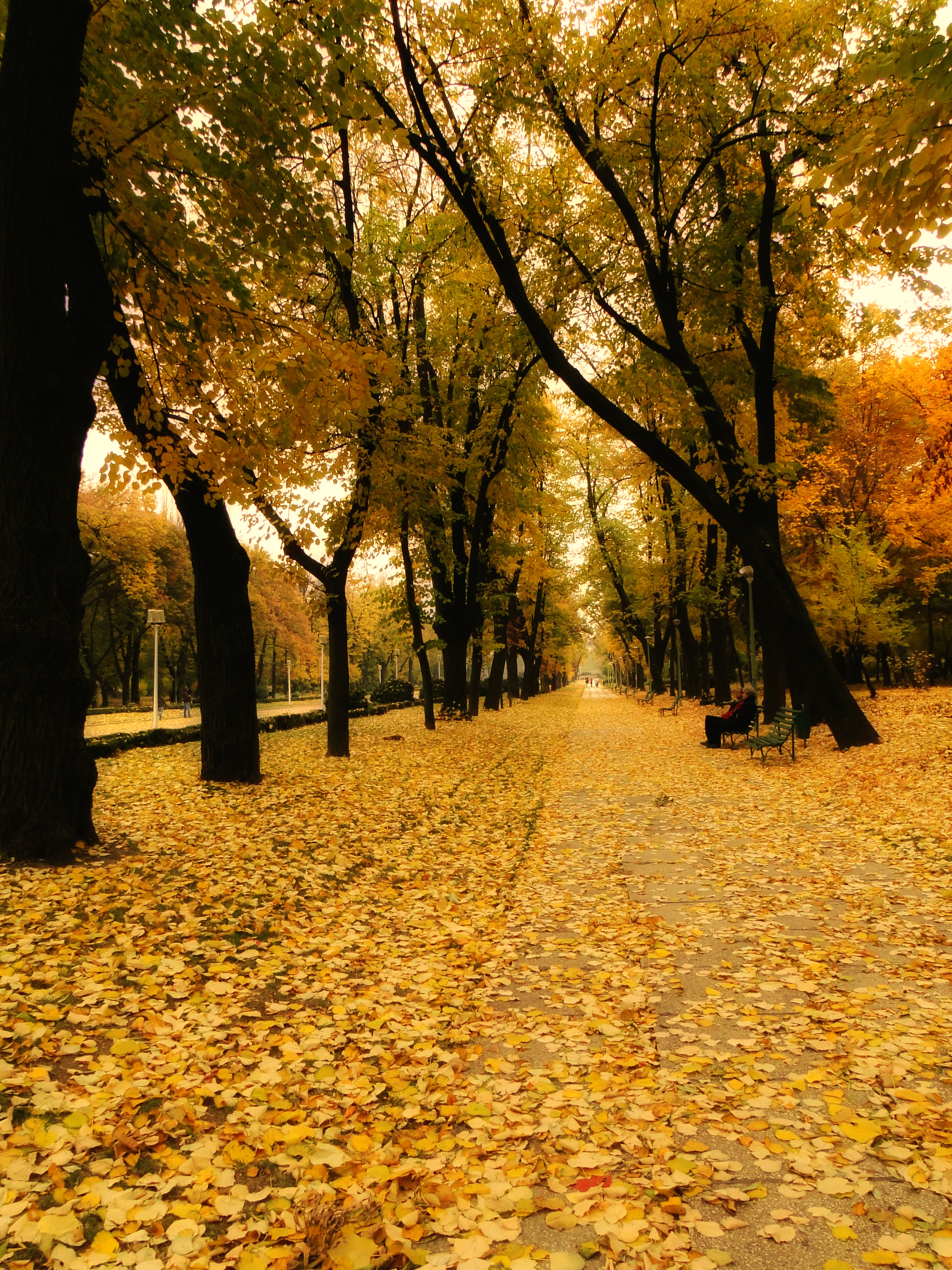
Carol Park

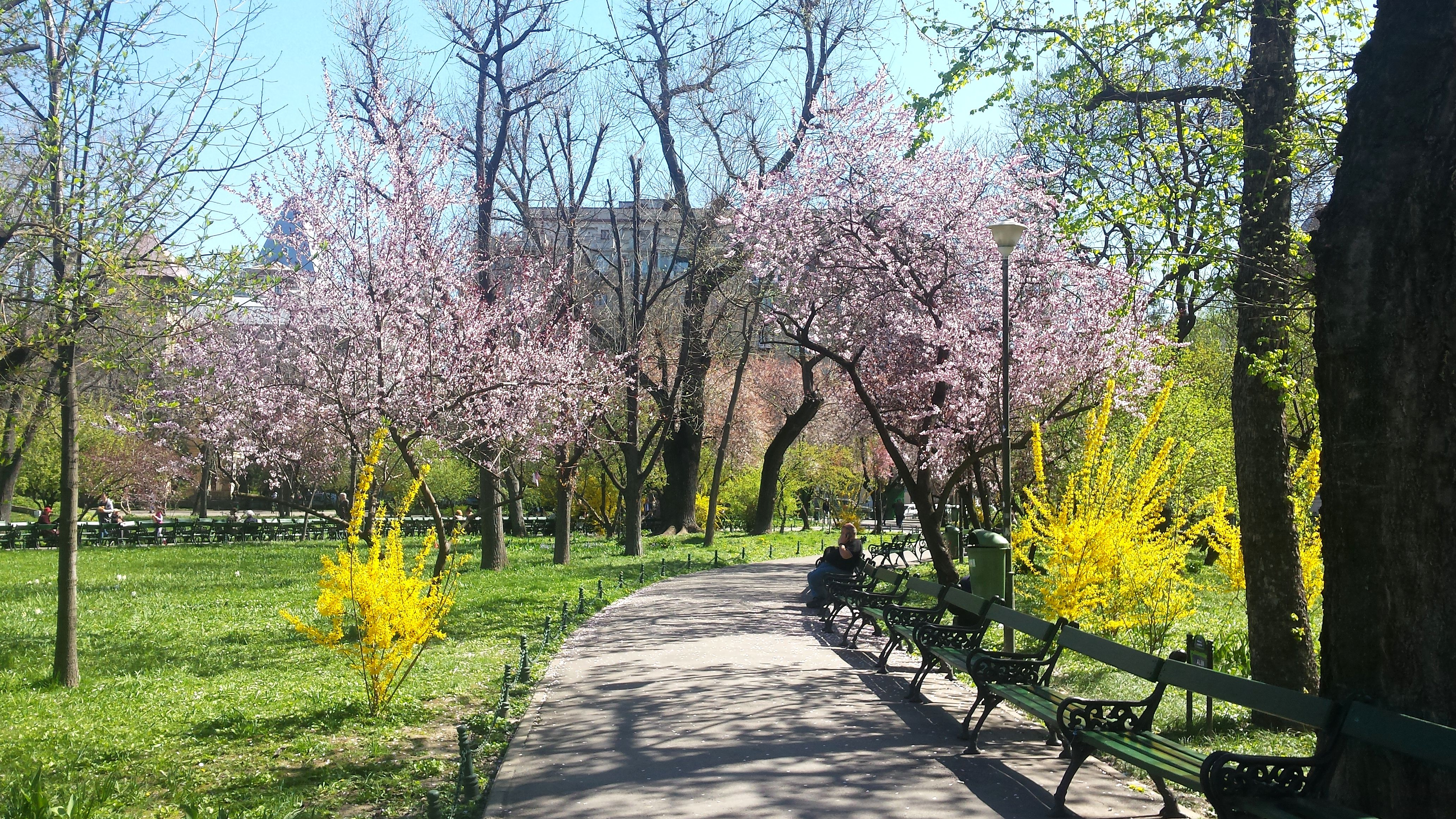
Cișmigiu Gardens

Bucharest parks and gardens also include Herăstrău Park, Tineretului Park and the Botanical Garden. Herăstrău Park is located in the northern part of the city, around Lake Herăstrău, and includes the site of the Village Museum. Grigore Antipa Museum is also near in the Victoriei Square. One of its best known locations are Hard Rock Cafe Bucharest and Berăria H (one of the largest beer halls in Europe). Tineretului Park was created in 1965 and designed as the main recreational space for southern Bucharest. It contains a Mini Town which is a play area for kids. The Botanical Garden, located in the Cotroceni neighbourhood a bit west of the city centre, is the largest of its kind in Romania and contains over 10,000 species of plants (many of them exotic); it originated as the pleasure park of the royal family. Besides them, there are many other smaller parks that should be visited, some of them being still large. Alexandru Ioan Cuza Park, Kiseleff Park, Carol Park, Izvor Park, Grădina Icoanei, Circului Park and Moghioroș Park are a few of them. Other large parks in Bucharest are: National Park, Tei Park, Eroilor Park and Crângași Park with Morii Lake.

Lake Văcărești is located in the southern part of the city. Over 190 hectares, including 90 hectares of water, host 97 species of birds, half of them protected by law, and at least seven species of mammals. The lake is surrounded by buildings of flats and is an odd result of human intervention and nature taking its course. The area was a small village that Ceaușescu attempted to convert into a lake. After demolishing the houses and building the concrete basin, the plan was abandoned following the 1989 revolution. For nearly two decades, the area shifted from being an abandoned green space where children could play and sunbathe, to being contested by previous owners of the land there, to being closed for redevelopment into a sports centre. The redevelopment deal failed, and over the following years, the green space grew into a unique habitat. In May 2016, the lake was declared a national park, the Văcărești Nature Park. Dubbed the 'Delta of Bucharest', the area is protected.

Bucharest is situated in the centre of the Romanian Plain, in an area once covered by the Vlăsiei Forest, which after it was cleared, gave way for a fertile flatland. As with many cities, Bucharest is traditionally considered to be built upon seven hills, similar to the seven hills of Rome. Bucharest's seven hills are: Mihai Vodă, Dealul Mitropoliei, Radu Vodă, Cotroceni, Dealul Spirii, Văcărești, and Sfântu Gheorghe Nou.

The city has an area of 226 km^{2} (87 sq mi). The altitude varies from 55.8 m (183.1 ft) at the Dâmbovița bridge in Cățelu, southeastern Bucharest and 91.5 m (300.2 ft) at the Militari church. The city has a roughly round shape, with the centre situated in the cross-way of the main north–south/east-west axes at University Square. The milestone for Romania's Kilometre Zero is placed just south of University Square in front of the New St. George Church (Sfântul Gheorghe Nou) at St. George Square (Piața Sfântul Gheorghe). Bucharest's radius, from University Square to the city limits in all directions, varies from 10 to 12 km (6 to 7 mi).

Until recently, the regions surrounding Bucharest were largely rural, but after 1989, suburbs started to be built around Bucharest, in the surrounding Ilfov County. This county, which has experienced rapid demographic growth in the 21st century, being the fastest growing Romanian county between 2011 and 2021, had a population of 542,686 people at the 2021 Romanian census. In the 21st century, many of Ilfov county's villages and communes developed into high-income commuter towns, which act like suburbs or satellites of Bucharest.

=== Climate ===
Bucharest has a humid continental climate (Dfa), with hot, humid summers and cold, snowy winters. Owing to its position on the Romanian Plain, the city's winters can get windy, though some of the winds are mitigated due to urbanization. Winter temperatures often dip below 0 °C (32 °F), sometimes even to −10 °C (14 °F). While the city's climate is characterised by these typical patterns, more immediate seven-day weather forecasts are routinely issued by regional meteorological services. In summer, the average high temperature is 29.8 °C (85.6 °F) (the average for July and August). Temperatures frequently reach 35 to 40 °C (95 to 104 °F) in midsummer in the city centre. Although average precipitation in summer is moderate, occasional heavy storms occur. During spring and autumn, daytime temperatures vary between 17 and 22 °C (63 and 72 °F), and precipitation during spring tends to be higher than in summer, with more frequent yet milder periods of rain.

Climate data for Bucharest Băneasa (1991–2020 normals, extremes 1929–present)
Month	Jan	Feb	Mar	Apr	May	Jun	Jul	Aug	Sep	Oct	Nov	Dec	Year
Record high °C (°F)	23.6 (74.5)	26.5 (79.7)	32.8 (91.0)	34.9 (94.8)	36.9 (98.4)	40.3 (104.5)	47.8 (118.0)	41.5 (106.7)	39.6 (103.3)	36.4 (97.5)	29.4 (84.9)	20.8 (69.4)	47.8 (118.0)
Mean maximum °C (°F)	11.2 (52.2)	14.3 (57.7)	21.0 (69.8)	26.2 (79.2)	30.5 (86.9)	34.3 (93.7)	36.4 (97.5)	36.6 (97.9)	31.8 (89.2)	25.4 (77.7)	18.2 (64.8)	12.3 (54.1)	37.4 (99.3)
Mean daily maximum °C (°F)	3.0 (37.4)	6.3 (43.3)	12.3 (54.1)	18.5 (65.3)	24.1 (75.4)	28.1 (82.6)	30.4 (86.7)	30.6 (87.1)	25.0 (77.0)	18.0 (64.4)	10.5 (50.9)	4.2 (39.6)	17.6 (63.7)
Daily mean °C (°F)	−1.5 (29.3)	0.6 (33.1)	5.6 (42.1)	11.4 (52.5)	16.8 (62.2)	21.1 (70.0)	23.0 (73.4)	22.4 (72.3)	16.8 (62.2)	10.7 (51.3)	5.3 (41.5)	0.0 (32.0)	11.0 (51.8)
Mean daily minimum °C (°F)	−5.0 (23.0)	−3.5 (25.7)	0.3 (32.5)	4.9 (40.8)	9.7 (49.5)	13.9 (57.0)	15.6 (60.1)	15.2 (59.4)	10.7 (51.3)	5.7 (42.3)	1.4 (34.5)	−3.3 (26.1)	5.5 (41.9)
Mean minimum °C (°F)	−15.4 (4.3)	−12.8 (9.0)	−6.4 (20.5)	−0.5 (31.1)	4.6 (40.3)	9.8 (49.6)	12.1 (53.8)	11.5 (52.7)	5.4 (41.7)	−1.2 (29.8)	−6.8 (19.8)	−11.9 (10.6)	−18.2 (−0.8)
Record low °C (°F)	−32.2 (−26.0)	−29.0 (−20.2)	−21.7 (−7.1)	−9.5 (14.9)	−5.0 (23.0)	4.5 (40.1)	7.4 (45.3)	5.2 (41.4)	−3.1 (26.4)	−8.0 (17.6)	−19.4 (−2.9)	−25.6 (−14.1)	−32.2 (−26.0)
Average precipitation mm (inches)	40.1 (1.58)	33.0 (1.30)	42.4 (1.67)	50.2 (1.98)	70.4 (2.77)	82.7 (3.26)	68.6 (2.70)	48.9 (1.93)	60.5 (2.38)	60.7 (2.39)	43.6 (1.72)	47.0 (1.85)	648.1 (25.52)
Average snowfall cm (inches)	13.7 (5.4)	11.0 (4.3)	10.5 (4.1)	1.5 (0.6)	0.0 (0.0)	0.0 (0.0)	0.0 (0.0)	0.0 (0.0)	0.0 (0.0)	0.0 (0.0)	8.8 (3.5)	10.5 (4.1)	56.0 (22.0)
Average precipitation days (≥ 1.0 mm)	6.1	5.4	6.3	6.2	8.4	8.3	7.1	5.2	4.9	5.6	5.4	6.7	75.6
Average relative humidity (%)	86	82	71	63	62	61	58	57	61	73	84	87	70
Average dew point °C (°F)	−4.2 (24.4)	−2.7 (27.1)	0.9 (33.6)	5.4 (41.7)	10.2 (50.4)	13.9 (57.0)	15.3 (59.5)	14.7 (58.5)	11.6 (52.9)	6.8 (44.2)	2.5 (36.5)	−1.3 (29.7)	6.1 (43.0)
Mean monthly sunshine hours	78.8	107.1	156.7	195.3	245.4	259.4	293.4	283.0	208.7	149.6	84.8	63.9	2,126.1
Percentage possible sunshine	27	36	42	48	53	56	63	66	56	44	29	23	48
Average ultraviolet index	1	2	3	5	7	8	8	7	5	3	2	1	4
Source 1: NOAA (dew point and snowfall 1961–1990)
Source 2: Administrația Națională de Meteorologie (extremes), Danish Meteorological Institute (humidity, 1931–1960) and Weather Atlas

== Government ==
Bucharest highlighted red on a map of counties of Romania.

=== Administration ===
Bucharest has a unique status in Romanian administration, since it is the only municipal area that is not part of a county. Its population, however, is larger than that of any other Romanian county, hence the power of the Bucharest General Municipality (Primăria Generală), which is the capital's local government body, is the same as any other Romanian county council.

The Municipality of Bucharest, along with the surrounding Ilfov County, is part of the București – Ilfov development region project, which is equivalent to NUTS-II regions in the European Union and is used both by the EU and the Romanian government for statistical analysis, and to co-ordinate regional development projects and manage funds from the EU. The Bucharest-Ilfov development region is not, however, an administrative entity yet.

Sectors of Bucharest

The city government is headed by a general mayor (Primar General). Since 19 December 2025, this is Ciprian Ciucu of the PNL. Decisions are approved and discussed by the capital's General Council (Consiliu General) made up of 55 elected councilors. Furthermore, the city is divided into six administrative sectors (sectoare), each of which has its own 27-seat sectoral council, town hall, and mayor. The powers of the local government over a certain area are, therefore, shared both by the Bucharest municipality and the local sectoral councils with little or no overlapping of authority. The general rule is that the main capital municipality is responsible for citywide utilities such as the water and sewage system, the overall transport system, and the main boulevards, while sectoral town halls manage the contact between individuals and the local government, secondary streets and parks maintenance, schools administration, and cleaning services.

The six sectors are numbered from one to six and are disposed radially so that each one has under its administration a certain area of the city centre. They are numbered clockwise and are further divided into sectoral quarters (cartiere) which are not part of the official administrative division:

- Sector 1 (population 227,717): Dorobanți, Băneasa, Aviației, Pipera, Aviatorilor, Primăverii, Romană, Victoriei, Herăstrău Park, Bucureștii Noi, Dămăroaia, Străulești, Grivița, 1 Mai, Băneasa Forest, Pajura, Domenii, Chibrit
- Sector 2 (population 357,338): Pantelimon, Colentina, Iancului, Tei, Floreasca, Moșilor, Obor, Vatra Luminoasă, Fundeni, Plumbuita, Ștefan cel Mare, Baicului
- Sector 3 (population 399,231): Vitan, Dudești, Titan, Centrul Civic, Dristor, Lipscani, Muncii, Unirii
- Sector 4 (population 300,331): Berceni, Olteniței, Giurgiului, Progresul, Văcărești, Timpuri Noi, Tineretului
- Sector 5 (population 288,690): Rahova, Ferentari, Giurgiului, Cotroceni, 13 Septembrie, Dealul Spirii
- Sector 6 (population 371,060): Giulești, Crângași, Drumul Taberei, Militari, Grozăvești (also known as Regie), Ghencea

The City Hall of Bucharest in 2020

Each sector is governed by a local mayor, as follows: Sector 1 – George Tuță (PNL, since 2024), Sector 2 – Rareș Hopincă (PSD, since 2024), Sector 3 – Robert Negoiță (PRO B, since 2012), Sector 4 – Daniel Băluță (PSD, since 2016), Sector 5 – Vlad Popescu Piedone (former mayor Cristian Popescu Piedone's son) (PUSL, since 2024), Sector 6 – Paul Moldovan (PNL, acting since 2025).

Like all other local councils in Romania, the Bucharest sectoral councils, the capital's general council, and the mayors are elected every four years by the population. Additionally, Bucharest has a prefect, who is appointed by Romania's national government. The prefect is not allowed to be a member of a political party and his role is to represent the national government at the municipal level. The prefect is acting as a liaison official facilitating the implementation of national development plans and governing programs at local level. The prefect of Bucharest (as of 2024) is Mihai Mugur Toader.

==== City general council ====
The city's general council has the following political composition, based on the results of the 2024 local elections:

Party	Seats	Current Council
USR + PMP + FD (ADU)	17	
Social Democratic Party (PSD)	16	
National Liberal Party (PNL)	7	
Social Liberal Humanist Party (PUSL)	6	
Alliance for the Union of Romania (AUR)	5	
Renewing Romania's European Project (REPER)	4	

=== Justice system ===
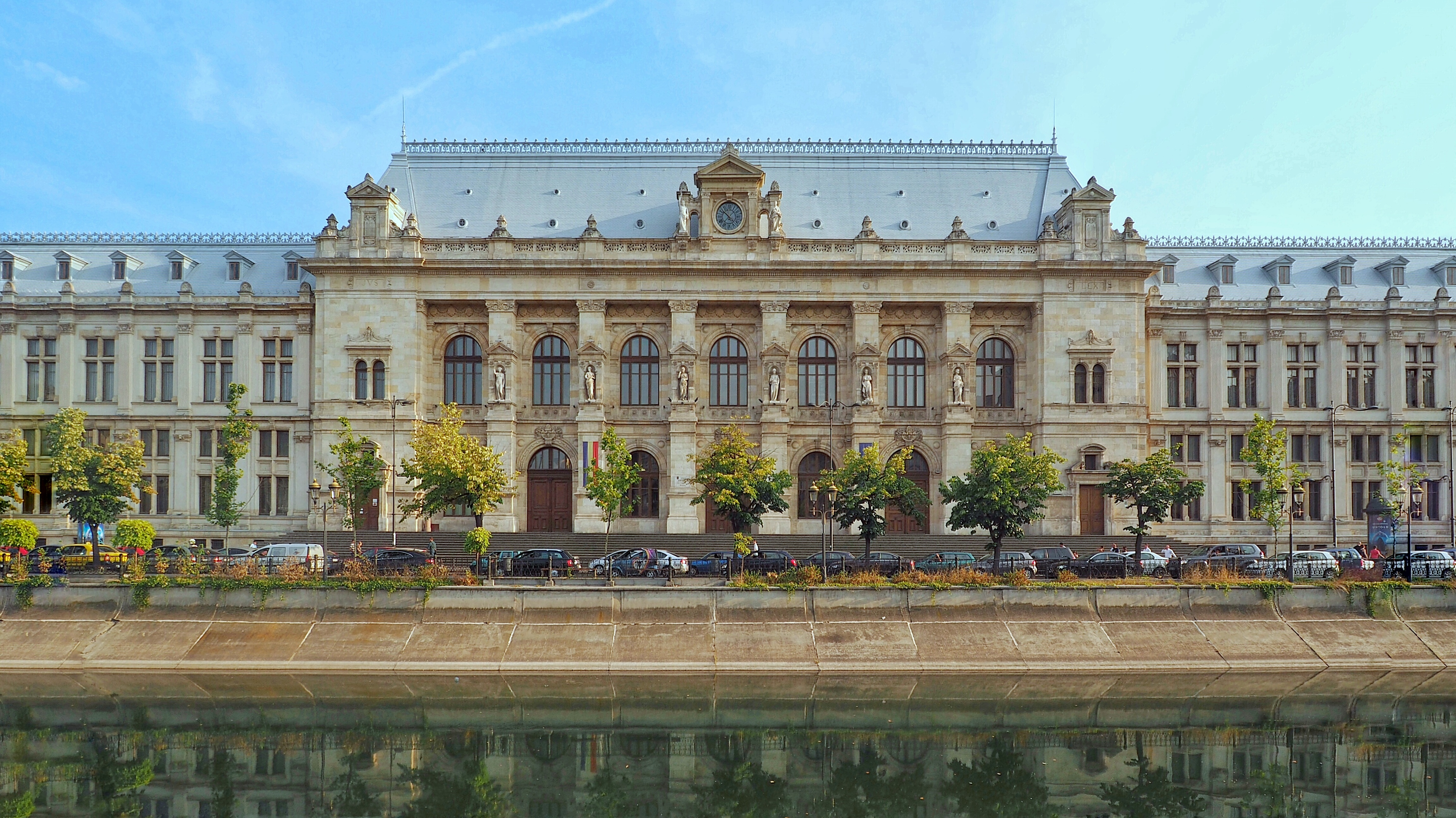
Palace of Justice seen across the Dâmbovița River in 2016

Bucharest's judicial system is similar to that of the Romanian counties. Each of the six sectors has its own local first-instance court (judecătorie), while more serious cases are directed to the Bucharest Tribunal (Tribunalul Bucureşti), the city's municipal court. The Bucharest Court of Appeal (Curtea de Apel Bucureşti) judges appeals against decisions taken by first-instance courts and tribunals in Bucharest and in five surrounding counties (Teleorman, Ialomița, Giurgiu, Călărași, and Ilfov). Bucharest is also home to Romania's supreme court, the High Court of Cassation and Justice, as well as to the Constitutional Court of Romania.

Bucharest has a municipal police force, the Bucharest Police (Poliția București), which is responsible for policing crime within the whole city, and operates a number of divisions. The Bucharest Police are headquartered on Ștefan cel Mare Blvd. in the city centre, and at precincts throughout the city. From 2004 onwards, each sector city hall also has under its administration a community police force (Poliția Comunitară), dealing with local community issues. Bucharest also houses the general inspectorates of the Gendarmerie and the national police.

=== Crime ===
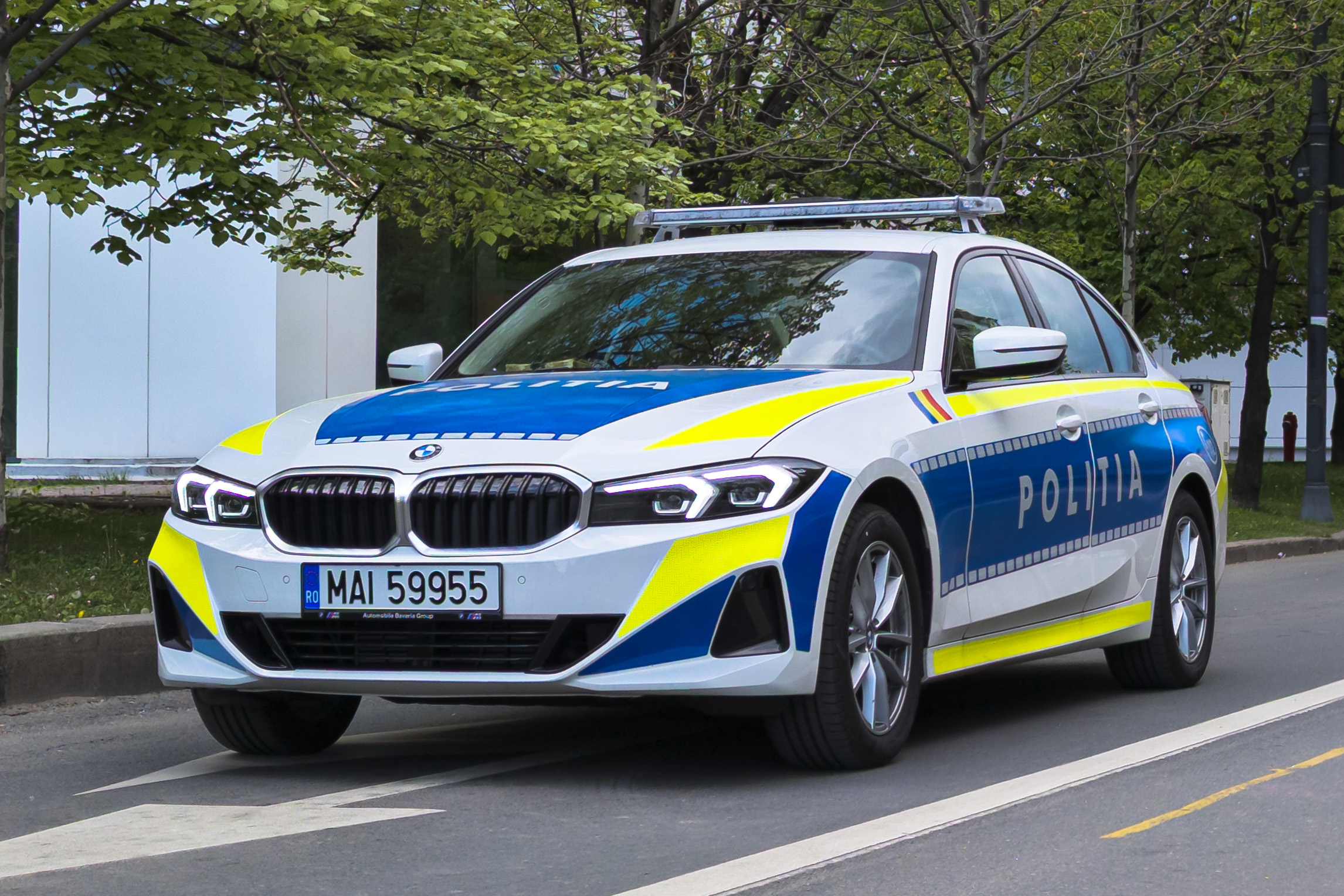
A National Romanian Police car

Bucharest's crime rate is rather low in comparison to other European capital cities, with the number of total offences declining by 51% between 2000 and 2004, and by 7% between 2012 and 2013. Bucharest, along with Cluj-Napoca, Timișoara, Brașov and Iași, was ranked among the top 100 safest cities in the world in a list compiled by Numbeo. The study found Bucharest to be very safe with regard to aspects such walking alone, home invasions, muggings, cars being stolen, assault, insults, assault due to skin colour, ethnic origin, or gender, drug dealing, and armed robberies, with the only crimes in the high category being corruption and bribery. In 2015, the homicide rate of Bucharest was 0,8 per 100,000 people.

Crime in Bucharest is combated by national forces, such as the Romanian Police and Romanian Gendarmerie, and by local forces, such as the Local Police of Bucharest.

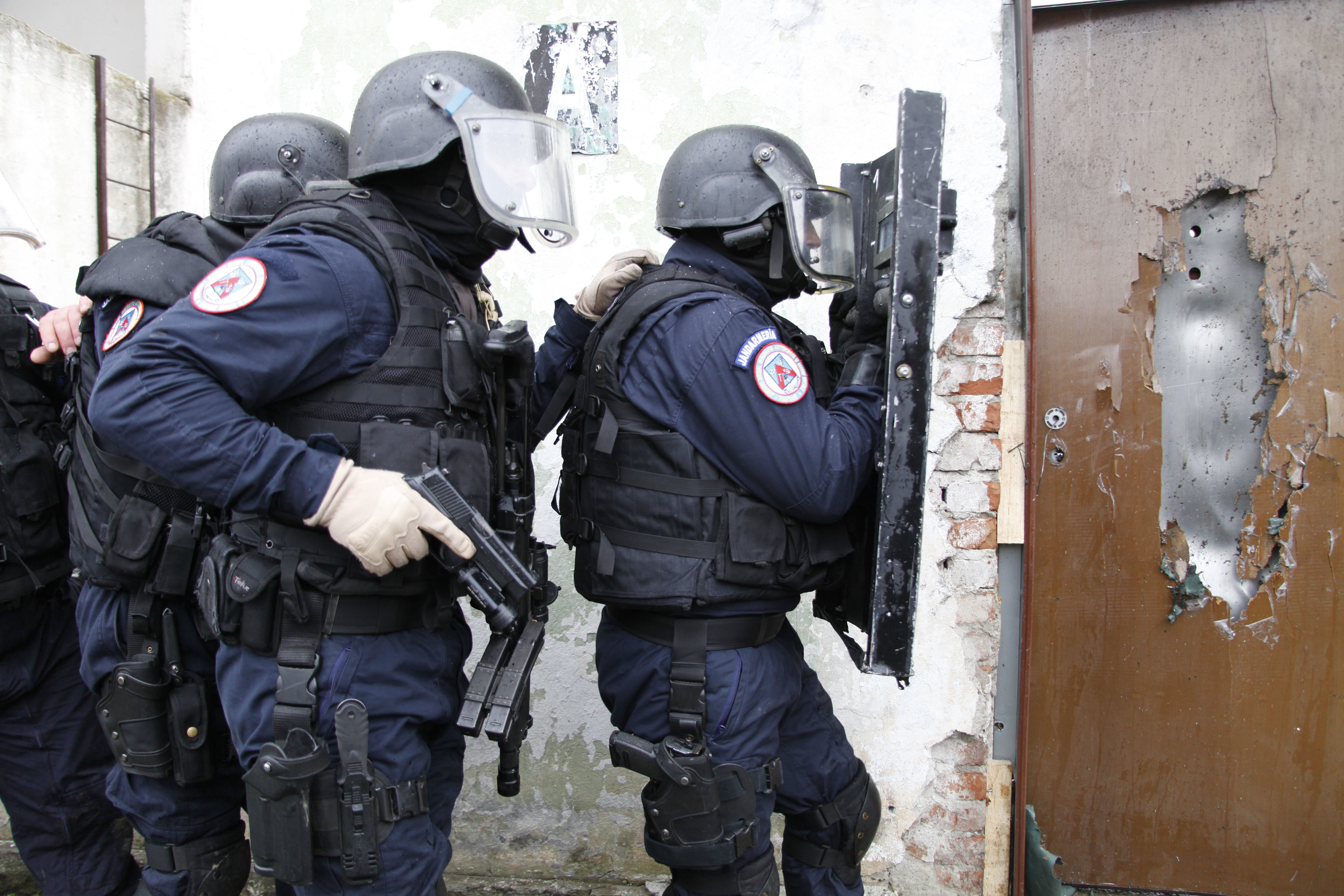
Romanian Gendarmerie, which is tasked with high-risk and specialised law enforcement duties, demonstrates room-clearing during a training exercise in Bucharest

Although in the 2000s, a number of police crackdowns on organised crime gangs occurred, such as the Cămătaru clan, organised crime generally has little impact on public life. Petty crime, however, is more common, particularly in the form of pickpocketing, which occurs mainly on the city's public transport network. Confidence tricks were common in the 1990s, especially in regards to tourists, but the frequency of these incidents has since declined. Theft was reduced by 13.6% in 2013 compared to 2012. Levels of crime are higher in the southern districts of the city, particularly in Ferentari, a socially disadvantaged area.

Although the presence of street children was a problem in Bucharest in the 1990s, their numbers have declined in recent years, now lying at or below the average of major European capital cities.

=== Quality of life ===
As stated by the Mercer international surveys for quality of life in cities around the world, Bucharest occupied the 94th place in 2001 and slipped lower, to the 108th place in 2009 and the 107th place in 2010. Compared to it, Vienna occupied number one worldwide in 2011 and 2009. Warsaw ranked 84th, Istanbul 112th, and neighbours Sofia 114th and Belgrade 136th (in the 2010 rankings).

Mercer Human Resource Consulting issues yearly a global ranking of the world's most livable cities based on 39 key quality-of-life issues. Among them: political stability, currency-exchange regulations, political and media censorship, school quality, housing, the environment, and public safety. Mercer collects data worldwide, in 215 cities. The difficult situation of the quality of life in Bucharest is confirmed also by a vast urbanism study, done by the Ion Mincu University of Architecture and Urbanism.

In 2016, Bucharest's urban situation was described as 'critical' by a Romanian Order of Architects (OAR) report that criticised the city's weak, incoherent and arbitrary public management policies, its elected officials' lack of transparency and public engagement, as well as its inadequate and unsustainable use of essential urban resources. Bucharest's historical city centre is listed as 'endangered' by the World Monuments Watch (as of 2016).

Although many neighbourhoods, particularly in the southern part of the city, lack sufficient green space, being formed of cramped, high-density blocks of flats, Bucharest also has many parks.

In 2024, Bucharest was ranked by the digital publication Freaking Nomads as the 9th best city in the world for digital nomads, due to its elaborate and diverse architecture, an arts scene featuring some of the world's best galleries, museums, and theatres, and its tranquil parks.

== Demographics ==
Bucharest population pyramid in 2021

Historical population
Year	Pop.	±%
1595	10,000	—
1650	20,000	+100.0%
1789	30,030	+50.2%
1831	60,587	+101.8%
1851	60,000	−1.0%
1859	121,734	+102.9%
1877	177,646	+45.9%
1900	282,071	+58.8%
1912	341,321	+21.0%
1930	639,040	+87.2%
1941	992,536	+55.3%
1948	1,041,807	+5.0%
1956	1,177,661	+13.0%
1966	1,366,684	+16.1%
1972	1,511,239	+10.6%
1977	1,807,239	+19.6%
1982	1,898,323	+5.0%
1987	1,985,393	+4.6%
1992	2,064,474	+4.0%
2002	1,926,334	−6.7%
2011	1,883,425	−2.2%
2021	1,716,961	−8.8%
1851 data: Chambers's Encyclopaedia, 1900: Encyclopædia Britannica, 1941, 1948, other data: Population size may be affected by changes in administrative divisions.

As per the 2021 census, 1,716,961 inhabitants lived within the city limits, a decrease from the figure recorded at the 2011 census. This decrease is due to low natural increase, but also to a shift in population from the city itself to its smaller satellite towns such as Popești-Leordeni, Voluntari, Chiajna, Bragadiru, Pantelimon, Buftea and Otopeni. In a study published by the United Nations, Bucharest placed 19th among 28 cities that recorded sharp declines in population from 1990 to the mid-2010s. In particular, the population fell by 3.77%.

The city's population, according to the 2002 census, was 1,926,334 inhabitants, or 8.9% of the total population of Romania. A significant number of people commute to the city every day, mostly from the surrounding Ilfov County, but official statistics regarding their numbers do not exist.

Bucharest's population experienced two phases of rapid growth. The first began in the late 19th century when the city was consolidated as the national capital and lasted until the Second World War; the second spanned the Ceaușescu years (1965–1989), when a massive urbanization campaign was launched and many people migrated from rural areas to the capital. At this time, due to Ceaușescu's decision to ban abortion and contraception, natural increase was also significant.

Bucharest is a city of high population density: 8,260/km^{2} (21,400/sq mi), as most of the populace lives in high-density communist era apartment blocks (blocuri). However, this also depends on the part of the city: the southern boroughs have a higher density than the northern ones. Of the capital cities of countries in the European Union, only Paris and Athens have a higher population density (see List of European Union cities proper by population density). In addition to blocks of flats built during the communist era, there are also older ones that survived the Second World War, as well as newer ones built in the 1990s and in the 21st century. Although apartment buildings are strongly associated with the communist era, such housing schemes were first constructed in Bucharest in the 1920s.

About 97.3% of the populace of Bucharest for whom data are available are Romanians. Other significant ethnic groups are Romani, Hungarians, Turks, Jews, Germans (mostly Regat Germans), Chinese, Russians, Ukrainians, and Italians. A relatively small number of Bucharesters are also Greeks, Armenians, Kurds, Bulgarians, Albanians, Poles, French, Arabs, Africans (including the Afro-Romanians), Iranians, Vietnamese, Filipinos, Nepalis, Afghans, Sri Lankans, Bangladeshis, Pakistanis, and Indians. 226,943 people did not declare their ethnicity.

In terms of religious affiliation, during the 2021 Census, 27.5% of the resident populace did not provide their religion. Of the remaining 72.5% for whom data are available, 92.4% is Romanian Orthodox, 1.4% is Roman Catholic, 1.3% is Protestant Christian, 0.6% is Muslim, and 0.2% is Romanian Greek Catholic. Despite this, only 18% of the population, of any religion, attends a place of worship once a week or more. The life expectancy of residents of Bucharest in 2015 was 77.8 years old, which is 2.4 years above the national average.

== Economy ==
Bucharest is the centre of the Romanian economy and industry, accounting for around 24% (2017) of the country's GDP and about one-quarter of its industrial production, while being inhabited by 9% of the country's population. Almost one-third of national taxes is paid by Bucharest's citizens and companies. The living standard in the Bucharest–Ilfov region was 145% of the EU average in 2017, according to GDP per capita at the purchasing power parity standard (adjusted to the national price level).

The Bucharest area surpassed, on comparable terms, European metropolitan areas such as Budapest (139%), Madrid (125%), Berlin (118%), Rome (110%), Lisbon (102%), and Sofia (79%), and more than twice the Romanian average. After relative stagnation in the 1990s, the city's strong economic growth has revitalised infrastructure and led to the development of shopping malls, residential estates, and high-rise office buildings. In January 2013, Bucharest had an unemployment rate of 2.1%, significantly lower than the national unemployment rate of 5.8%.

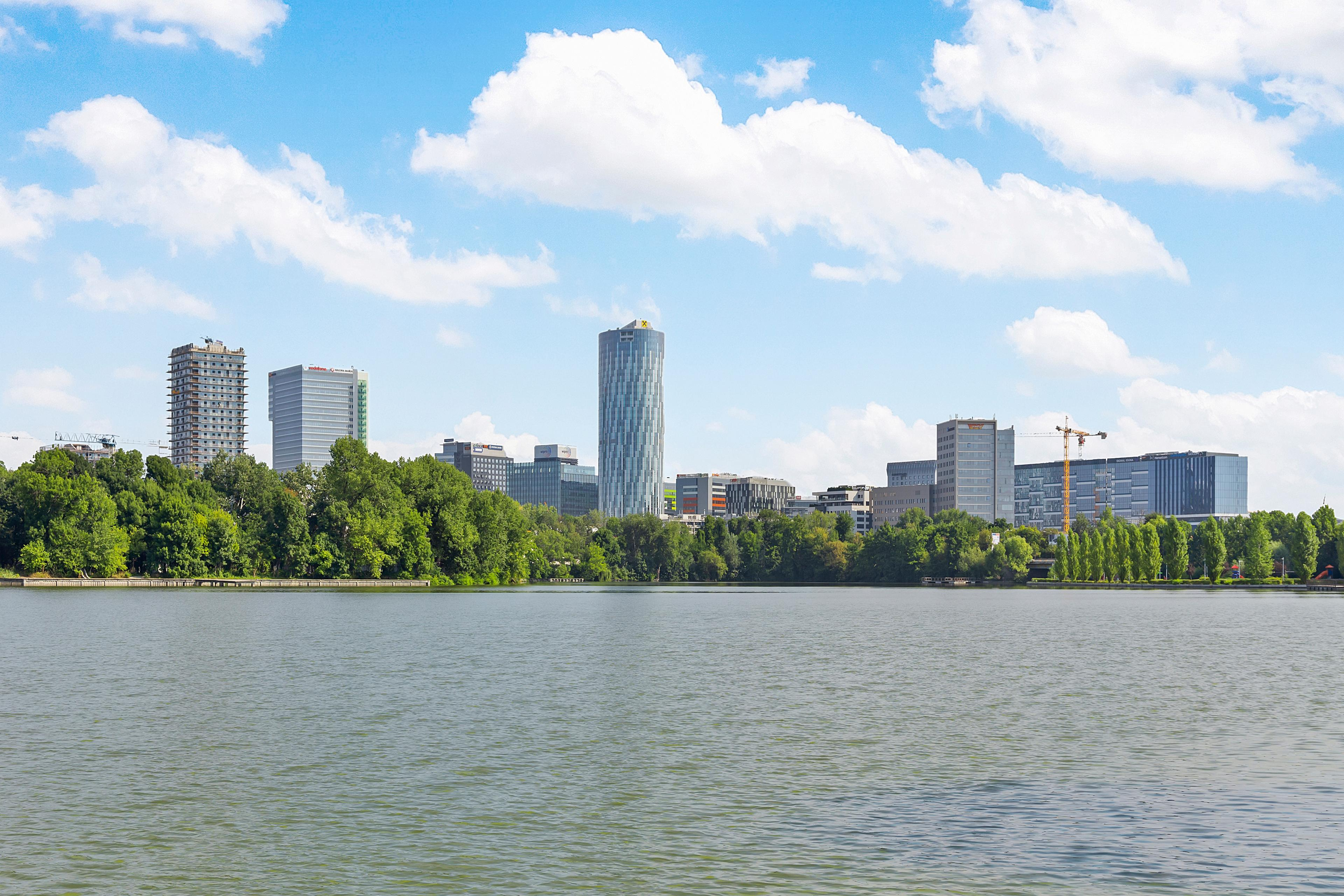
Floreasca City Center business district, as seen from Lake Herăstrău.

Bucharest's economy is centred on industry and services, with services particularly growing in importance in the past 10 years. The headquarters of 186,000 firms, including nearly all large Romanian companies, are located in Bucharest. An important source of growth since 2000 has been the city's rapidly expanding property and construction sector. Bucharest is also Romania's largest centre for information technology and communications and is home to several software companies operating offshore delivery centres. Romania's largest stock exchange, the Bucharest Stock Exchange, which was merged in December 2005 with the Bucharest-based electronic stock exchange Rasdaq, plays a major role in the city's economy.

Malls and large shopping centres have been built since the late 1990s, such as Băneasa Shopping City, AFI Palace Cotroceni, Mega Mall, București Mall, ParkLake Shopping Centre, Sun Plaza, Promenada Mall and longest Unirea Shopping Centre. Bucharest has over 20 malls as of 2019.

The corporations Amazon, Microsoft, Ubisoft, Oracle Corporation, or IBM are all present in the Romanian capital. The top ten is also dominated by companies operating in automotive, oil & gas (such as Petrom), as well as companies in telecommunication and FMCG. The Speedtest Global Index ranks Bucharest the 6th city in the world (after Beijing, Shanghai, Abu Dhabi, Valparaíso, and Lyon) in terms of fixed broadband speed, at 250Mbps as of 2023.

IBM Bucharest

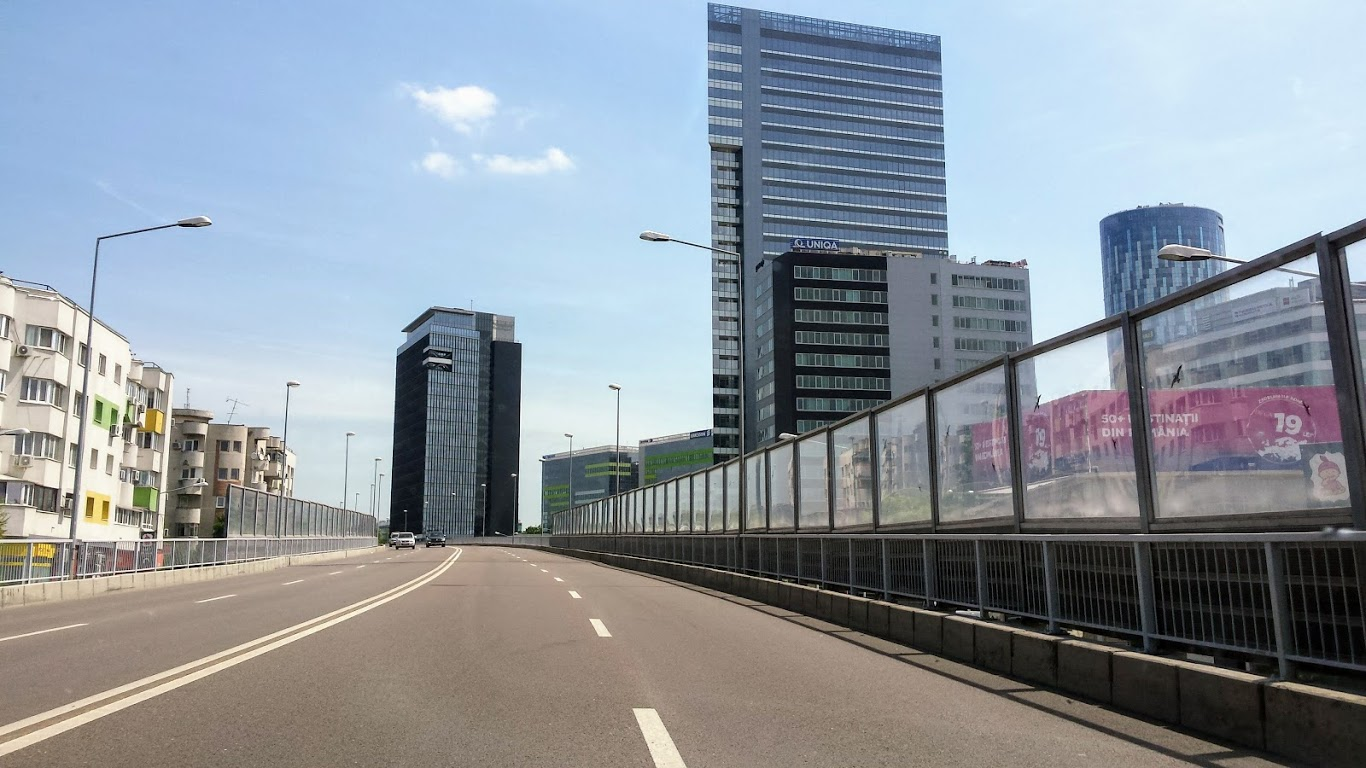
Floreasca City Center (including SkyTower and Oracle headquarters)

Amazon operates office space in the Globalworth Tower.

Petrom City

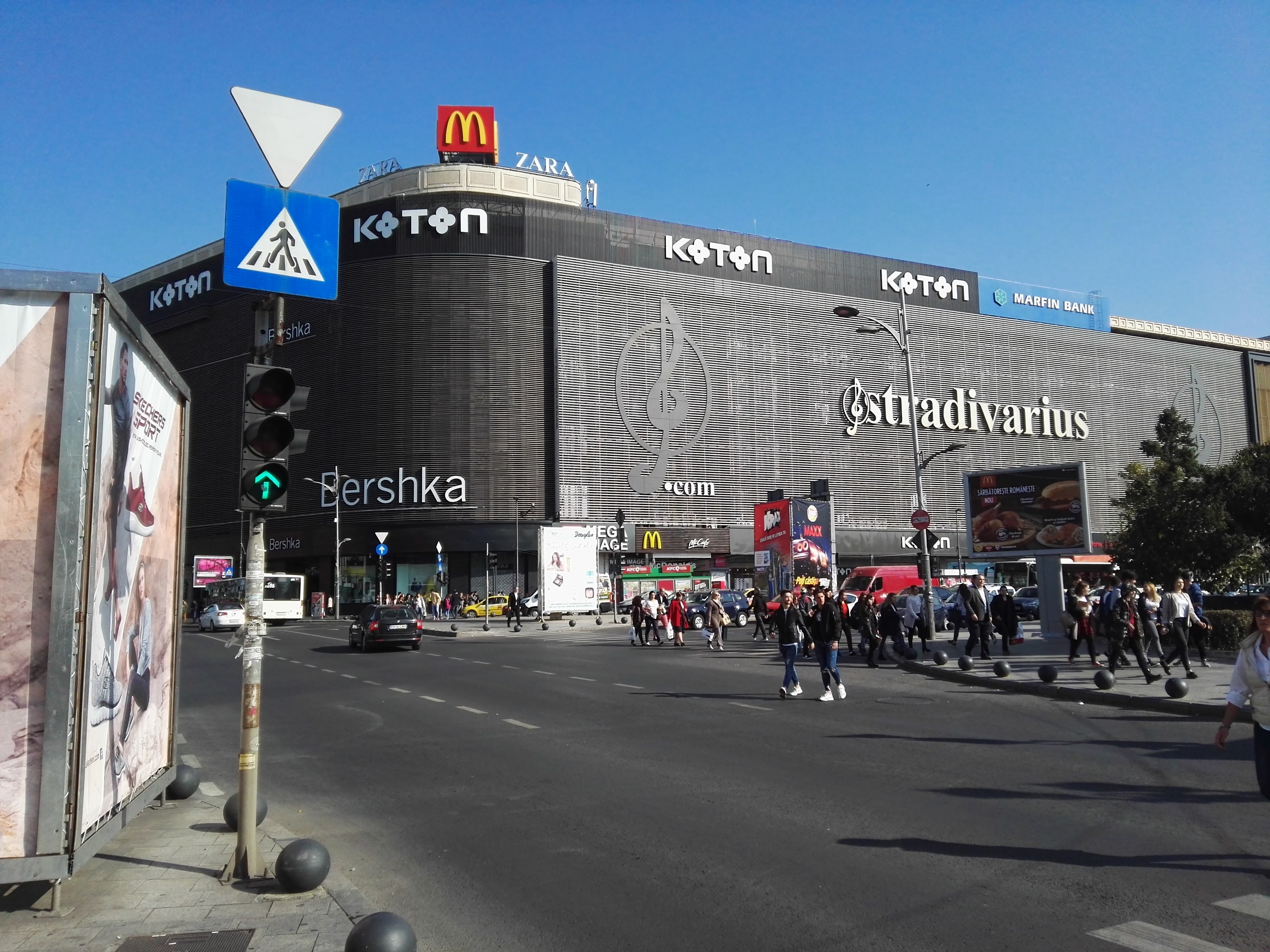
Unirea Shopping Center

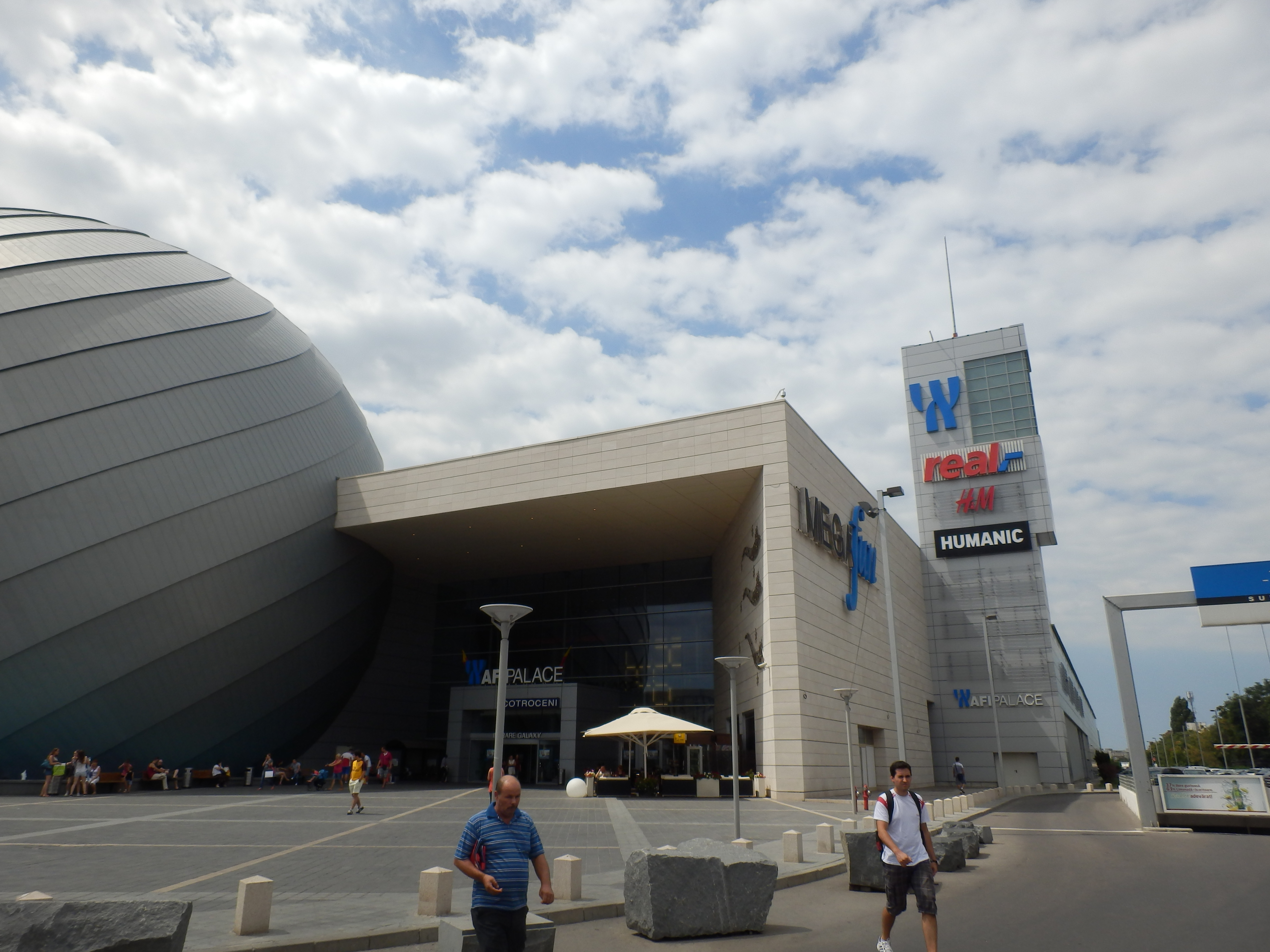
AFI Cotroceni

== Transport ==
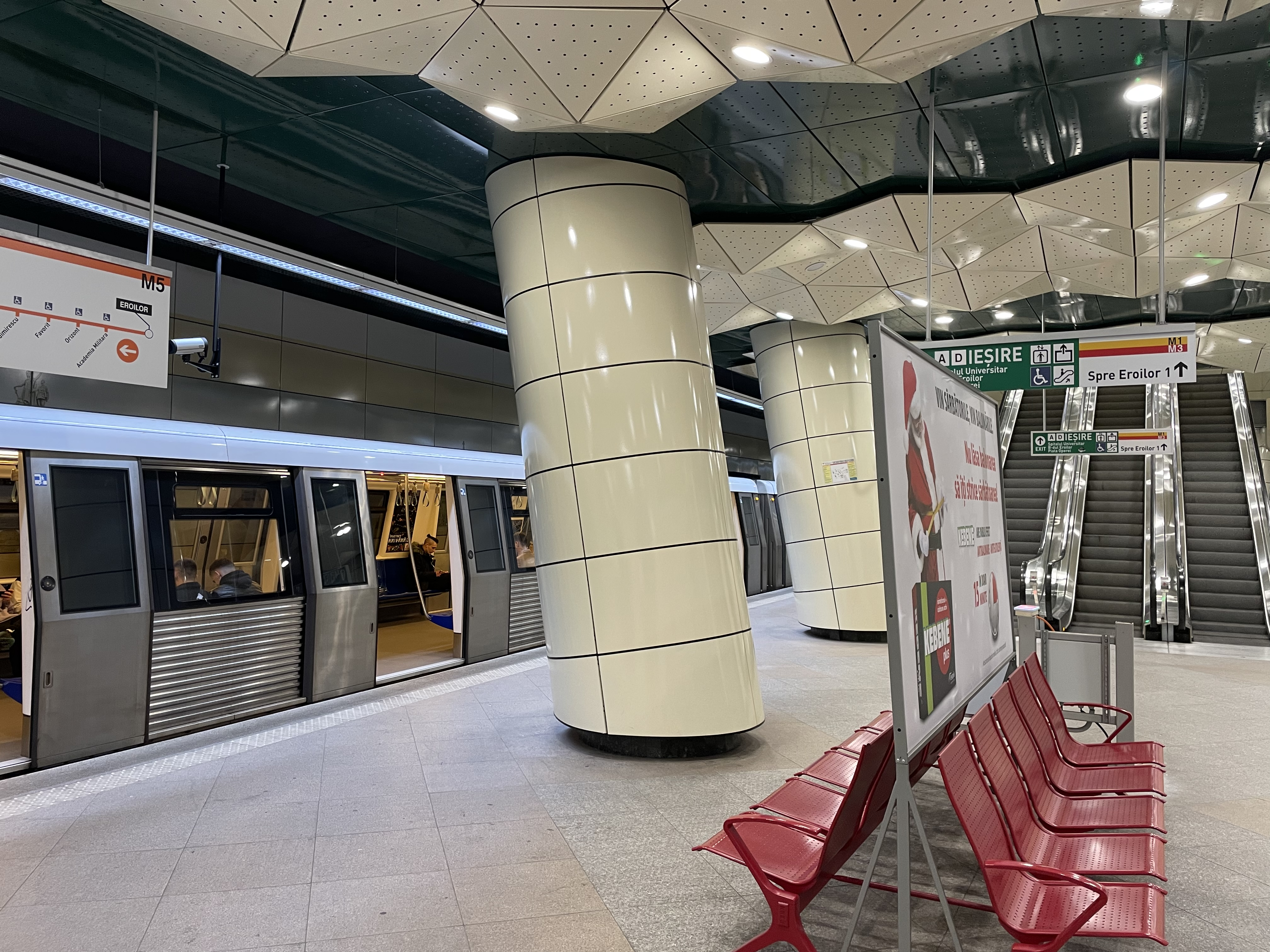
Bucharest Metro has 64 stations.

Bucharest is crossed by two major international routes: Pan-European transport corridor IV and IX.

=== Public transport ===
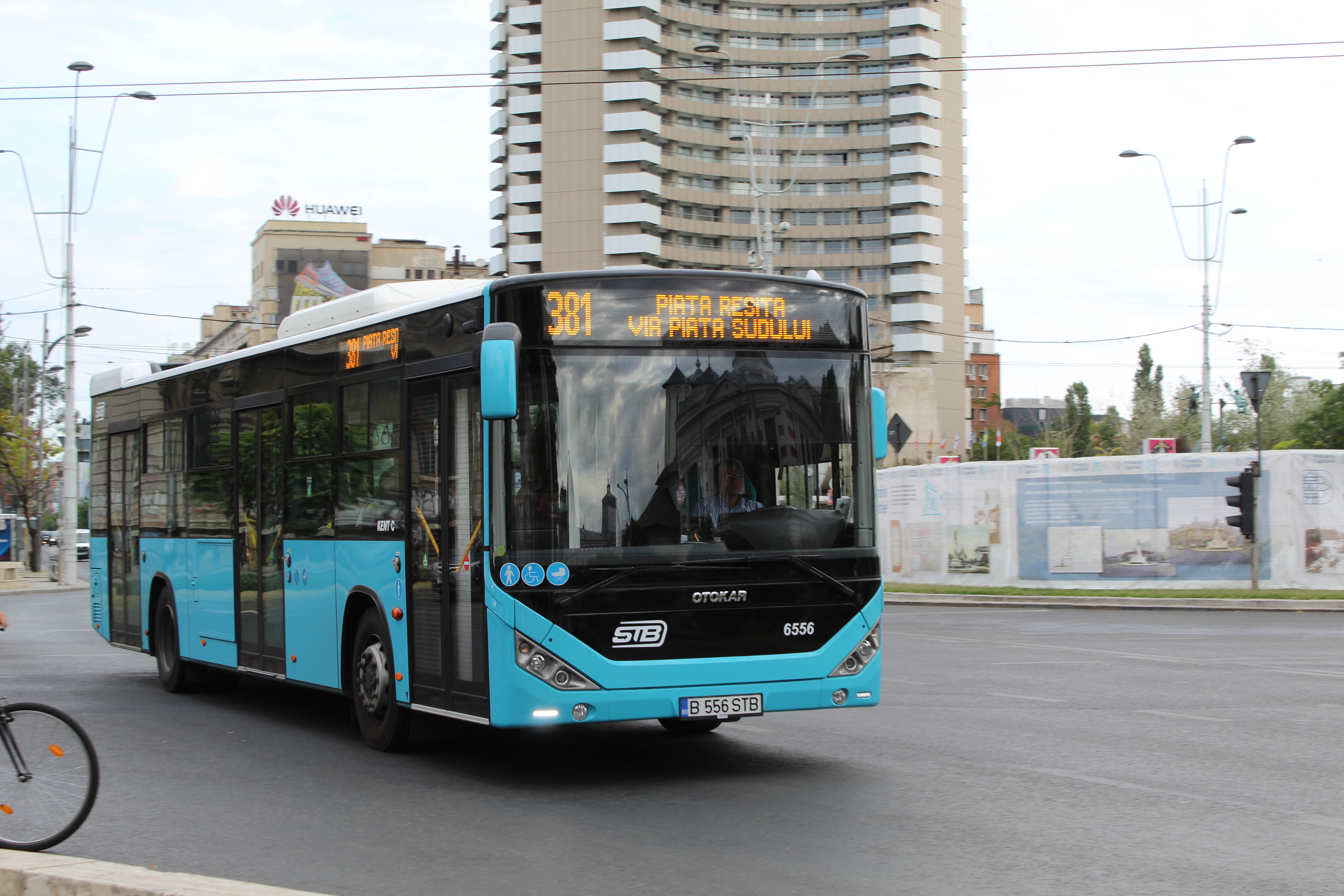
Otokar Kent bus at the Universitate junction

Bucharest Metro Network Map

Bucharest's public transport system is the largest in Romania and one of the largest in Europe. It is made up of the Bucharest Metro, run by Metrorex, as well as a surface transport system run by STB (Societatea de Transport București, previously known as the RATB), which consists of buses, trams, trolleybuses, and light rail. In addition, a private minibus system operates there. As of 2007, a limit of 10,000 taxicab licences was imposed.

The Bucharest Metro consists of five lines (M1, M2, M3, M4, and M5) ran by Metrorex, and is one of the fastest ways to get around the city. The oldest metro line is M1, which was opened in 1979. The newest metro line is M5, which was opened in 2020. A sixth metro line, M6 line, is currently under construction.

=== Railways ===
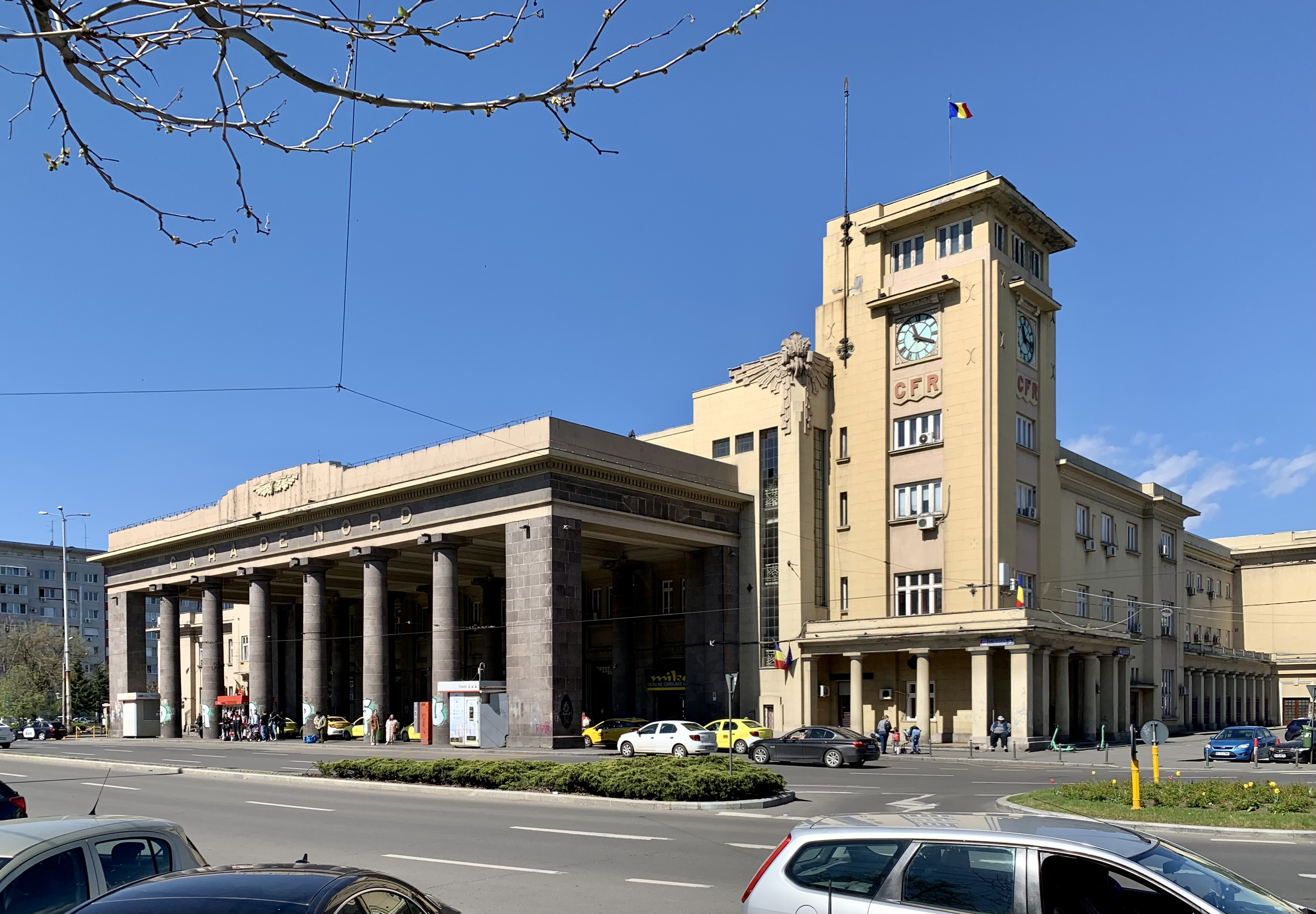
Gara de Nord (North Railway Station)

It is the hub of Romania's national railway network, run by Căile Ferate Române. The main railway station is Gara de Nord ('North Station'), which provides connections to all major cities in Romania, as well as international destinations: Belgrade, Sofia, Varna, Chișinău, Kyiv, Chernivtsi, Lviv, Thessaloniki, Vienna, Budapest, Istanbul, etc.

The city has five other railway stations run by CFR, of which the most important are Basarab (adjacent to North Station), Obor, Băneasa, and Progresul. These are in the process of being integrated into a commuter railway serving Bucharest and the surrounding Ilfov County. Seven main lines radiate out of Bucharest.

The oldest railway station in Bucharest is Filaret, inaugurated in 1869. In 1960, the communist government turned it into a bus terminal.

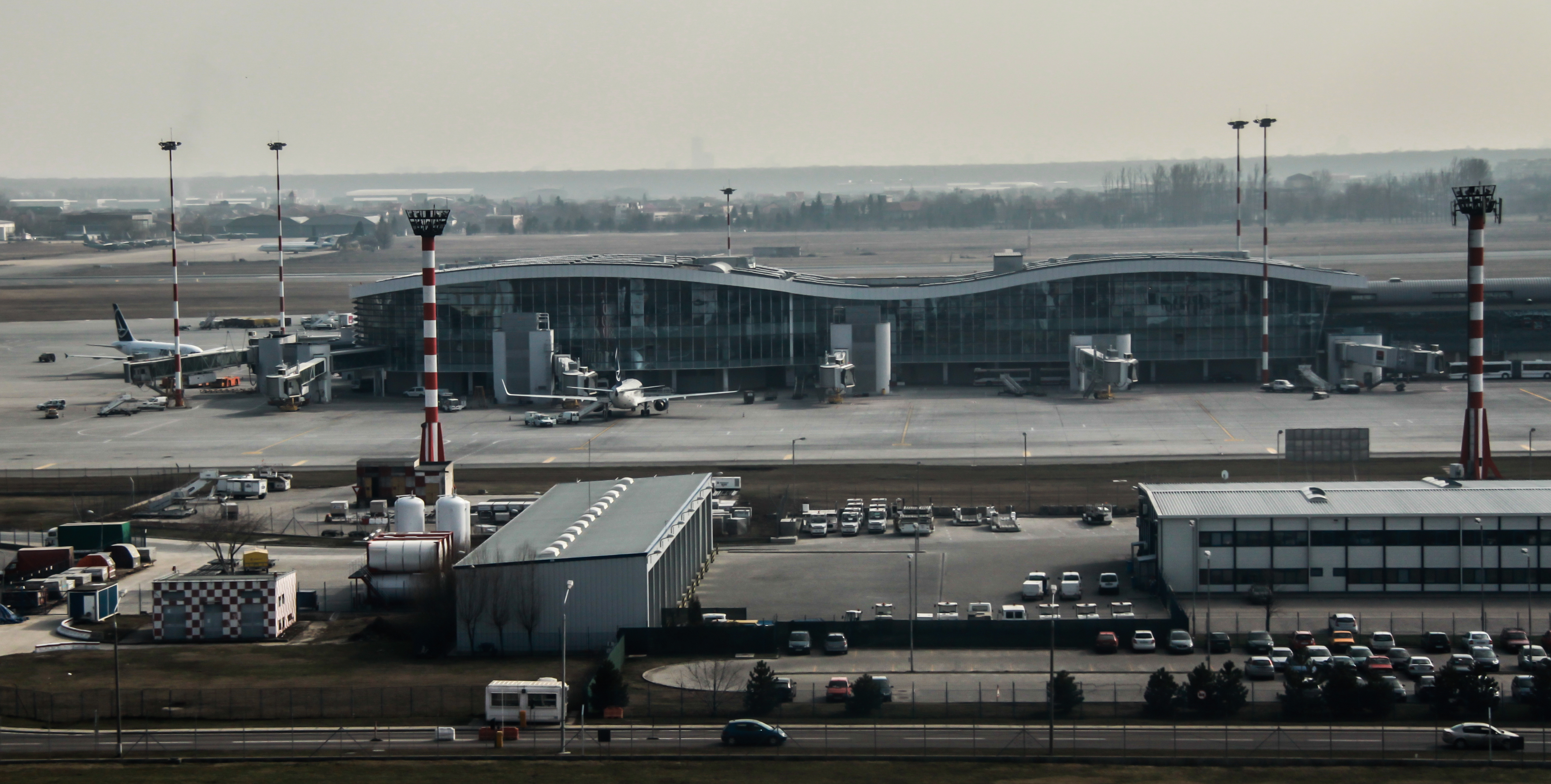
Henri Coandă International Airport

=== Air ===
- Henri Coandă International Airport (IATA: OTP, ICAO: LROP), located 16.5 km (10.3 mi) north of the Bucharest city centre, in the town of Otopeni, Ilfov. It is the busiest airport in Romania, in terms of passenger traffic: 12,807,032 in 2017.
- Aurel Vlaicu International Airport (IATA: BBU, ICAO: LRBS) is Bucharest's business and VIP airport. It is situated only 8 km (5.0 mi) north of the Bucharest city centre, within city limits.

=== Roads ===
Bucharest is a major intersection of Romania's national road network. A few of the busiest national roads and motorways link the city to all of Romania's major cities, as well as to neighbouring countries such as Hungary, Bulgaria and Ukraine. The A1 to Pitești, and from Sibiu to the Hungarian border, the A2 Sun Motorway to the Dobrogea region and Constanța, and the A3 to Ploiești all start from Bucharest.

By road, Bucharest is located 182.5 km from Brașov, 202.9 km from Constanța, 407.6 km from Iași, 451.2 km from Cluj-Napoca, and 544.1 km from Timișoara.

A series of high-capacity boulevards, which generally radiate out from the city centre to the outskirts, provides a framework for the municipal road system. The main axes, which run north–south, east–west and northwest–southeast, as well as one internal and one external ring road, support the bulk of the traffic.

The city's roads are usually very crowded during rush hours, due to an increase in car ownership in recent years. In 2013, the number of cars registered in Bucharest amounted to 1,125,591. This results in wear and potholes appearing on busy roads, particularly secondary roads, this being identified as one of Bucharest's main infrastructural problems. A comprehensive effort on behalf of the City Hall to boost road infrastructure was made, and according to the general development plan, 2,000 roads have been repaired by 2008. The huge number of cars registered in the city forced the Romanian Auto Registry to switch to 3-digit numbers on registration plates in 2010.

On 17 June 2011, the Basarab Overpass was inaugurated and opened to traffic, thus completing the inner city traffic ring. The overpass took five years to build and is the longest cable-stayed bridge in Romania and the widest such bridge in Europe; upon completion, traffic on the Grant Bridge and in the Gara de Nord area became noticeably more fluid.

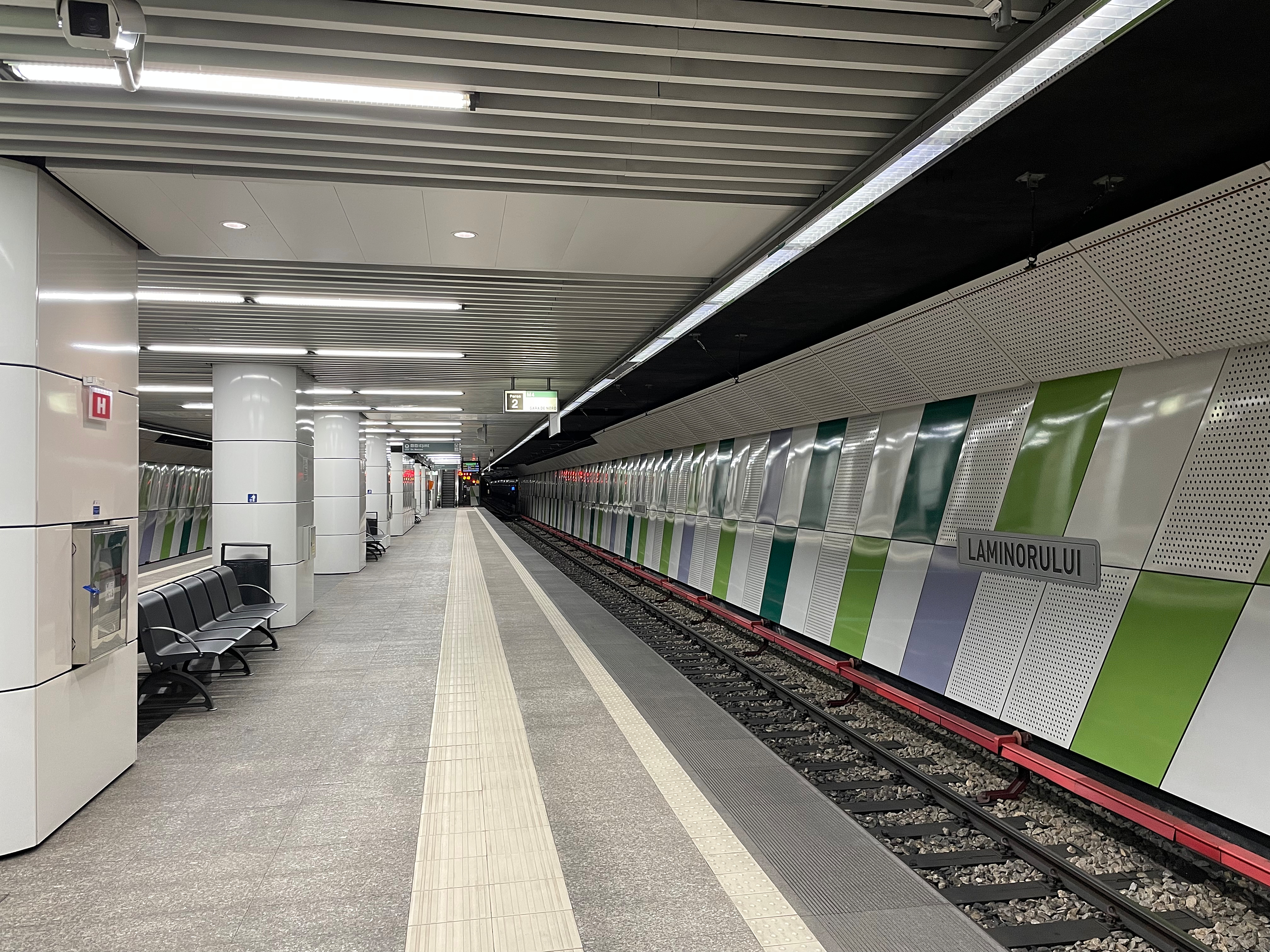
Bucharest Metro

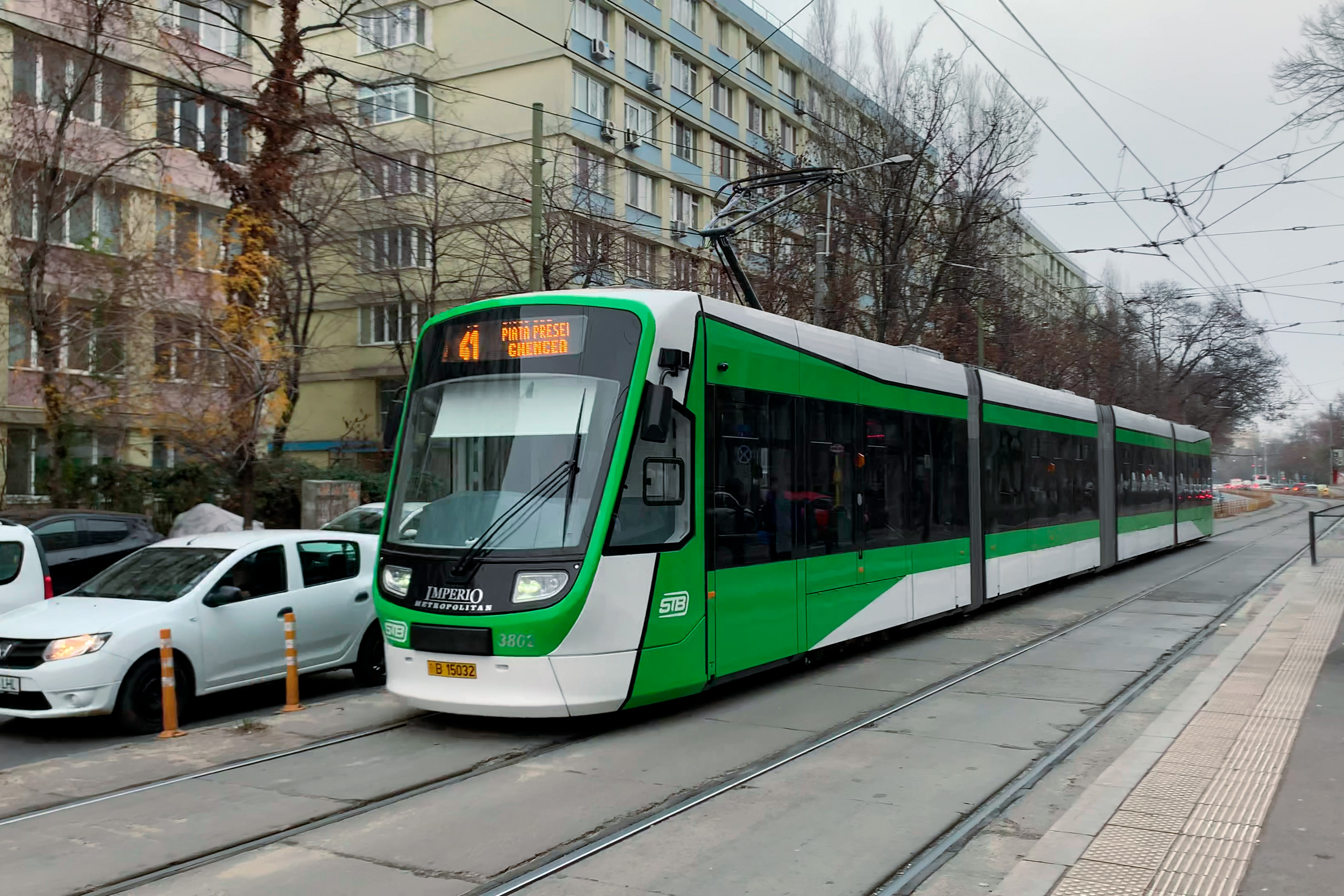
Astra Imperio

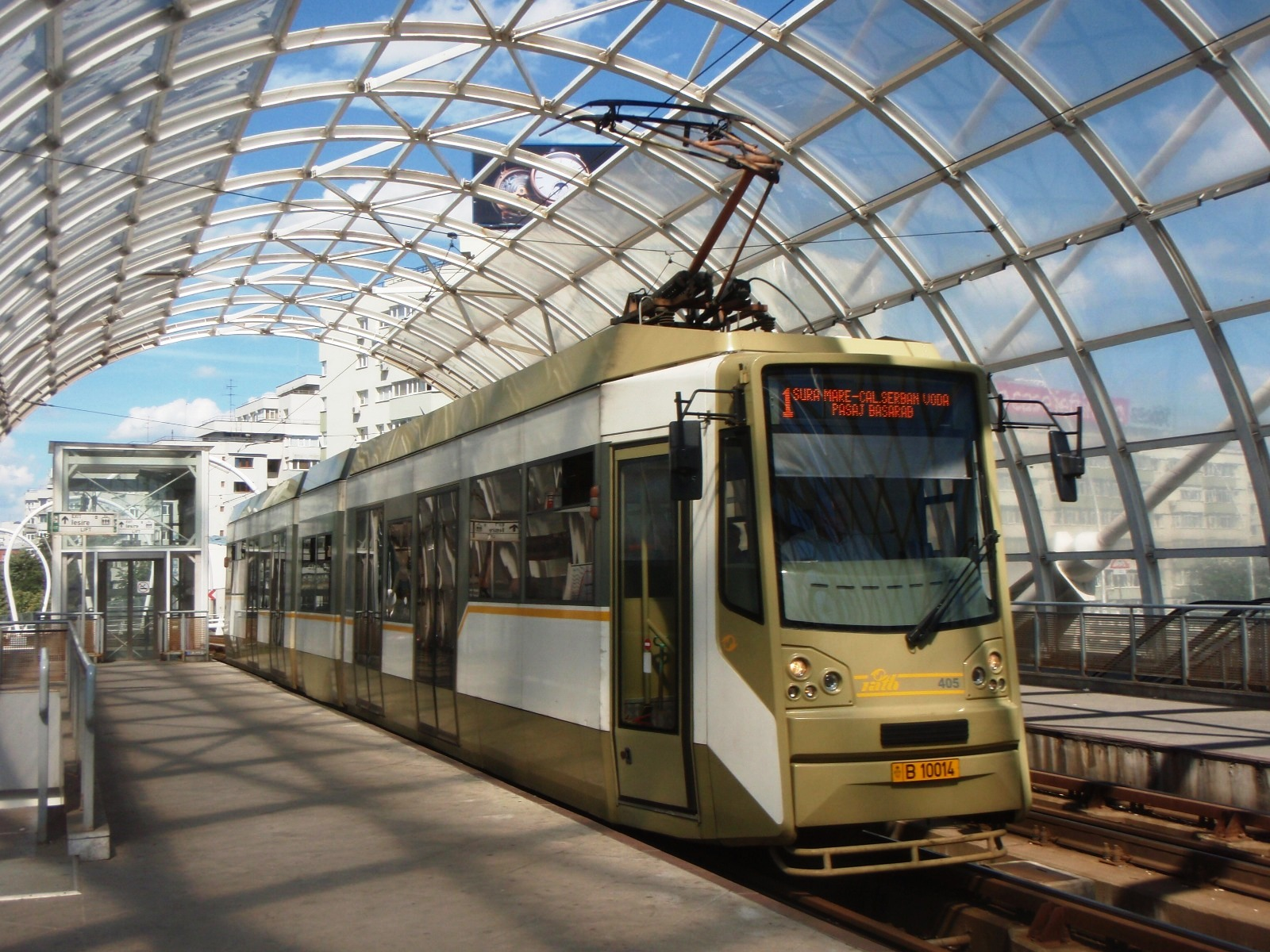
Bucur LF tram on Basarab Overpass

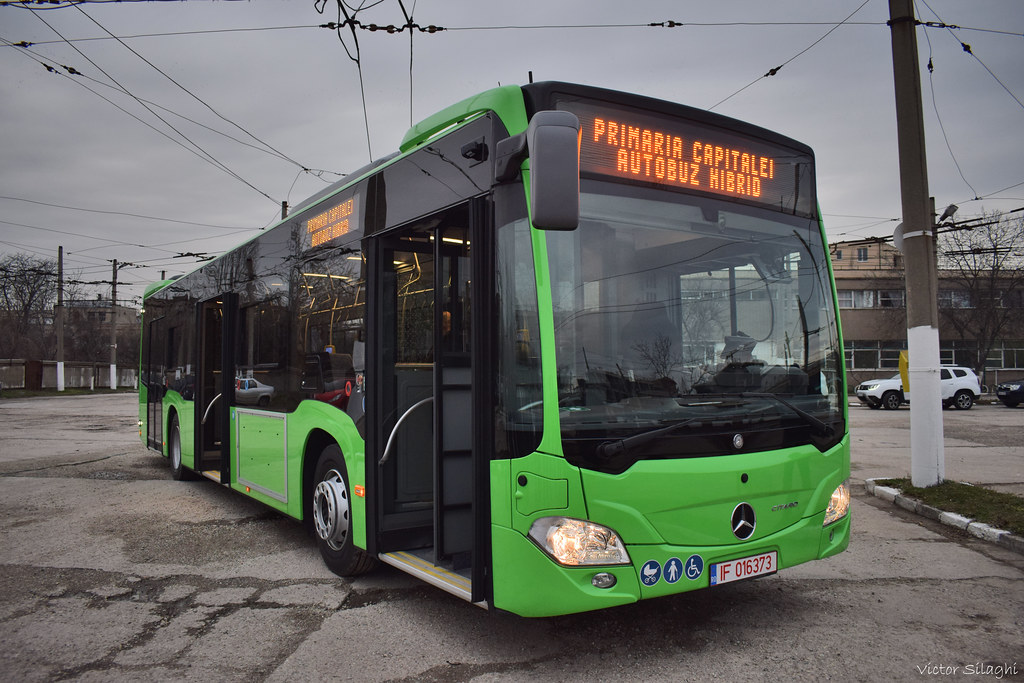
Mercedes-Benz Citaro

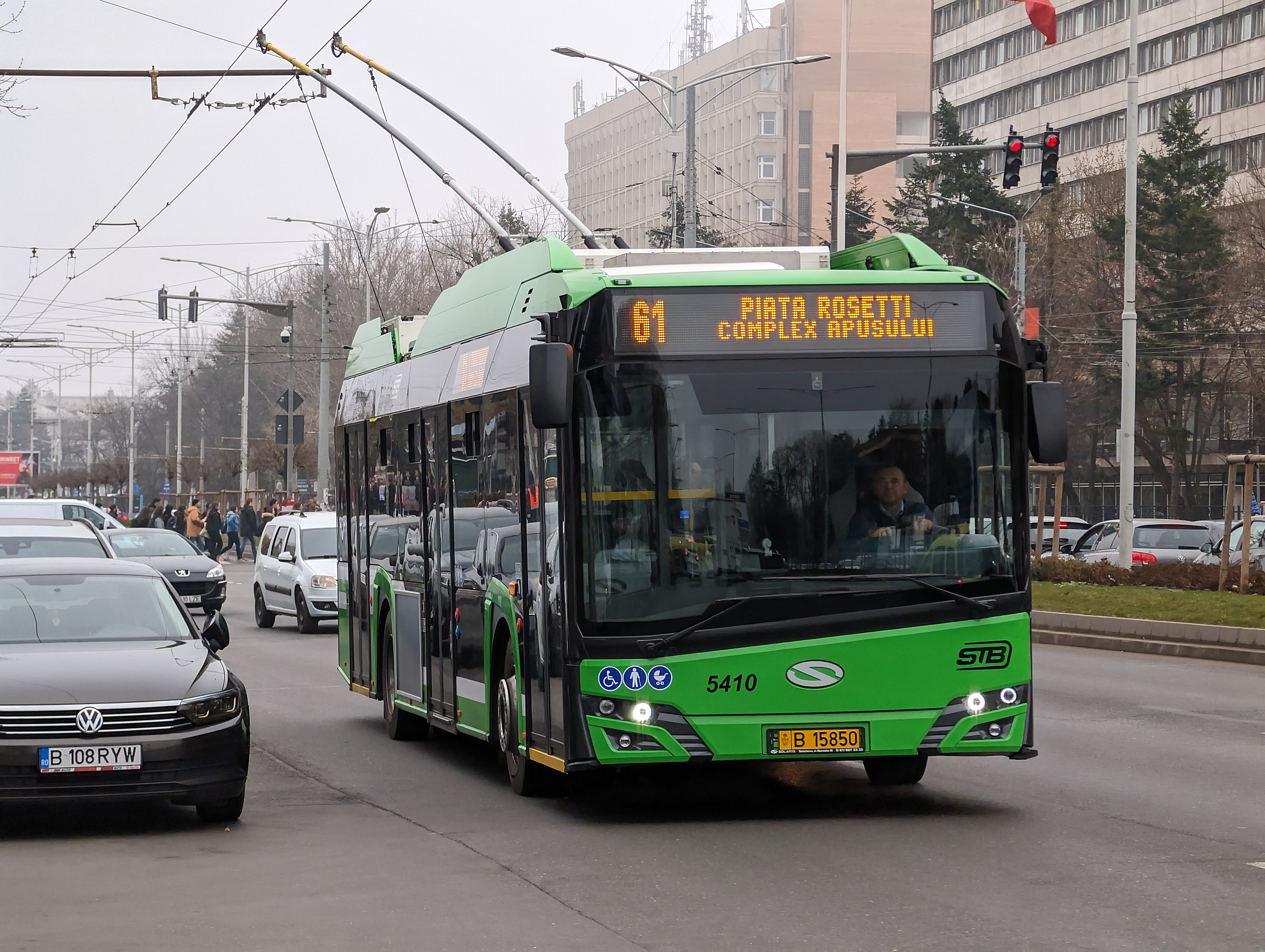
Solaris Trollino

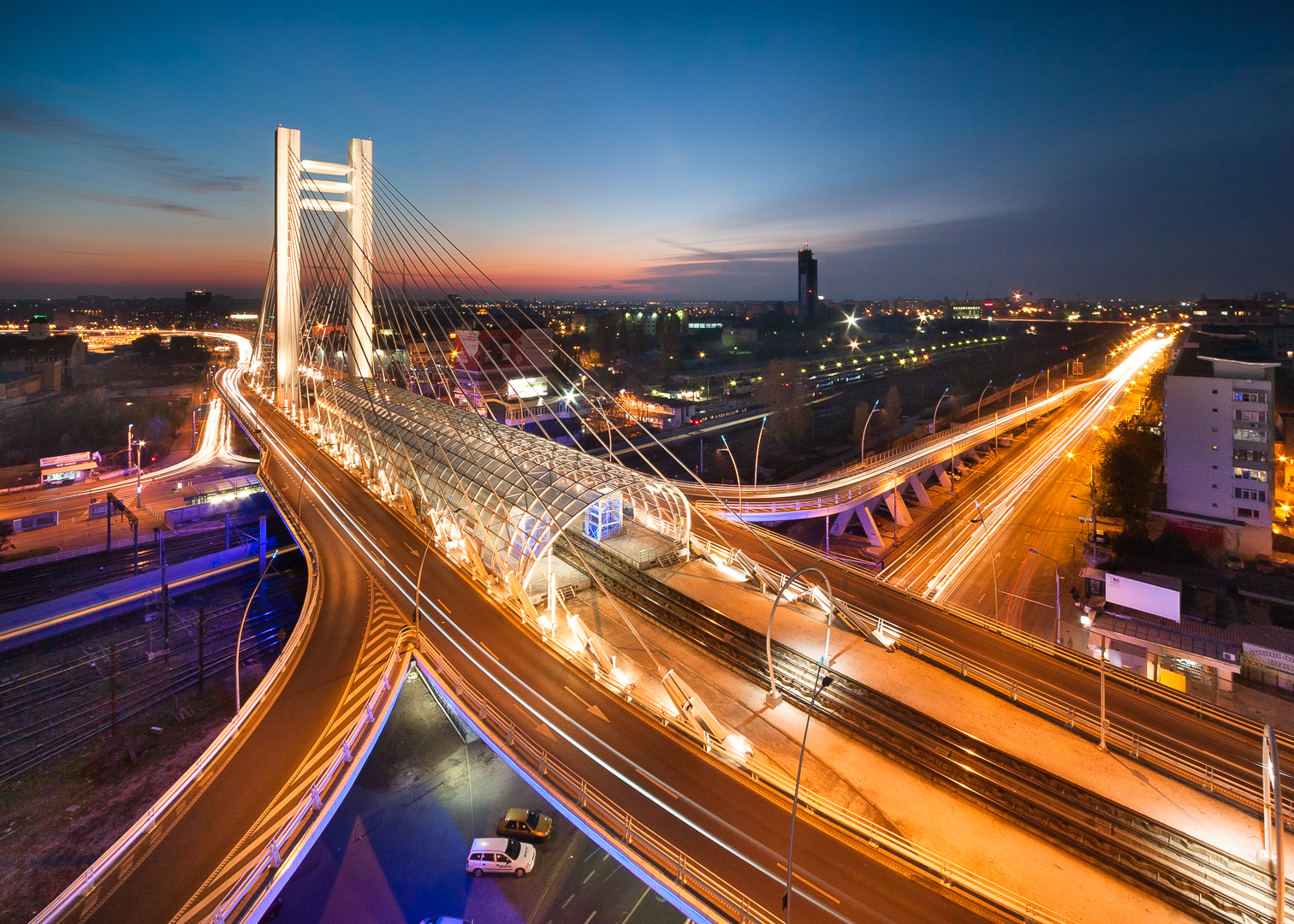
Basarab Overpass

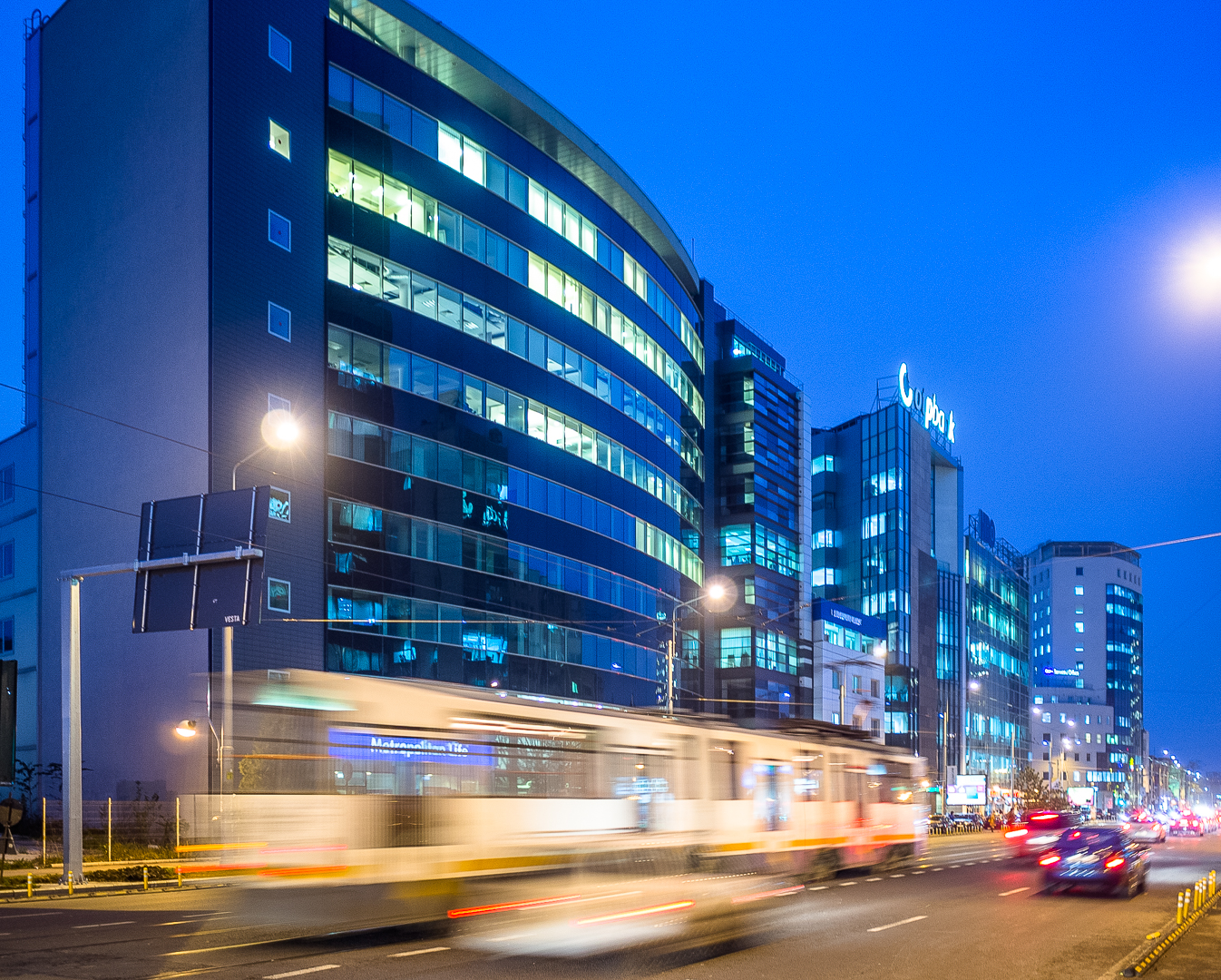
Buzești Street

=== Water ===
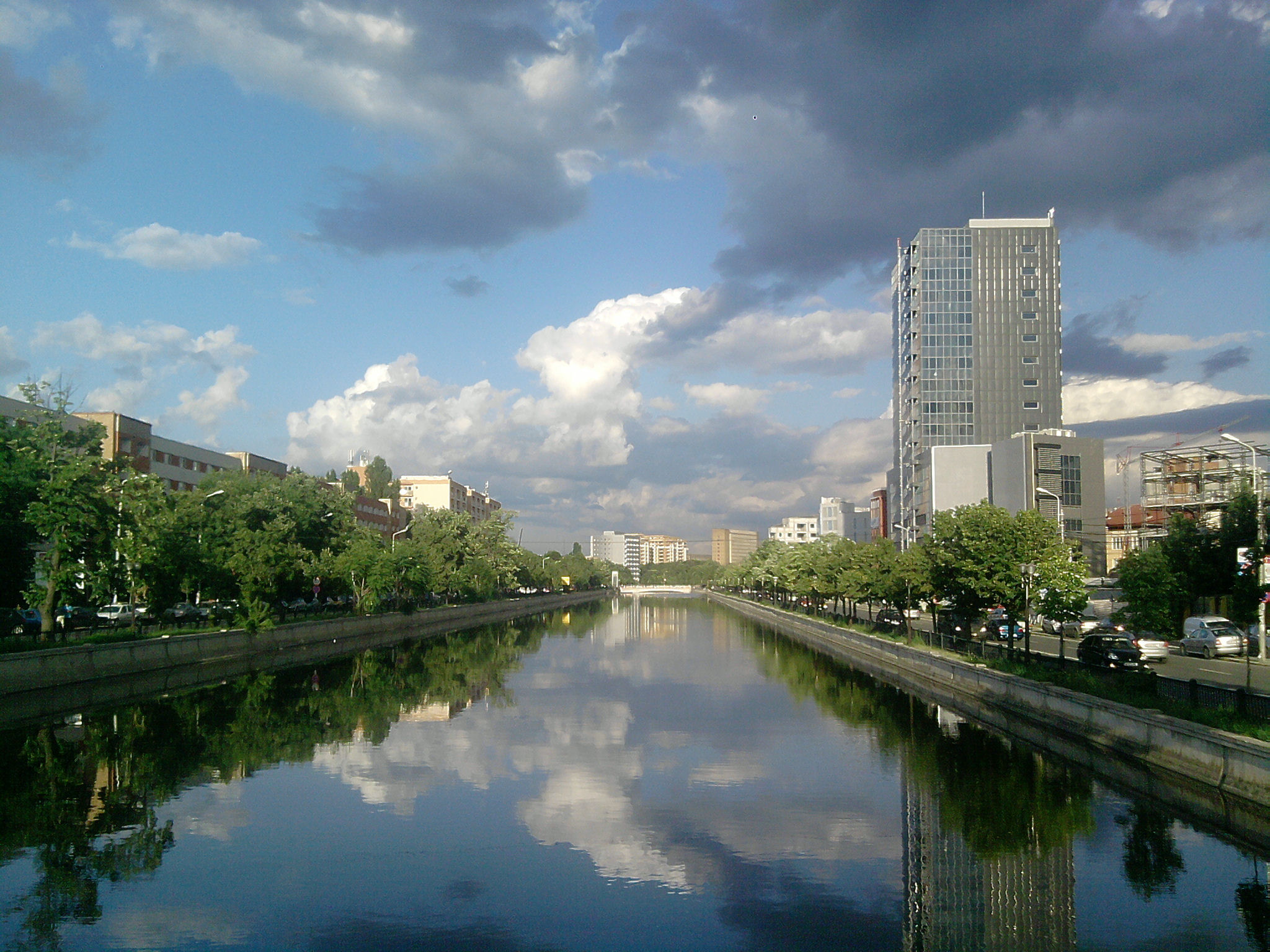
Dâmbovița river in Bucharest

Although it is situated on the banks of a river, Bucharest has never functioned as a port city. Other Romanian cities such as Constanța and Galați serve as the country's main ports. The unfinished Danube-Bucharest Canal, which is 73 km (45 mi) long and around 70% completed, could link Bucharest to the Danube River, and via the Danube-Black Sea Canal, to the Black Sea. Works on the canal were suspended in 1989, but proposals have been made to resume construction as part of the European Strategy for the Danube Region.

== Culture ==
Bucharest has a growing cultural scene, in fields including the visual arts, performing arts, and nightlife. Unlike other parts of Romania, such as the Black Sea coast or Transylvania, Bucharest's cultural scene has no defined style, and instead incorporates elements of Romanian and international culture.

=== Landmarks ===
Bucharest has landmark buildings and monuments. Perhaps the most prominent of these is the Palace of the Parliament, built in the 1980s during the rule of Communist dictator Nicolae Ceaușescu. The largest Parliament building in the world, the palace houses the Romanian Parliament (the Chamber of Deputies, and the Senate), as well as the National Museum of Contemporary Art. The building boasts one of the largest convention centres in the world.

Another landmark in Bucharest is Arcul de Triumf ("The Triumphal Arch"), built in its current form in 1935 and modelled after the Arc de Triomphe in Paris. A newer landmark of the city is the Memorial of Rebirth, a stylised marble pillar unveiled in 2005 to commemorate the victims of the Romanian Revolution of 1989, which overthrew Communism. The abstract monument sparked controversy when it was unveiled, being dubbed with names such as 'the olive on the toothpick' (măslina-n scobitoare), as many argued that it does not fit in its surroundings and believed that its choice was political.

The Romanian Athenaeum building is considered a symbol of Romanian culture and since 2007 has been on the list of the Label of European Heritage sites. It was built between 1886 and 1888 by the architect Paul Louis Albert Galeron, through public funding.

InterContinental Bucharest is a high-rise five-star hotel near University Square and is also a landmark of the city. The building is designed so that each room has a unique panorama of the city.

House of the Spark (Casa Scânteii) is a replica of the Lomonosov Moscow State University. This edifice, built in the characteristic style of the large-scale Soviet projects, was intended to be representative of the new political regime and to assert the superiority of the Communist doctrine. Construction started in 1952 and was completed in 1957, a few years after Stalin's death in 1953. Popularly known as Casa Scânteii ('House of the Spark') after the name of the official gazette of the Central Committee of the Romanian Communist Party, Scânteia, it was made for the purpose of bringing together under one roof all of Bucharest's official press and publishing houses. It is the only building in Bucharest featuring the Hammer and Sickle, the Red Star and other communist insignia carved into medallions adorning the façade.

Other cultural venues include the National Museum of Art of Romania, Grigore Antipa National Museum of Natural History, Museum of the Romanian Peasant, National History Museum and the Military Museum.

The Triumphal Arch was inaugurated in 1936.

With a price tag of $250 million, Floreasca City Center opened in 2012.

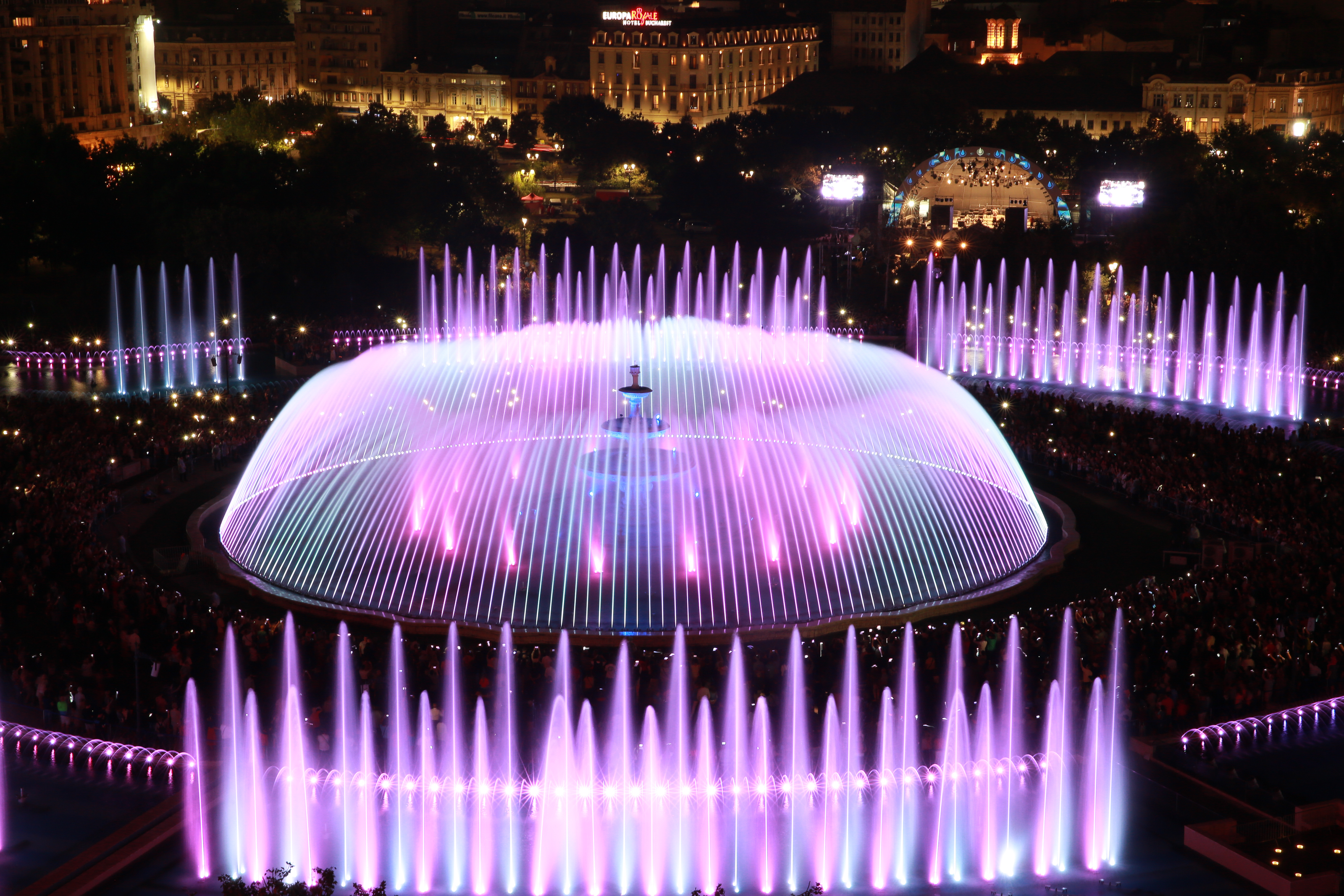
Downtown Bucharest fountains in the Unirii Square

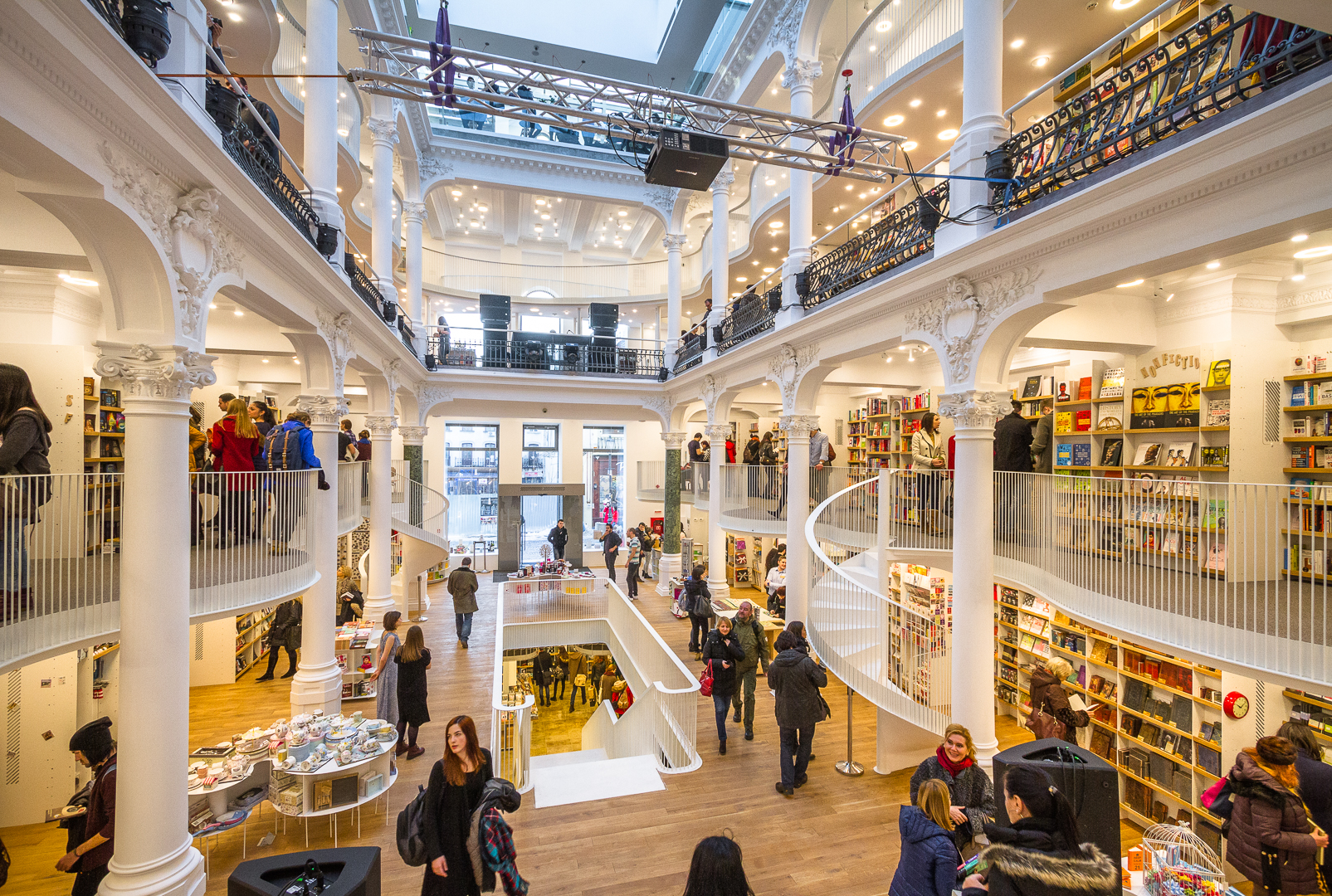
Interior of the Cărturești Carusel Bookstore

The New National Library of Romania, with a price of €110 million.

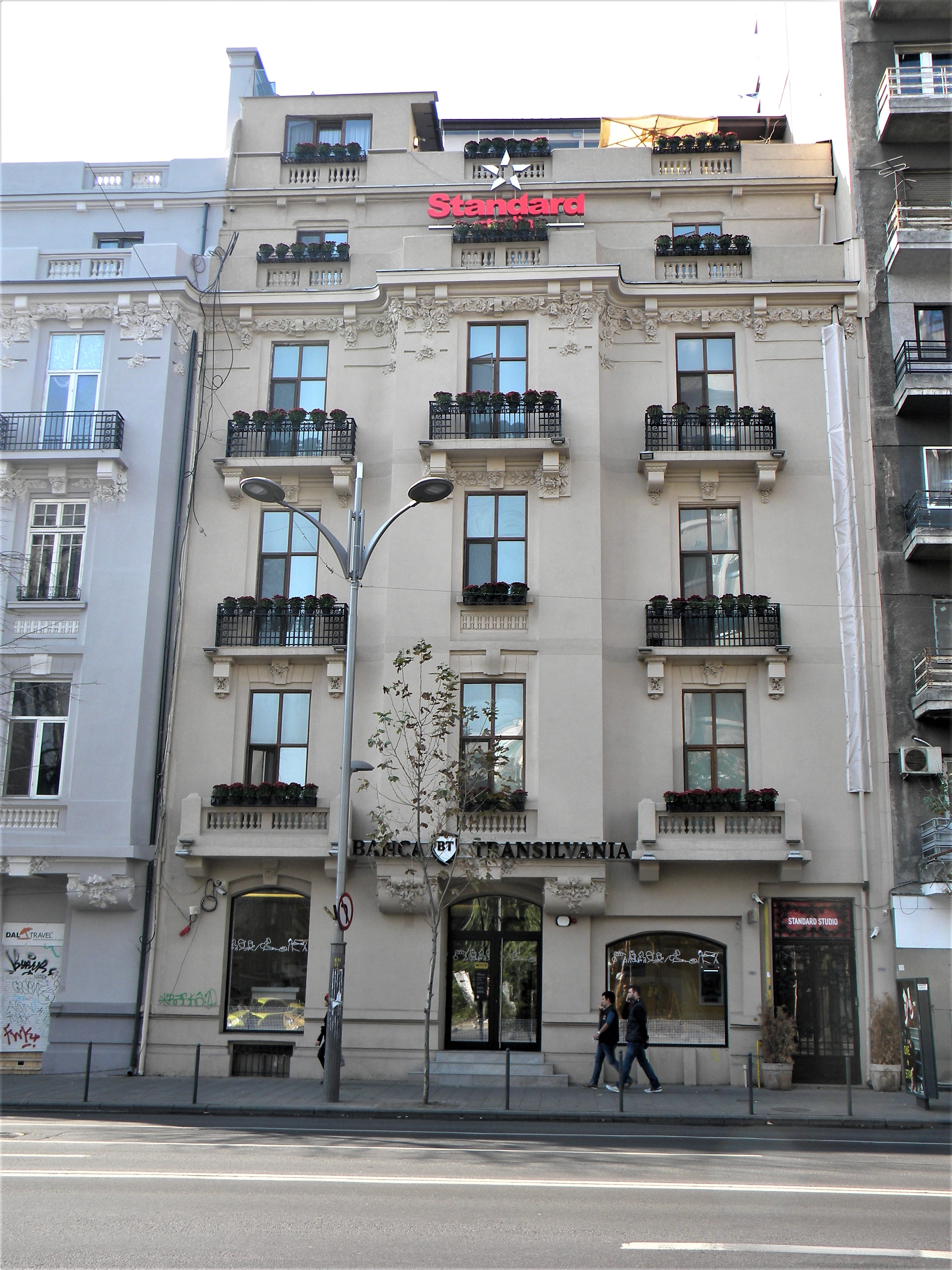
Magheru Boulevard is one of the most expensive streets in the world.

=== Visual arts ===
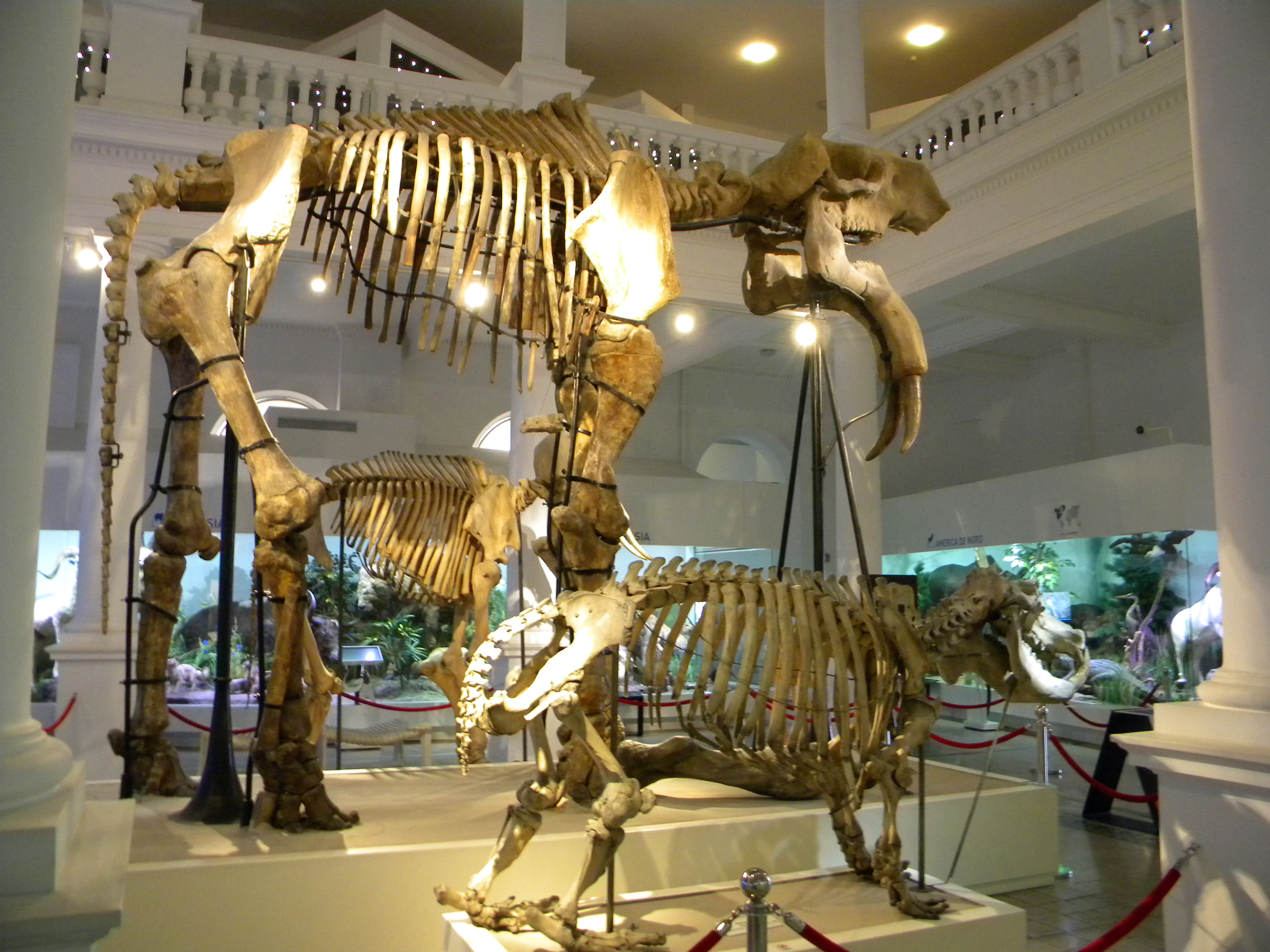
Grigore Antipa National Museum of Natural History

In terms of visual arts, the city has museums featuring both classical and contemporary Romanian art, as well as selected international works. The National Museum of Art of Romania is perhaps the best-known of Bucharest museums. It is located in the royal palace and features collections of medieval and modern Romanian art, including works by sculptor Constantin Brâncuși, as well as an international collection assembled by the Romanian royal family.

Other, smaller, museums contain specialised collections. The Zambaccian Museum, which is situated in the former home of art collector Krikor H. Zambaccian, contains works by well-known Romanian artists and international artists such as Paul Cézanne, Eugène Delacroix, Henri Matisse, Camille Pissarro, and Pablo Picasso.

The Gheorghe Tattarescu Museum contains portraits of Romanian revolutionaries in exile such as Gheorghe Magheru, Ștefan Golescu, and Nicolae Bălcescu, and allegorical compositions with revolutionary (Romania's rebirth, 1849) and patriotic (The Principalities' Unification, 1857) themes. Another impressive art collection gathering important Romanian painters, can be found at the Ligia and Pompiliu Macovei residence, which is open to visitors as it is now part of the Bucharest Museum patrimony.

The Theodor Pallady Museum is situated in one of the oldest surviving merchant houses in Bucharest and includes works by Romanian painter Theodor Pallady, as well as European and oriental furniture pieces. The Museum of Art Collections contains the collections of Romanian art aficionados, including Krikor Zambaccian and Theodor Pallady.

Despite the classical art galleries and museums in the city, a contemporary arts scene also exists. The National Museum of Contemporary Art (MNAC), situated in a wing of the Palace of the Parliament, was opened in 2004 and contains Romanian and international contemporary art. The MNAC also manages the Kalinderu MediaLab, which caters to multimedia and experimental art. Private art galleries are scattered throughout the city centre.

The palace of the National Bank of Romania houses the national numismatic collection. Exhibits include banknotes, coins, documents, photographs, maps, silver and gold bullion bars, bullion coins, and dies and moulds. The building was constructed between 1884 and 1890. The thesaurus room contains notable marble decorations.

=== Performing arts ===
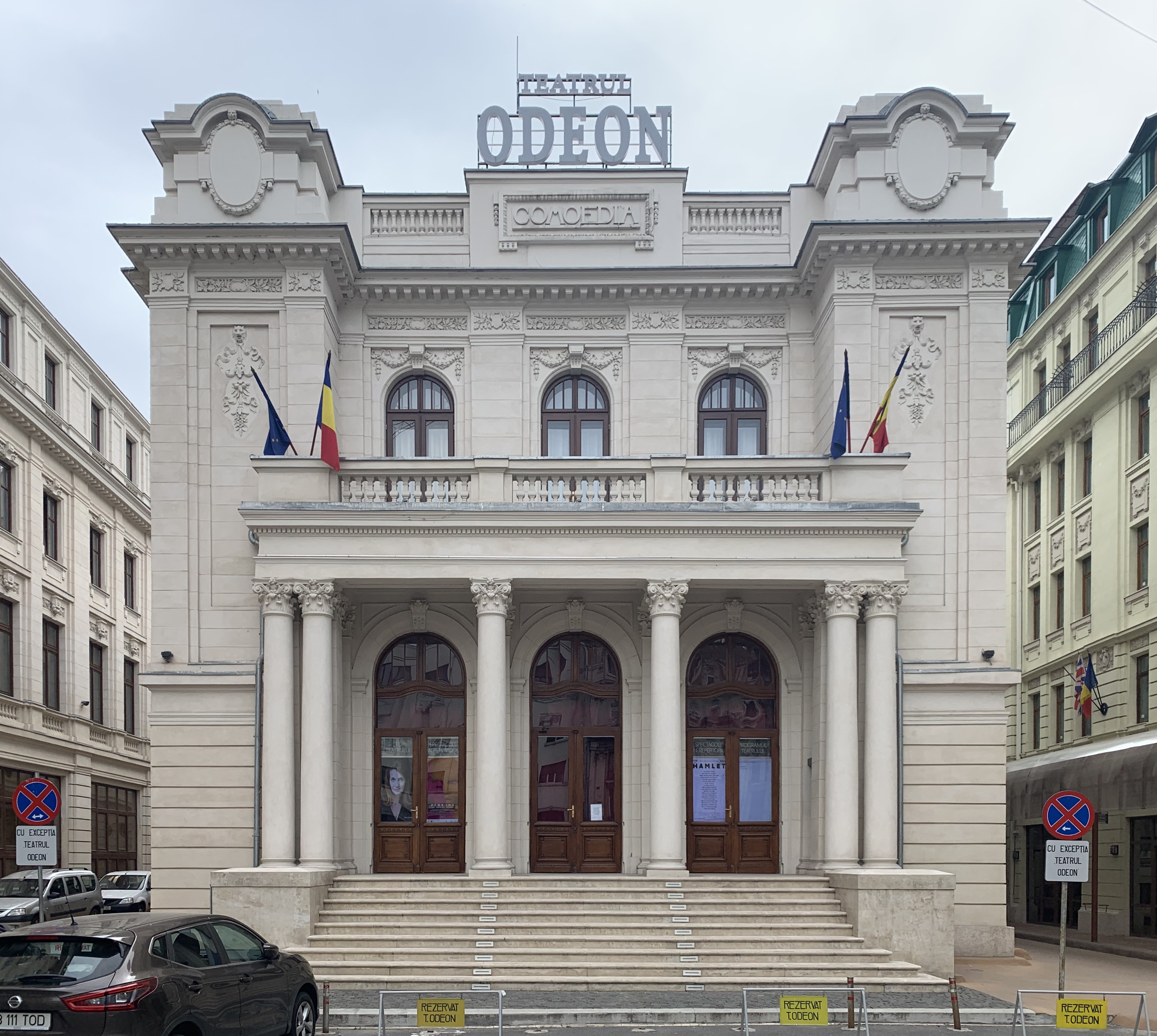
Odeon Theatre

Performing arts are some of the strongest cultural elements of Bucharest. The most famous symphony orchestra is National Radio Orchestra of Romania. One of the most prominent buildings is the neoclassical Romanian Athenaeum, which was founded in 1852, and hosts classical music concerts, the George Enescu Festival, and is home to the George Enescu Philharmonic Orchestra.

Bucharest is home to the Romanian National Opera and the I.L. Caragiale National Theatre. Another well-known theatre in Bucharest is the State Jewish Theatre, which features plays starring world-renowned Romanian-Jewish actress Maia Morgenstern. Smaller theatres throughout the city cater to specific genres, such as the Comedy Theatre, the Nottara Theatre, the Bulandra Theatre, the Odeon Theatre, and the revue theatre of Constantin Tănase.

=== Music and nightlife ===
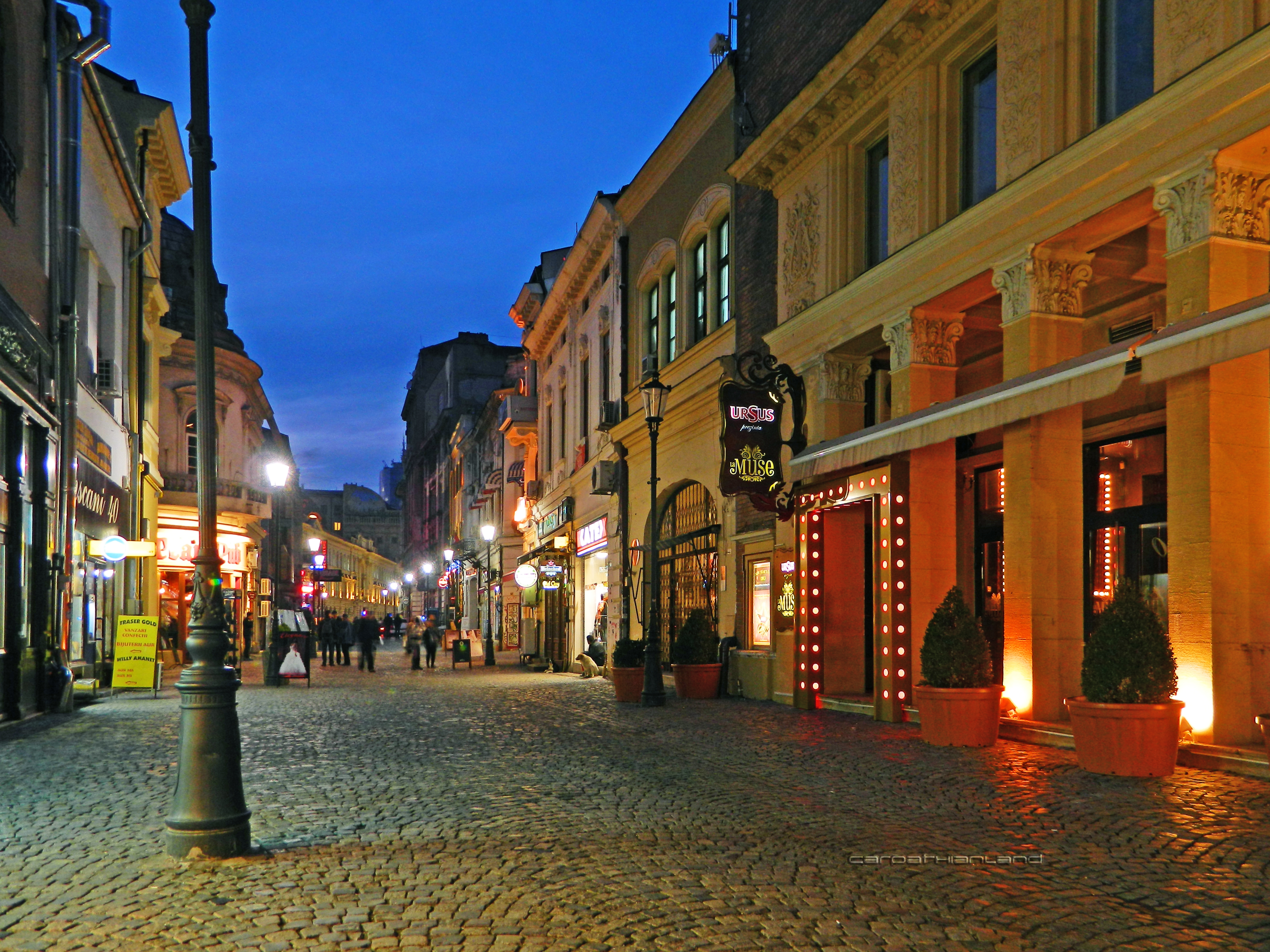
The Old Town is the heart of Bucharest nightlife.

Bucharest is home to Romania's largest recording labels, and is often the residence of Romanian musicians. Romanian rock bands of the 1970s and 1980s, such as Iris and Holograf, continue to be popular, particularly with the middle-aged, while since the beginning of the 1990s, the hip hop/rap scene has developed. Hip-hop bands and artists from Bucharest such as B.U.G. Mafia, Paraziții, and La Familia enjoy national and international recognition.

The pop-rock band Taxi have been gaining international respect, as has Spitalul de Urgență's raucous updating of traditional Romanian music. While many neighbourhood discos play manele, an Oriental- and Roma-influenced genre of music that is particularly popular in Bucharest's working-class districts, the city has a rich jazz and blues scene, and to an even larger extent, house music/trance and heavy metal/punk scenes. Bucharest's jazz profile has especially risen since 2002, with the presence of two venues, Green Hours and Art Jazz, as well as an American presence alongside established Romanians.

With no central nightlife strip, entertainment venues are dispersed throughout the city, with clusters in Lipscani and Regie.

=== Cultural events and festivals ===
A number of cultural festivals are held in Bucharest throughout the year, but most festivals take place in June, July, and August. The National Opera organises the International Opera Festival every year in May and June, which includes ensembles and orchestras from all over the world.

The Romanian Athaeneum Society hosts the George Enescu Festival at locations throughout the city in September every two years (odd years). The Museum of the Romanian Peasant and the Village Museum organise events throughout the year, showcasing Romanian folk arts and crafts.

In the 2000s, due to the growing prominence of the Chinese community in Bucharest, Chinese cultural events took place. The first officially organised Chinese festival was the Chinese New Year's Eve Festival of February 2005, which took place in Nichita Stănescu Park and was organised by the Bucharest City Hall.

In 2005, Bucharest was the first city in Southeastern Europe to host the international CowParade, which resulted in dozens of decorated cow sculptures being placed across the city.

In 2004, Bucharest imposed in the circle of important festivals in Eastern Europe with the Bucharest International Film Festival, an event widely acknowledged in Europe, having as guests of honour famous names from the world cinema: Andrei Konchalovsky, Danis Tanović, Nikita Mikhalkov, Rutger Hauer, Jerzy Skolimowski, Jan Harlan, Radu Mihăileanu, and many others.

Since 2005, Bucharest has its own contemporary art biennale, the Bucharest Biennale.

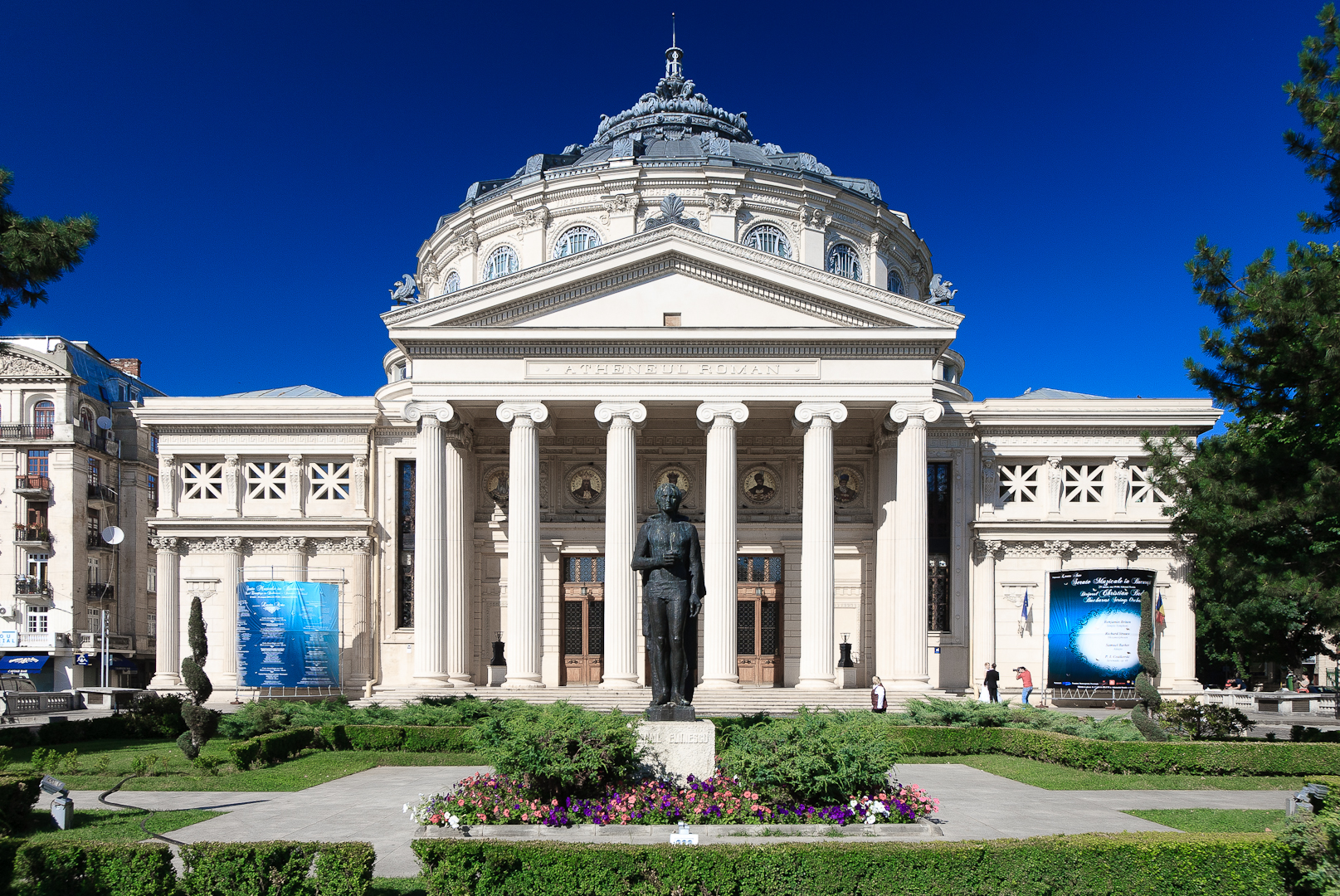
Romanian Athenaeum

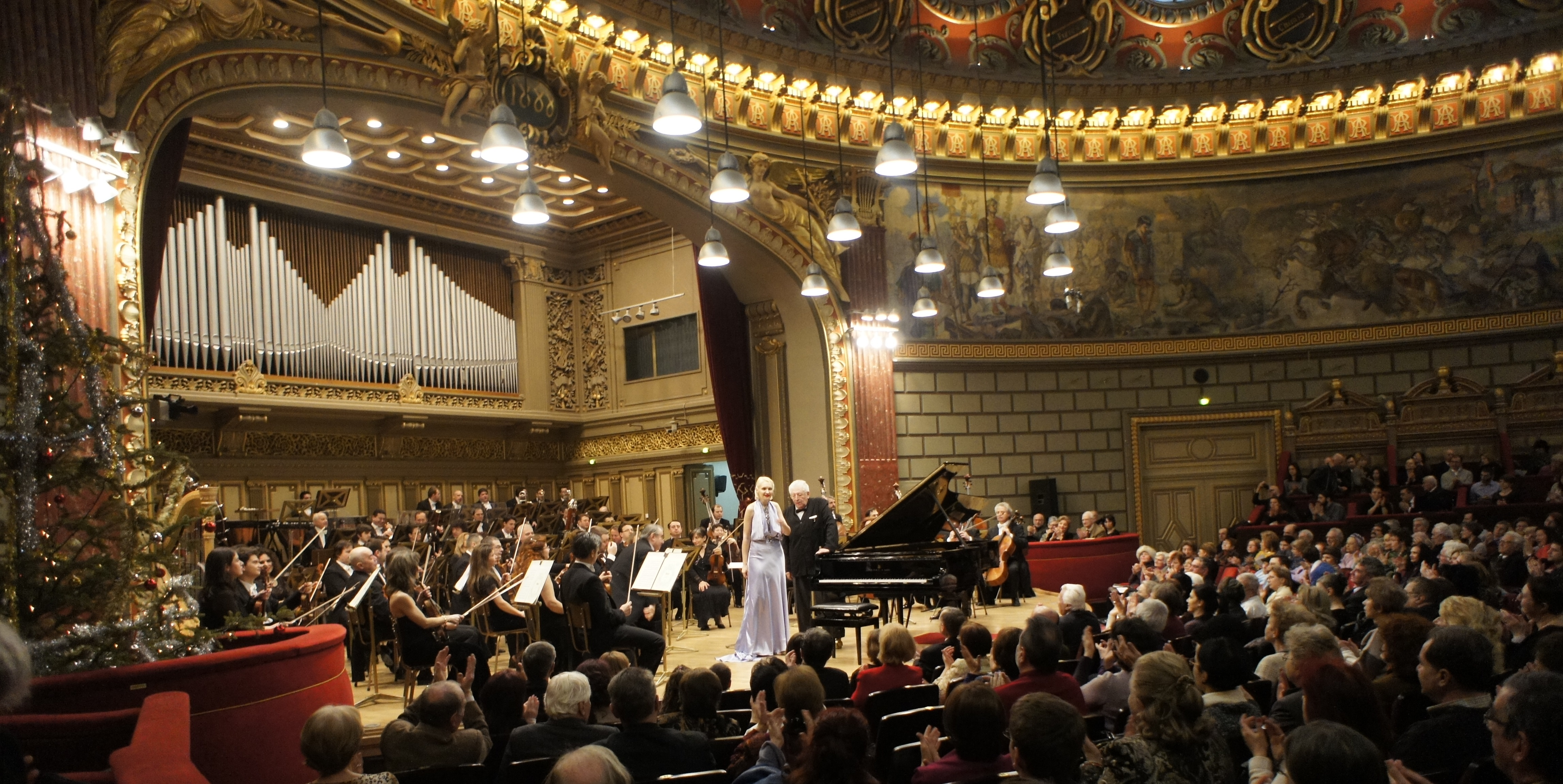
George Enescu Festival

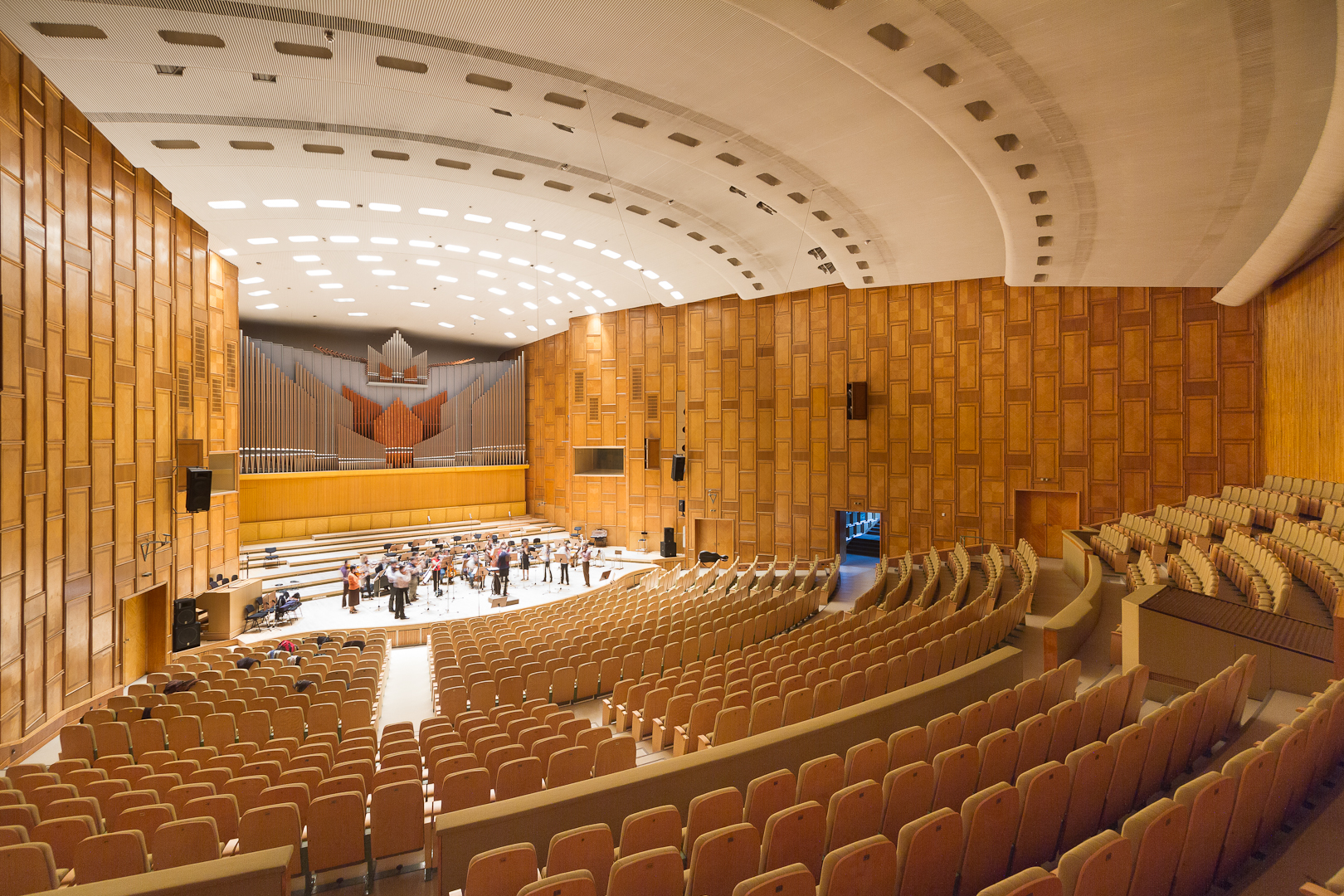
Mihail Jora Hall

=== Traditional culture ===
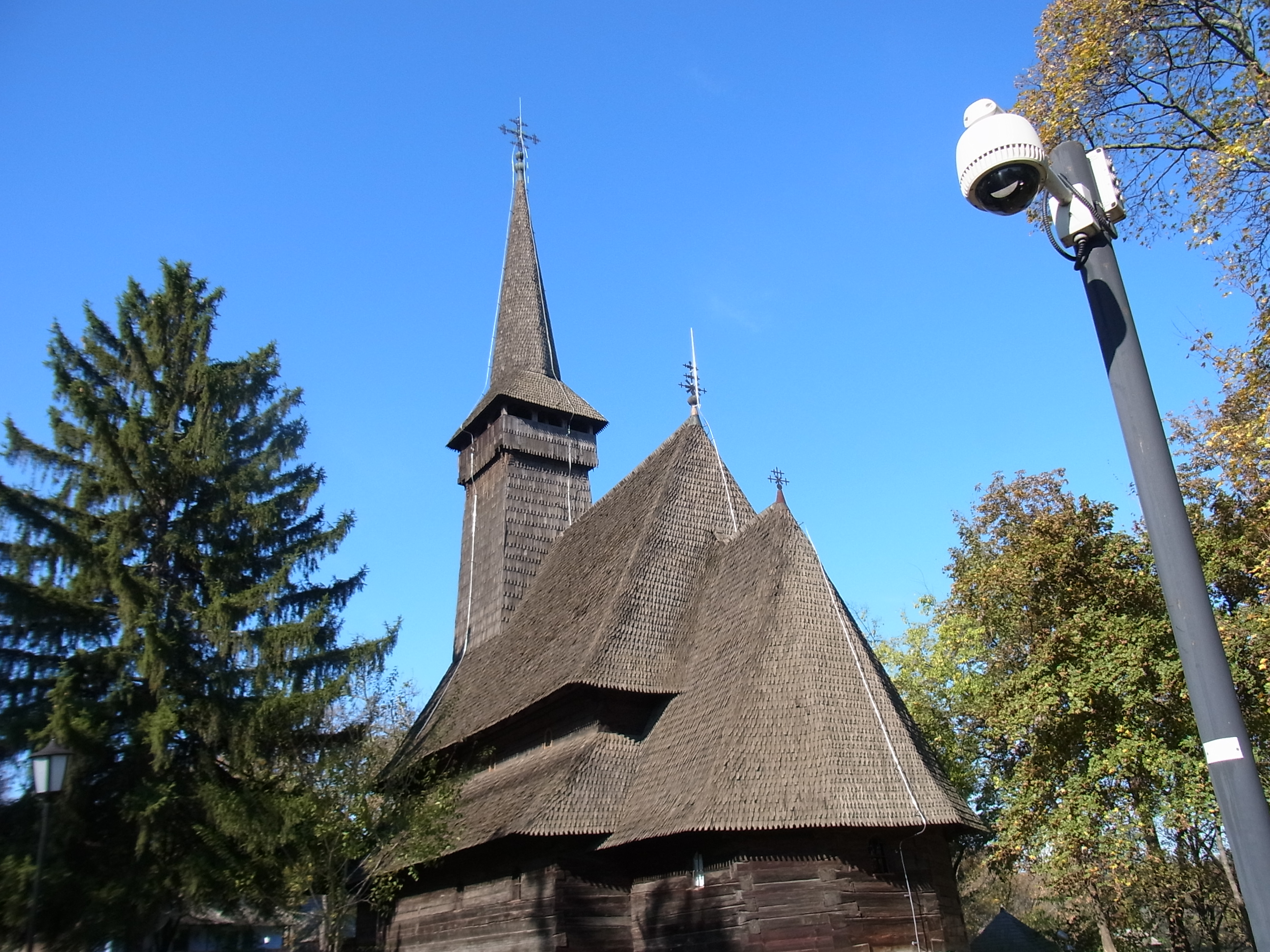
Traditional wooden church at the Village Museum

Traditional Romanian culture continues to have a major influence in arts such as theatre, film, and music. Bucharest has two internationally renowned ethnographic museums, the Museum of the Romanian Peasant and the open-air Dimitrie Gusti National Village Museum, in King Michael I Park. It contains 272 authentic buildings and peasant farms from all over Romania.

The Museum of the Romanian Peasant was declared the European Museum of the Year in 1996. Patronised by the Ministry of Culture, the museum preserves and exhibits numerous collections of objects and monuments of material and spiritual culture. The Museum of the Romanian Peasant holds one of the richest collections of peasant objects in Romania, its heritage being nearly 90,000 pieces, those being divided into several collections: ceramics, costumes, textiles, wooden objects, religious objects, customs, etc.

The Museum of Romanian History is another important museum in Bucharest, containing a collection of artefacts detailing Romanian history and culture from the prehistoric times, Dacian era, medieval times, and the modern era.

=== Religion ===
Bucharest is the seat of the Patriarch of the Romanian Orthodox Church, one of the Eastern Orthodox churches in communion with the Patriarch of Constantinople, and also of its subdivisions, the Metropolis of Muntenia and Dobrudja and the Archbishopric of Bucharest. Orthodox believers consider Demetrius of Basarabov to be the patron saint of the city.

The city is a centre for other Christian organizations in Romania, including the Roman Catholic Archdiocese of Bucharest, established in 1883, and the Romanian Greek-Catholic Eparchy of Saint Basil the Great, founded in 2014.

Bucharest also hosts six synagogues, including the Choral Temple of Bucharest, the Great Synagogue of Bucharest and the Holy Union Temple. The latter was converted into the Museum of the History of the Romanian Jewish Community, while the Great Synagogue and the Choral Temple are both active and hold regular services.

A mosque with a capacity for 2,000 people was in the planning stages at 22–30 Expoziției Boulevard. The project was later abandoned due to financial problems and public protests. However, there are several smaller Sunni and Shia mosques active in Bucharest.

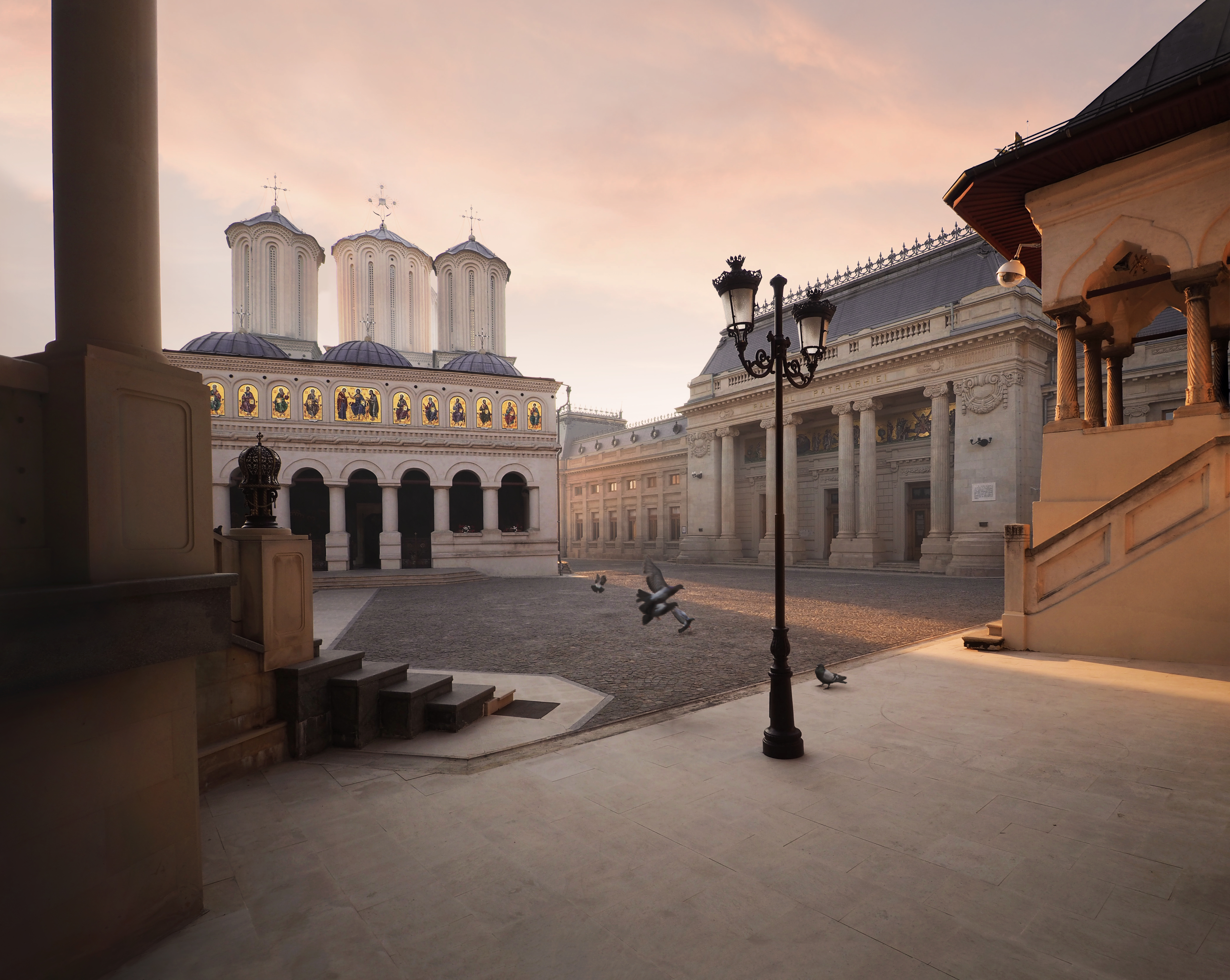
Dealul Mitropoliei

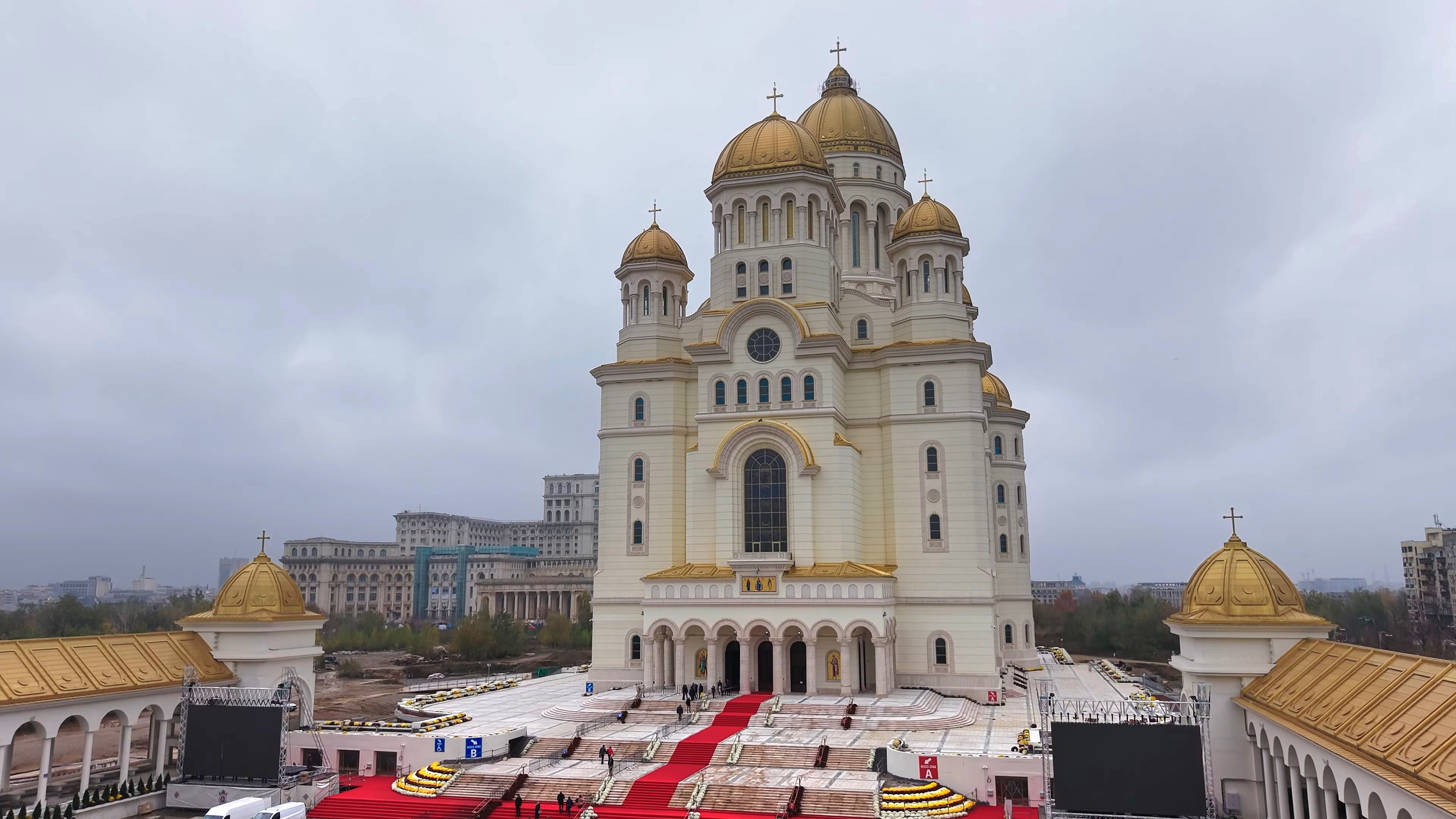
National Cathedral of Romania

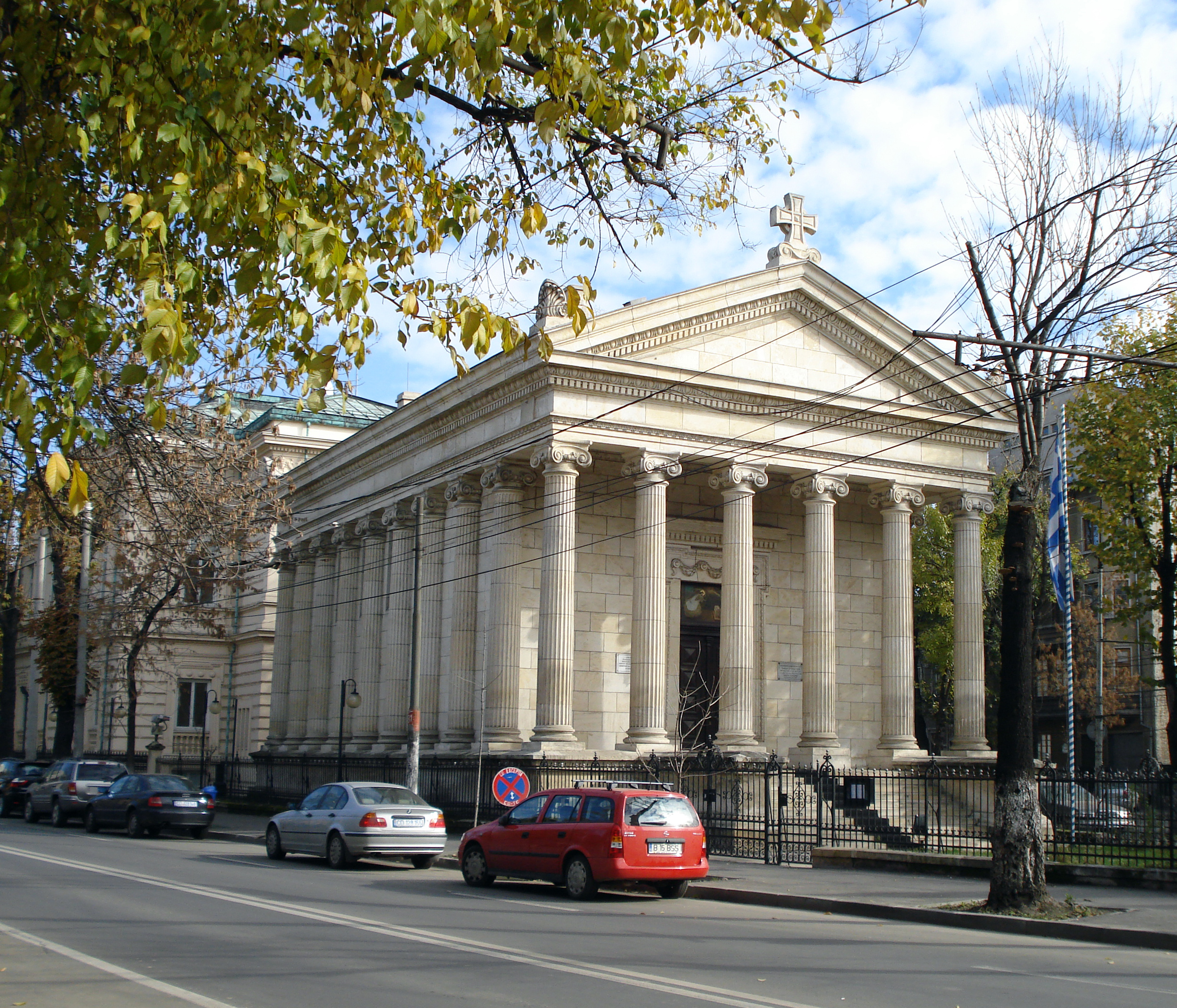
Greek Orthodox Church of Bucharest

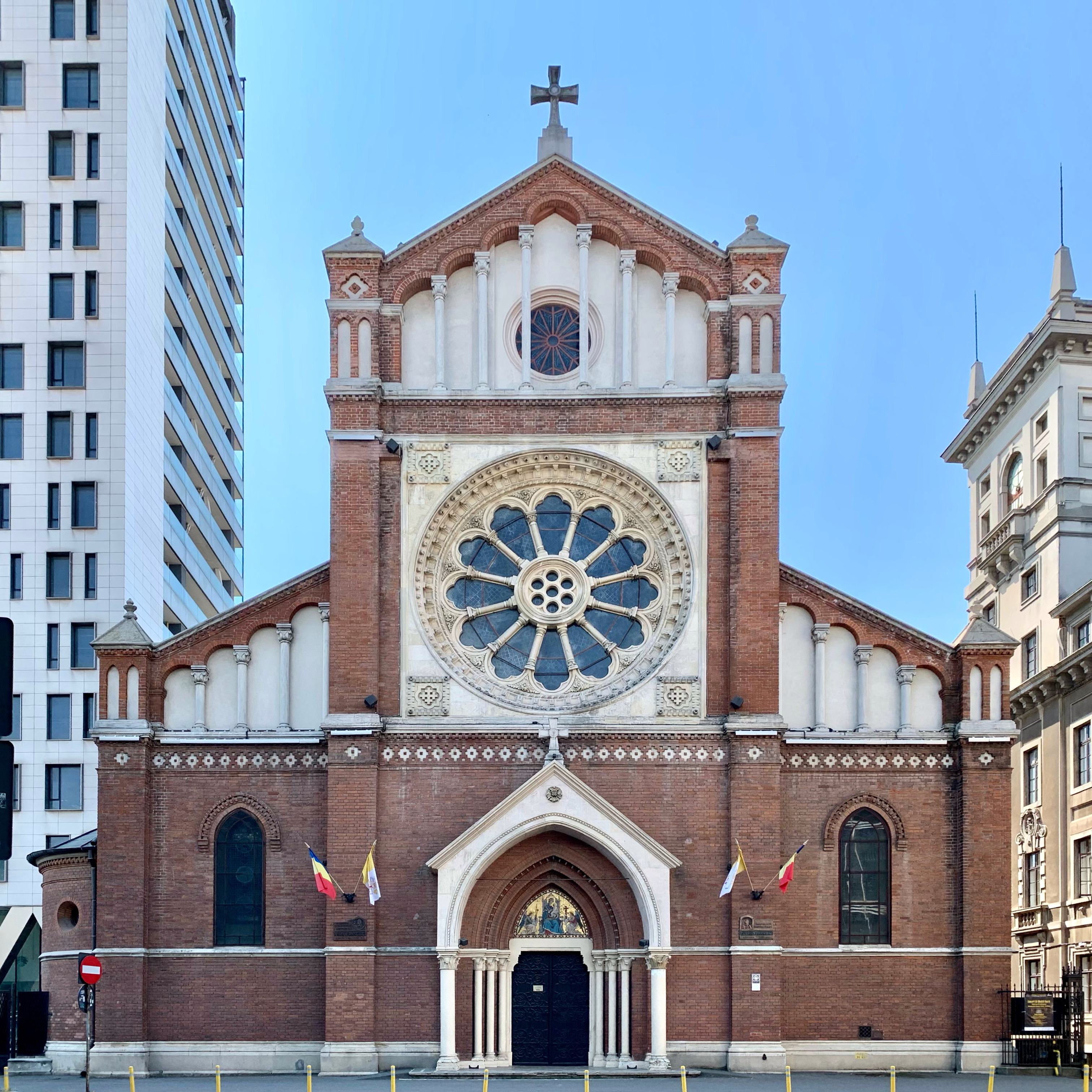
St. Joseph Roman Catholic Cathedral

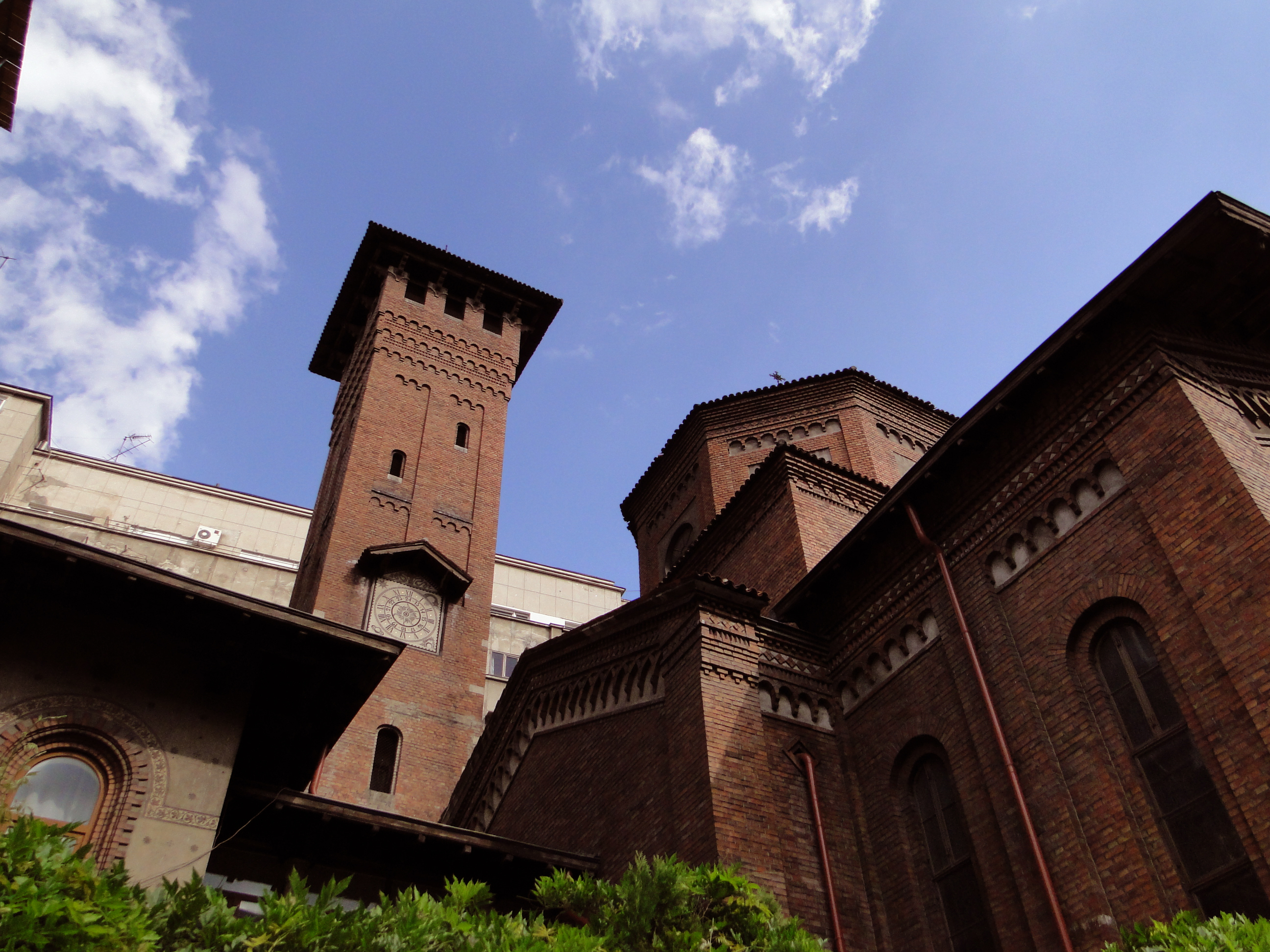
Italian Roman Catholic Church

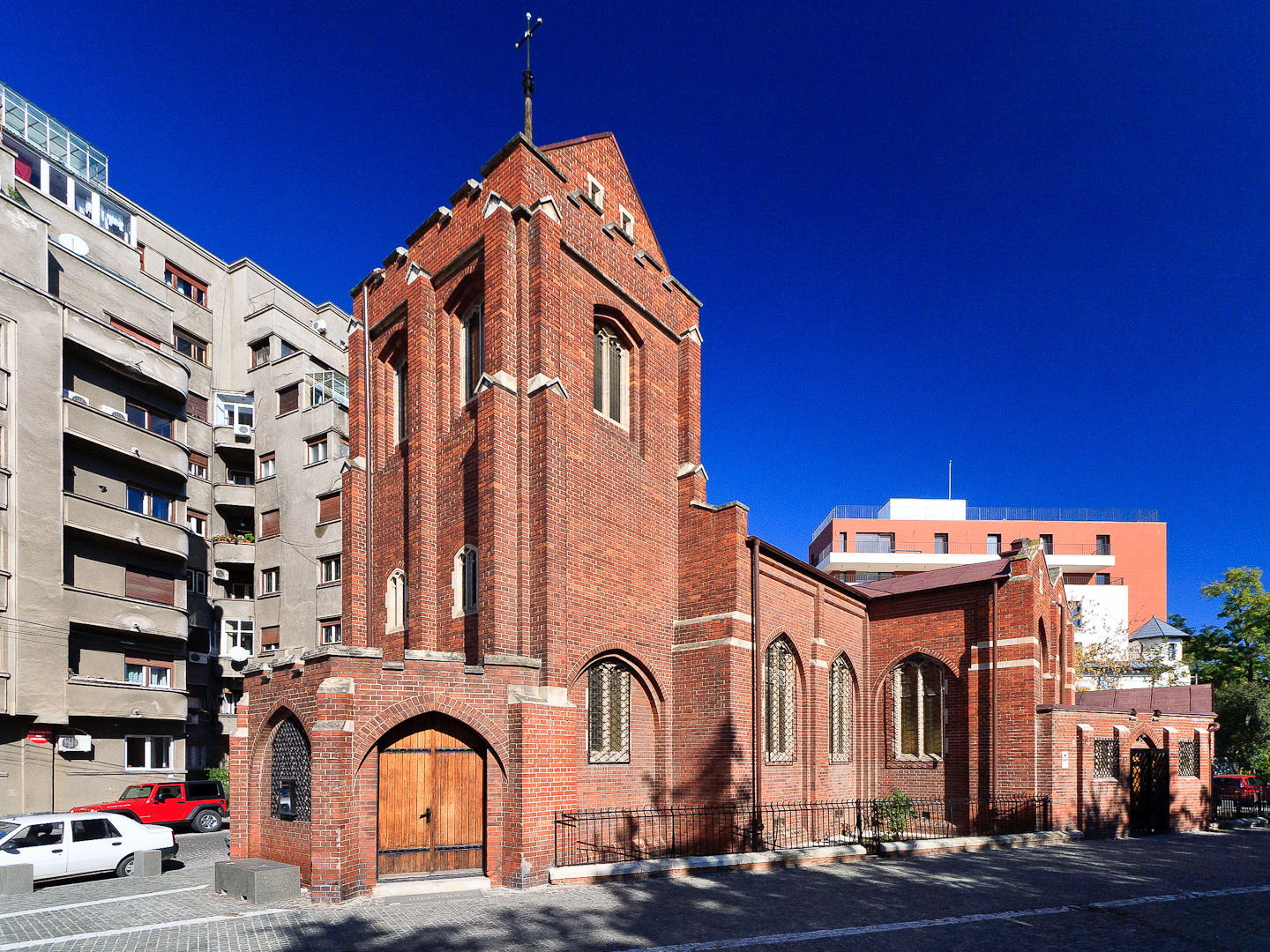
Anglican Church of the Resurrection

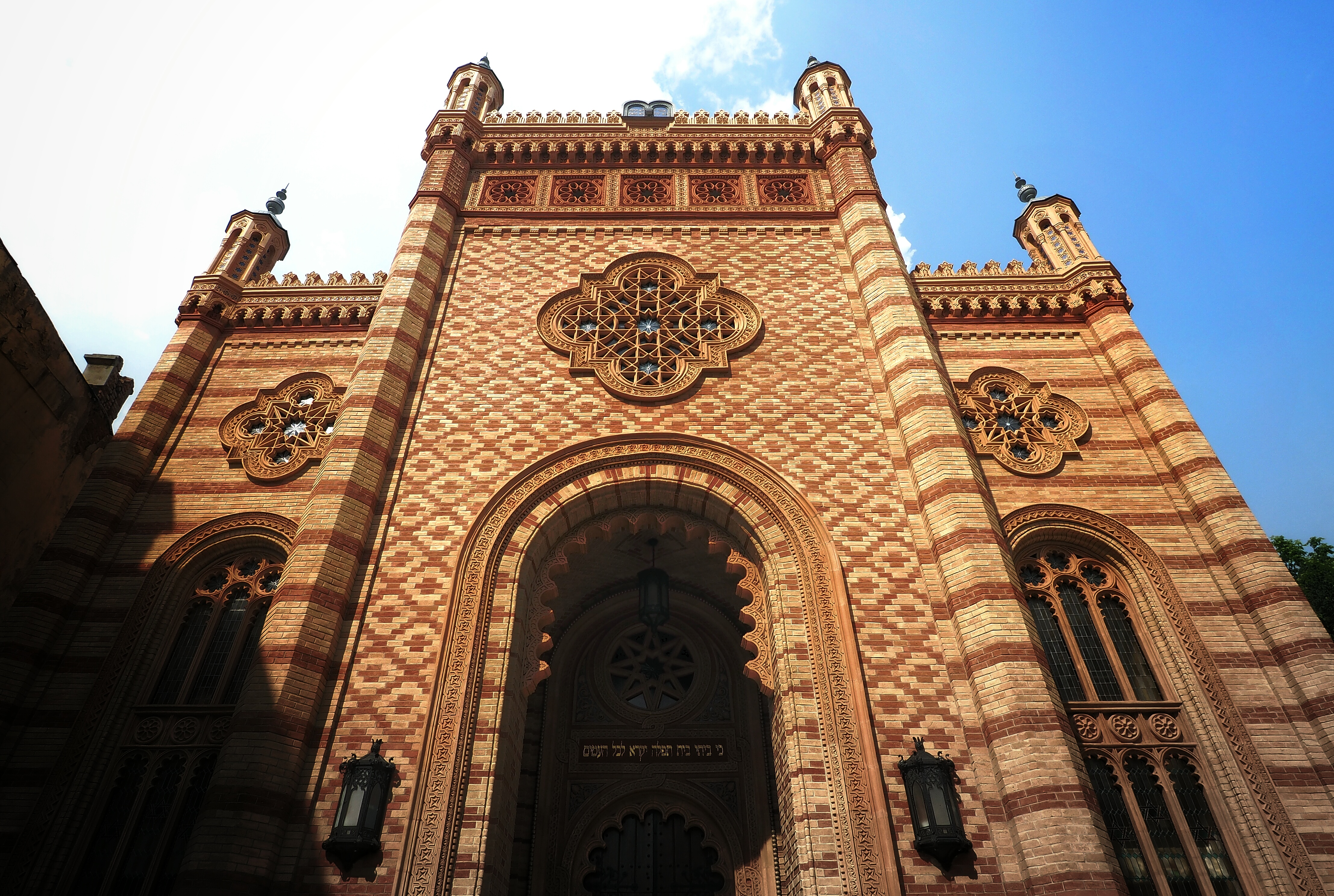
Choral Temple

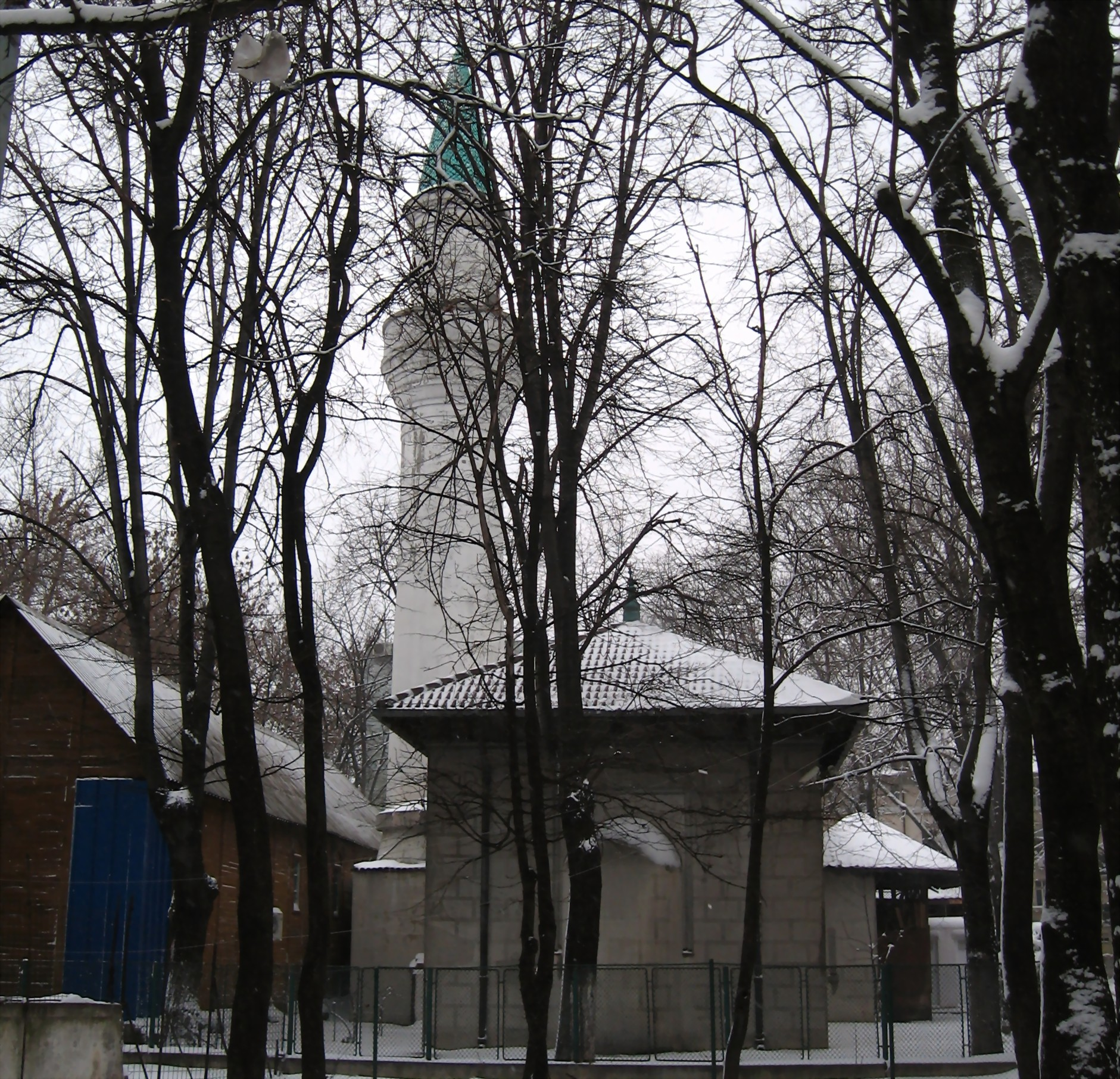
Carol-Hunchiar Mosque

== Architecture ==
The city centre is a mixture of medieval, neoclassical, Art Deco, and Art Nouveau buildings, as well as 'neo-Romanian' buildings dating from the beginning of the 20th century and a collection of modern buildings from the 1920s and 1930s. The mostly utilitarian Communist-era architecture dominates most southern boroughs. Recently built contemporary structures such as skyscrapers and office buildings complete the landscape.

=== Historical architecture ===
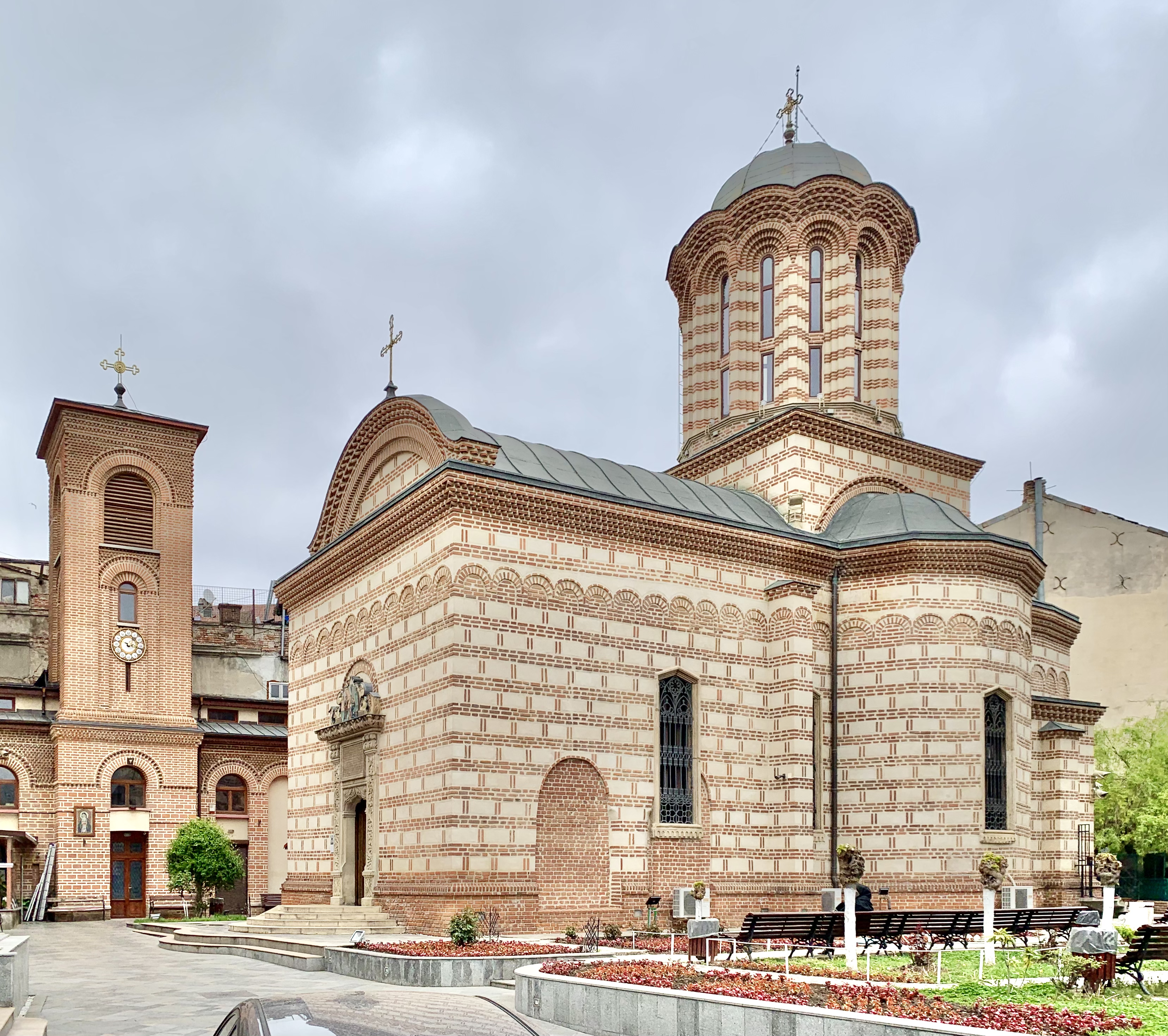
Curtea Veche Church

Of the city's medieval architecture, most of what survived into modern times was destroyed by communist systematization, fire, and military incursions. Some medieval and renaissance edifices remain, the most notable are in the Lipscani area. This precinct contains notable buildings such as Manuc's Inn (Hanul lui Manuc) and the ruins of the Old Court (Curtea Veche); during the late Middle Ages, this area was the heart of commerce in Bucharest. From the 1970s onwards, the area went through urban decline, and many historical buildings fell into disrepair. In 2005, the Lipscani area was restored.

To execute a massive redevelopment project during the rule of Nicolae Ceaușescu, the government conducted extensive demolition of churches and many other historic structures in Romania. According to Alexandru Budișteanu, former chief architect of Bucharest, "The sight of a church bothered Ceaușescu. It didn't matter if they demolished or moved it, as long as it was no longer in sight". Nevertheless, a project organised by Romanian engineer Eugeniu Iordăchescu was able to move many historic structures to less-prominent sites and save them.

The city centre has retained architecture from the late 19th and early 20th centuries, particularly the interwar period, which is often seen as the 'golden age' of Bucharest architecture. During this time, the city grew in size and wealth, therefore seeking to emulate other large European capitals such as Paris. Much of the architecture of the time belongs to a Modern (rationalist) Architecture current, led by Horia Creangă and Marcel Iancu.

In Romania, the tendencies of innovation in the architectural language met the need of valorisation and affirmation of the national cultural identity. The Art Nouveau movement found expression through new architectural style initiated by Ion Mincu and taken over by other prestigious architects who capitalised important references of Romanian laic and medieval ecclesiastical architecture (for example the Mogoșoaia Palace, the Stavropoleos Church or the disappeared church of Văcărești Monastery) and Romanian folk motifs. The Romanian Revival architecture, which was born as the result of the attempts of finding a specific Romanian architectural style, is exemplified though buildings such as Nicolae Minovici Folk Art Museum and the Romanian Peasant Museum.

Another style of the 1930s is the Moorish-Florentine or Mediterranean Picturesque, which eclectically uses Romanesque, Gothic and Renaissance elements in civic architecture, with Mediterranean elements, giving rise to Mediterranean Revival architecture.

Some buildings from the interwar era have a modernist brutalist look, such as the Tehnoimport Building, which was built in 1935, and may be mistaken as communist architecture. Modernist styles during the interwar period include Art Deco, Stripped Classicism, Bauhaus and Rationalism.

Two buildings from this time are the Crețulescu Palace, housing cultural institutions including UNESCO's European Centre for Higher Education, and the Cotroceni Palace, the residence of the Romanian President. Many large-scale constructions such as the Gara de Nord, the busiest railway station in the city, National Bank of Romania's headquarters, and the Telephones Company Building date from these times. In the 2000s, some historic buildings in the city centre underwent restoration. In some residential areas of the city, particularly in high-income central and northern districts, turn-of-the-20th-century villas were mostly restored beginning in the late 1990s.

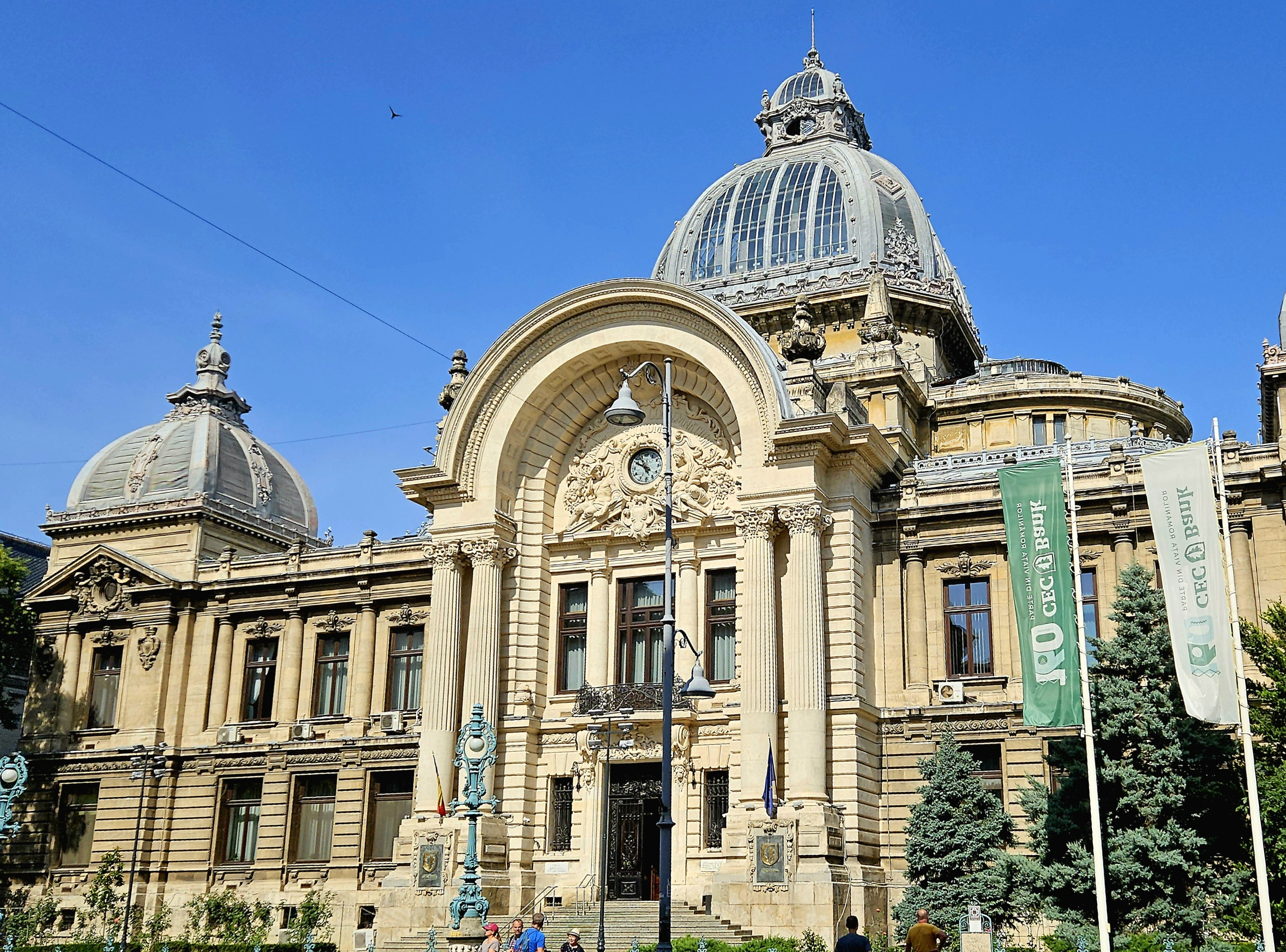
CEC Palace

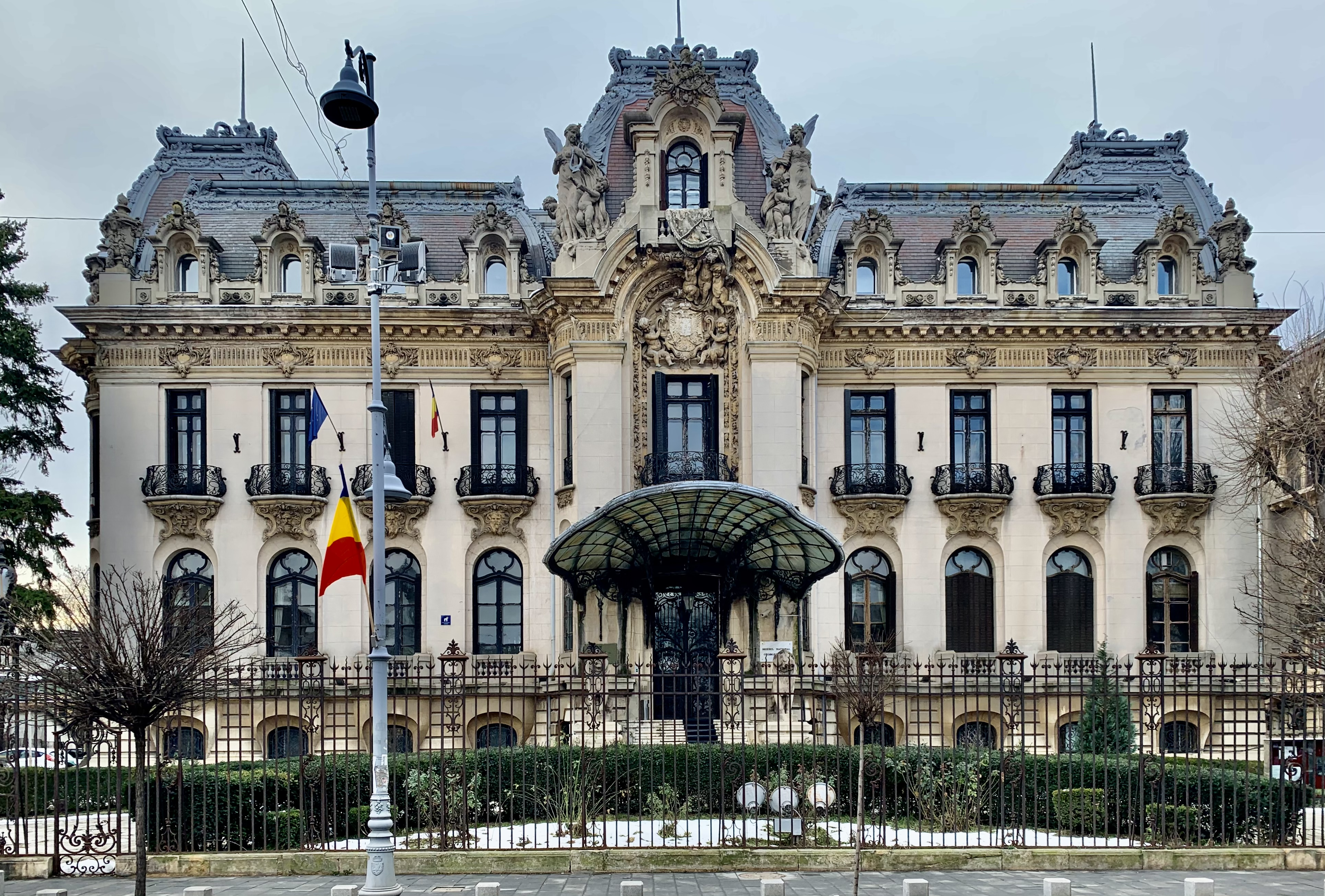
Cantacuzino Palace

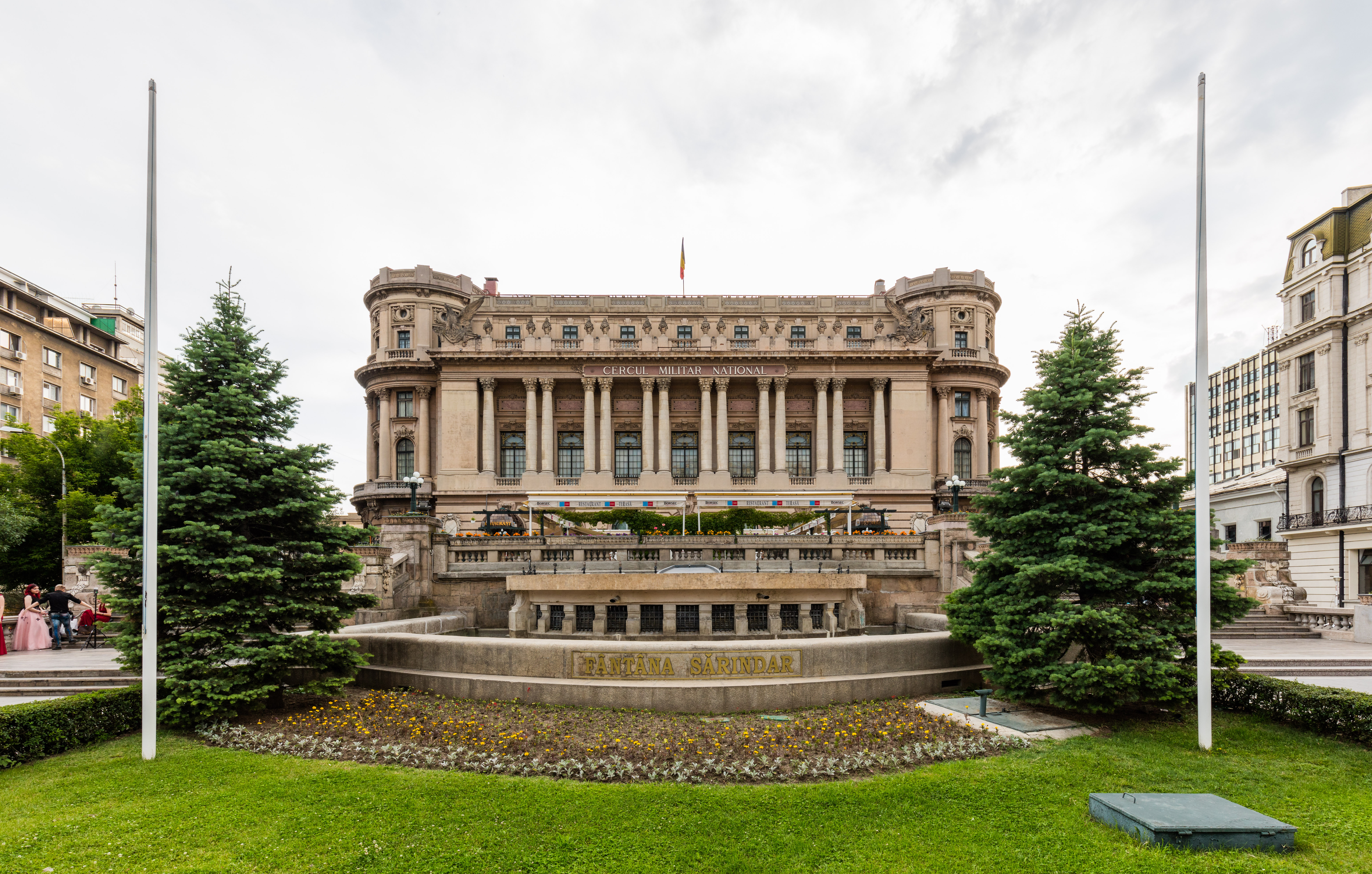
Palace of the National Military Circle

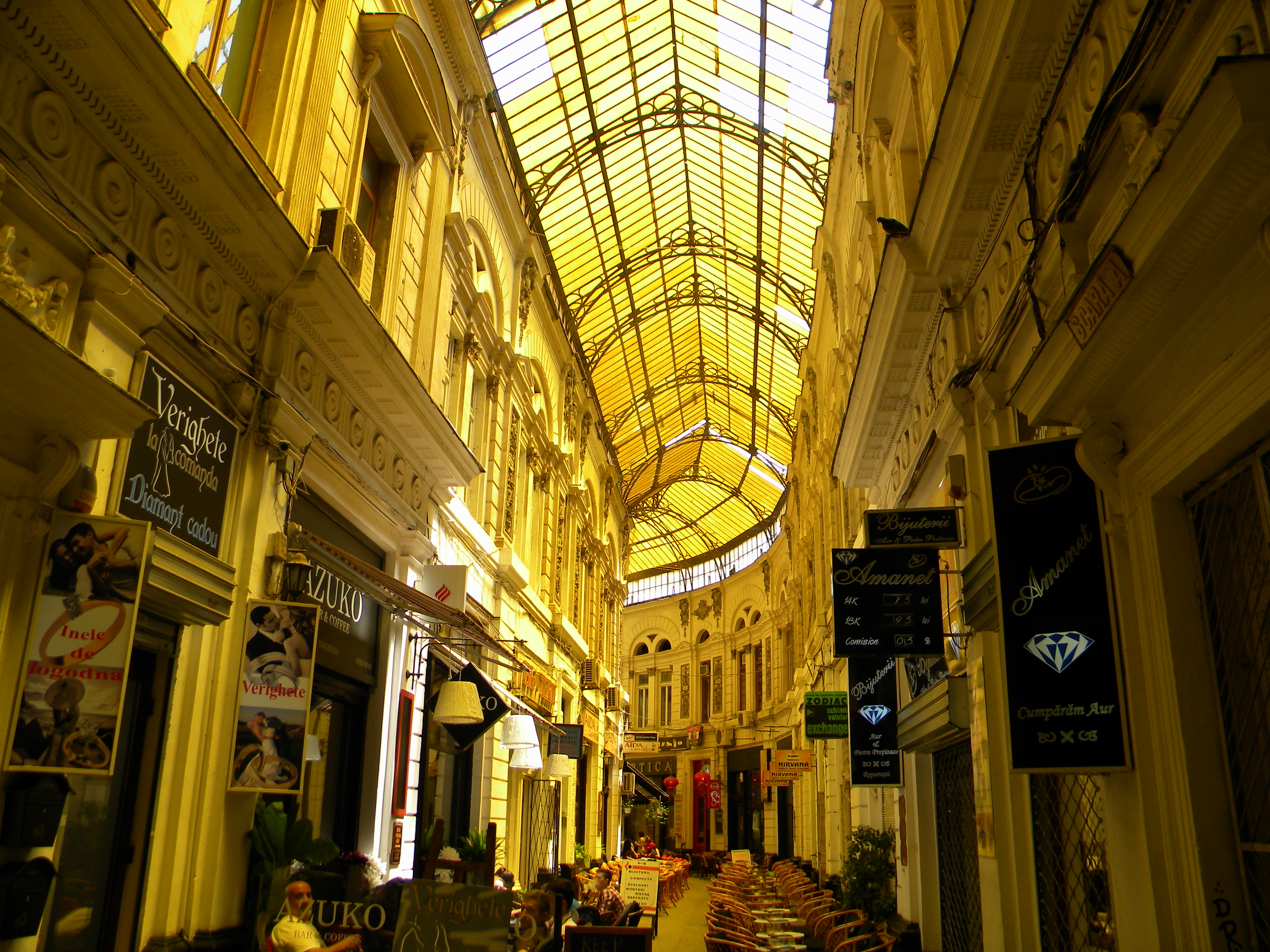
Macca Villacrosse Passage

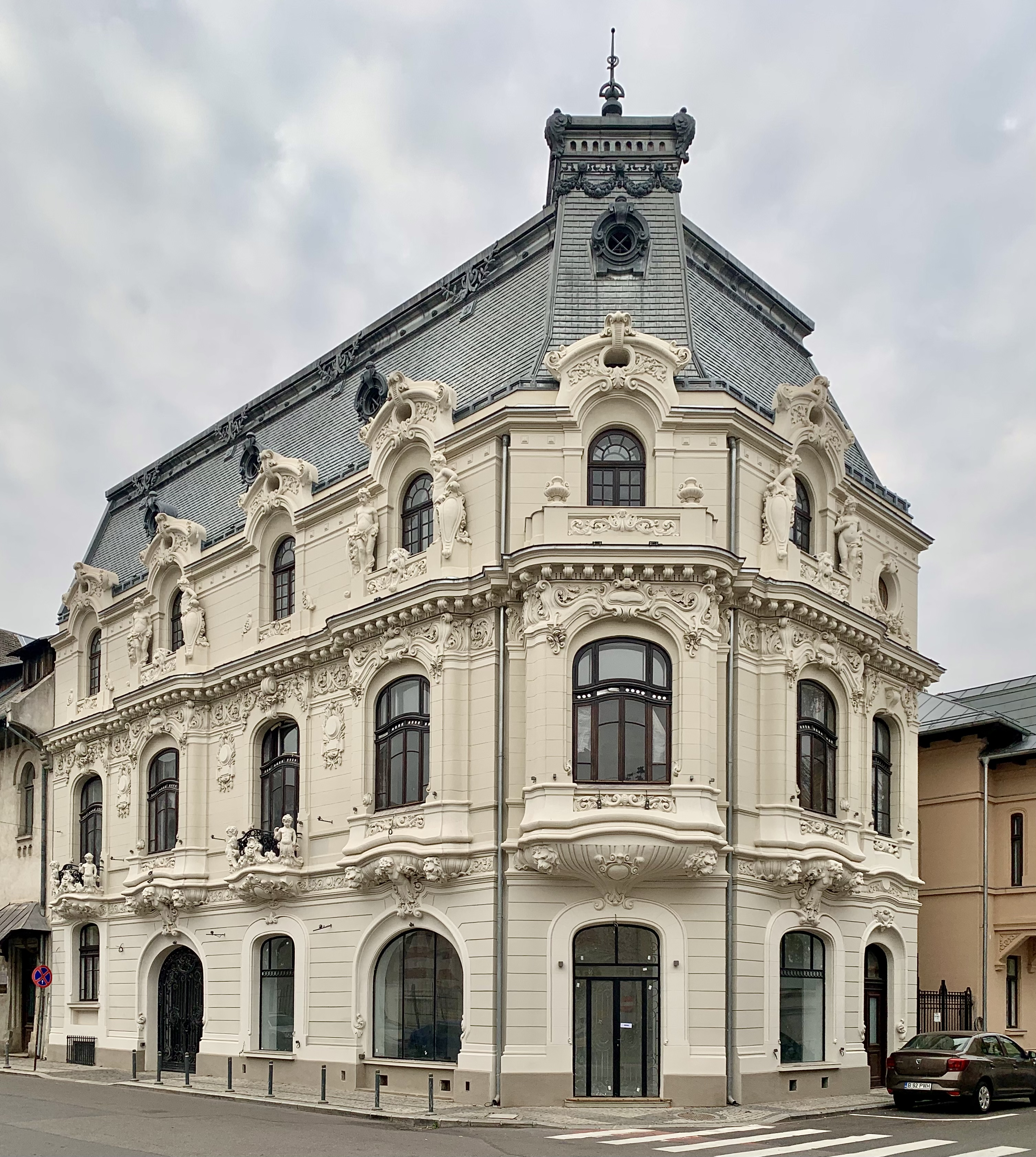
Mița Biciclista House, an example of Beaux-Arts architecture

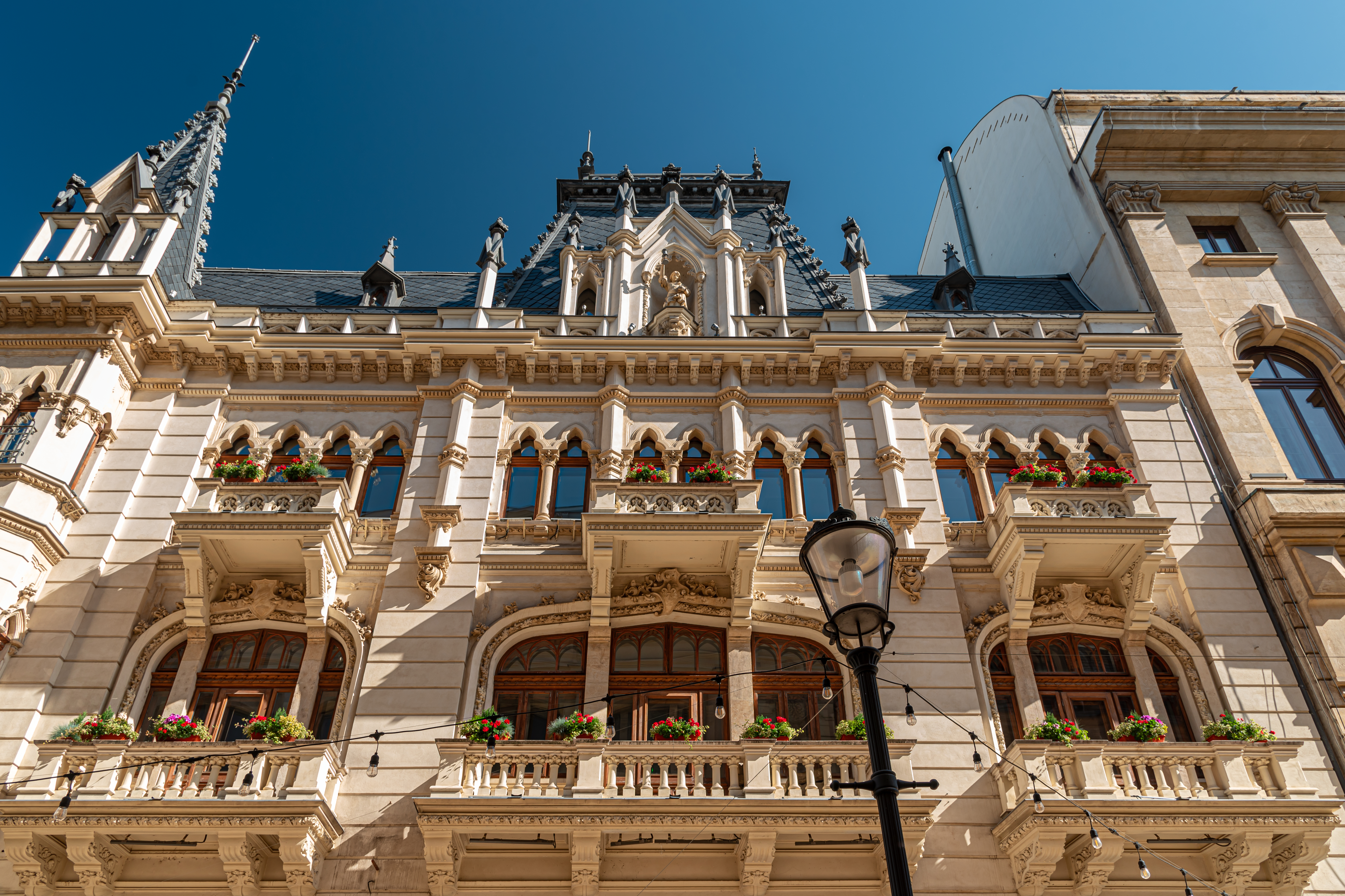
Caru' cu bere, an example of Gothic Revival architecture

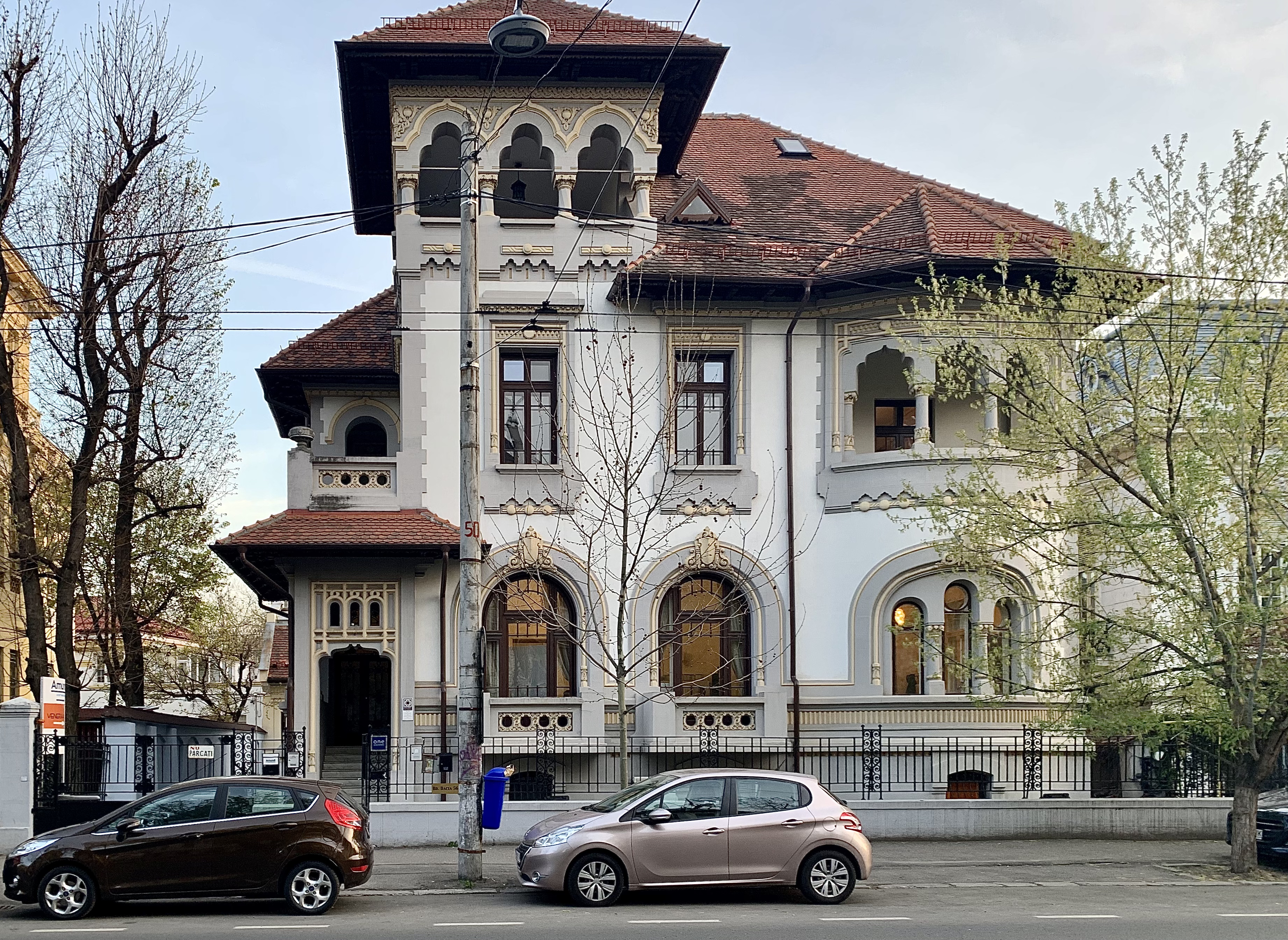
Romanian Revival architecture (C.N. Câmpeanu/Alfred E. Gheorghiu House on Bulevardul Dacia)

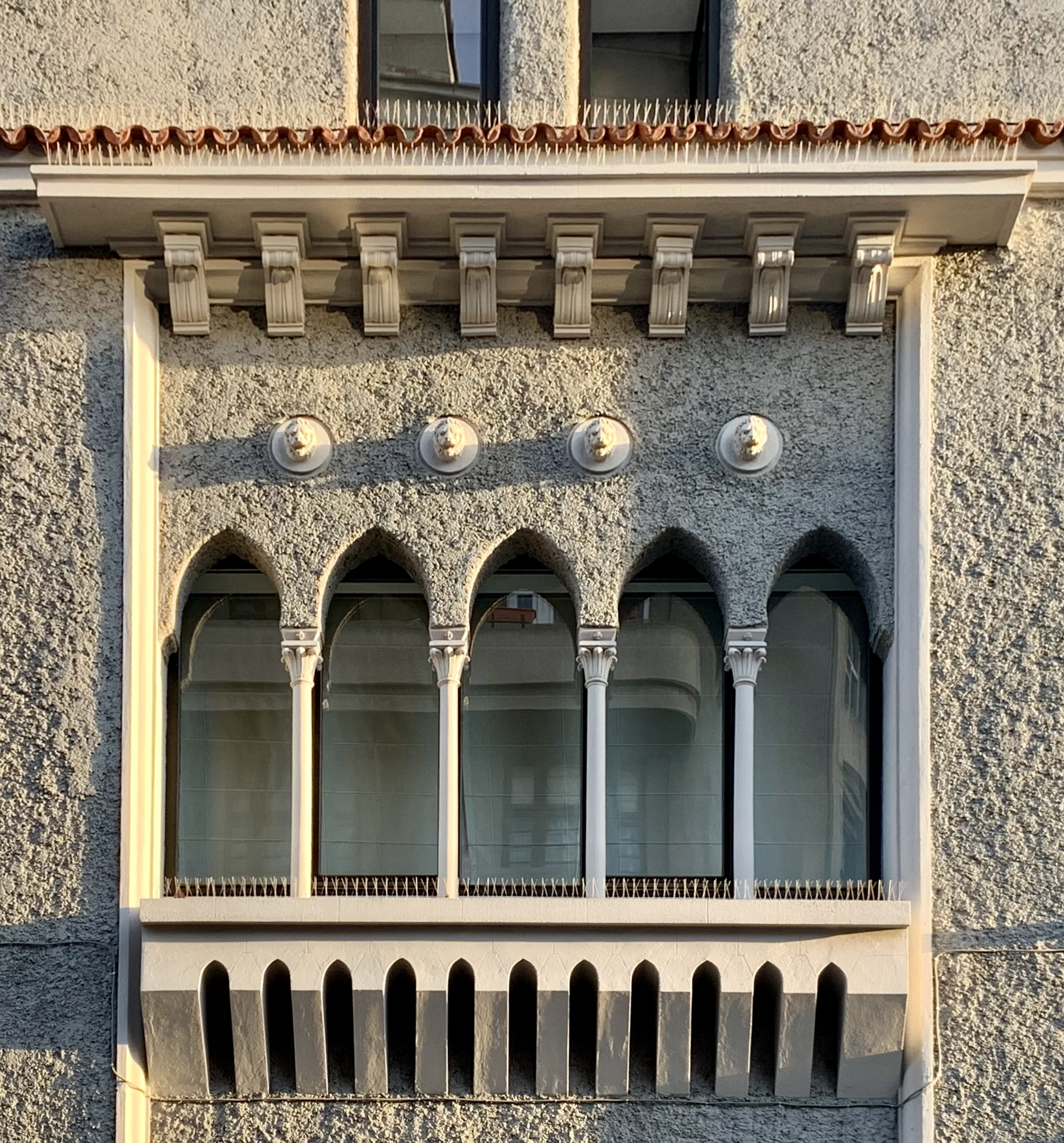
Window design on George Enescu street no. 14, an example of Mediterranean Revival architecture

The Telephones Company Building, an example of the Art Deco style

=== Communist era architecture ===
A major part of Bucharest's architecture is made up of buildings constructed during the Communist era replacing the historical architecture with high-density apartment blocks – significant portions of the historic centre of Bucharest were demolished to construct one of the largest buildings in the world, the Palace of the Parliament (then officially called the House of the Republic). In Nicolae Ceaușescu's project of systematization, new buildings were built in previously historical areas, which were razed and then built upon.

Communist architecture broadly includes three stages: architecture that was built in the early years of communism, in the late 1940s and 1950s, which followed the Soviet Stalinist trend of Socialist Realism, an example being the House of the Free Press (which was named Casa Scînteii during communism); postwar Modernism in the 1960s and the 1970s; and the systematization program of the late 1970s and 1980s, which included mass demolitions of historical buildings and their replacement with North Korean influenced buildings after Nicolae Ceaușescu visited East Asia in 1971, and was impressed by its Juche ideology.

The Communist regime installed after World War II took control over all aspects of life, including architecture, dictating a uniform bureaucratic vision of urbanism and architectural design. Gheorghe Gheorghiu-Dej, who was premier of the Socialist Republic of Romania from 1947 until 1965, began the country's policies of industrialization, with infrastructure development for heavy industry, and construction for mass resettlement to new industrial and agricultural centres away from Bucharest and other principal cities. The architecture from this period is more or less easy to spot, by its use of Neoclassical elements and proportions, but in a simplified way. There are also some small 3–4 floors "Russian blocks" from this era, some of them built of red bricks.

Communist-era architecture from the 1960s and 1970s can be found especially in Bucharest's residential districts, mainly in blocuri, which are high-density apartment blocks that house the majority of the city's population. Initially, these apartment blocks started to be constructed in the 1960s, on relatively empty areas and fields (good examples include Pajura, Drumul Taberei, Berceni and Titan), however with the 1970s, they mostly targeted peripheral neighbourhoods such as Colentina, Pantelimon, Militari and Rahova. Construction of these apartment blocks were also often randomised, for instance some small streets were demolished and later widened with the blocks being built next to them, but other neighbouring streets were left intact (like in the example of Calea Moșilor from 1978 to 1982), or built in various patterns such as the Piața Iancului-Lizeanu apartment buildings from 1962 to 1963.

The last years of communism were marked by major urban redevelopment schemes which changed dramatically the face of many cities, including Bucharest. One of the most singular examples of late stage communist architecture of the 1980s is Centrul Civic, a development that replaced a major part of Bucharest's historic city centre with giant utilitarian buildings, mainly with marble or travertine façades, inspired by North Korean architecture. The mass demolitions that occurred in the 1980s, under which an overall area of eight square kilometres of the historic centre of Bucharest were levelled, including monasteries, churches, synagogues, a hospital, and a noted Art Deco sports stadium, changed drastically the appearance of the city.

The Palace of the Parliament (Romanian: Palatul Parlamentului, formerly and alternatively still known as Casa Poporului) is one of the largest buildings in the world

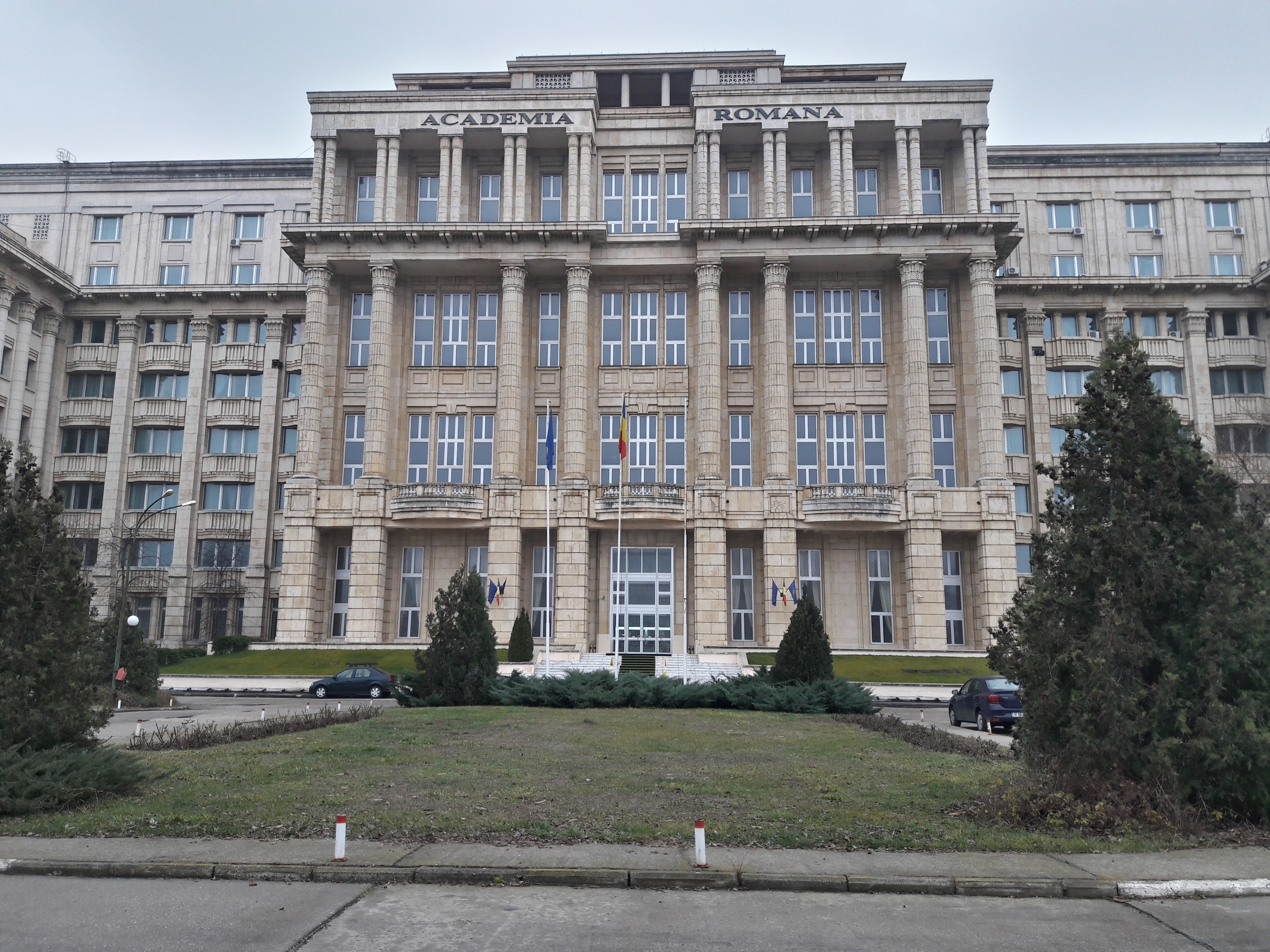
Romanian Academy's building

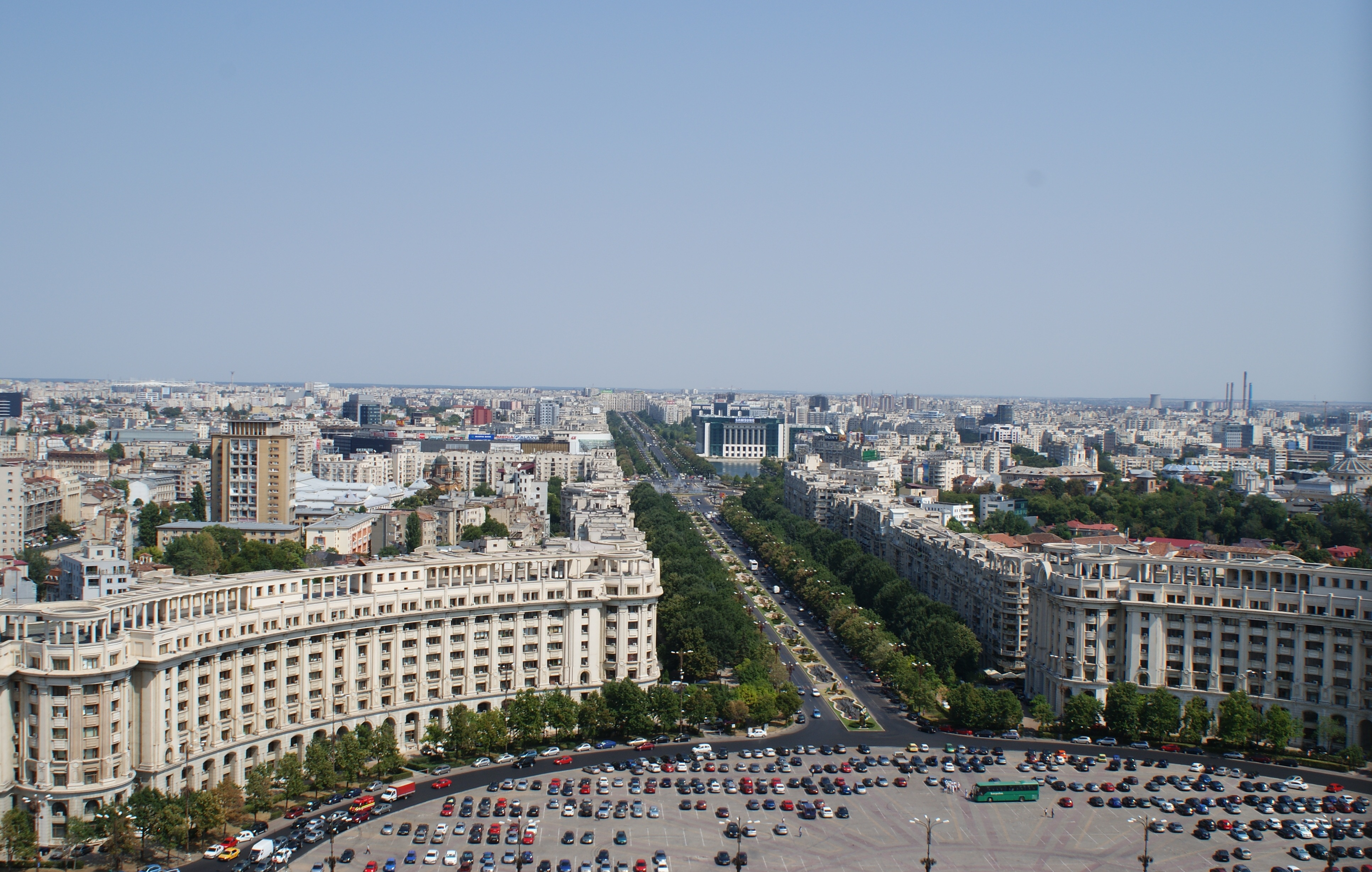
Centrul Civic

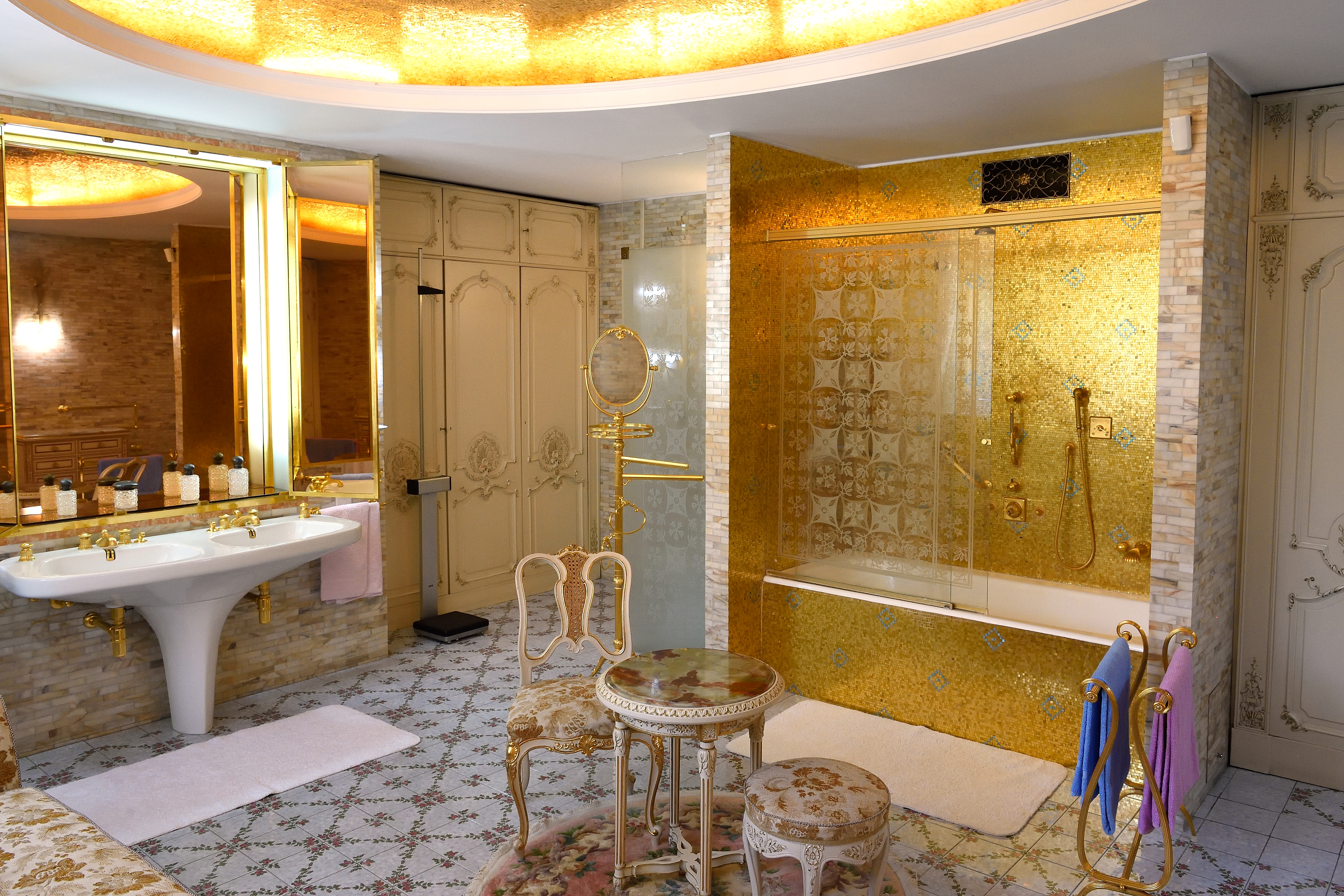
Nicolae Ceaușescu's residence is available to visitors.

The House of the Free Press, formerly Casa Scînteii "I. V. Stalin". It was built in the 1950s and it is an example of Stalinist architecture from the early communist period.

=== Contemporary architecture ===
Since the fall of communism in 1989, several communist-era buildings have been refurbished, modernised, and used for other purposes. Perhaps the best example of this is the conversion of obsolete retail complexes into shopping malls and commercial centres. These giant, circular halls, which were unofficially called hunger circuses due to the food shortages experienced in the 1980s, were constructed during the Ceaușescu era to act as produce markets and refectories, although most were left unfinished at the time of the revolution.

Modern shopping malls such as the Unirea Shopping Centre, Bucharest Mall, Plaza Romania, and City Mall emerged on pre-existent structures of former hunger circuses. Another example is the conversion of a large utilitarian construction in Centrul Civic into a Marriott Hotel. This process was accelerated after 2000, when the city underwent a property boom, and many communist-era buildings in the city centre became prime real estate due to their location. Many communist-era apartment blocks have also been refurbished to improve urban appearance.

The newest contribution to Bucharest's architecture took place after the fall of communism, particularly after 2000, when the city went through a period of urban renewal – and architectural revitalization – on the back of Romania's economic growth. Buildings from this time are mostly made of glass and steel, and often have more than 10 stories. Examples include shopping malls (particularly the Bucharest Mall, a conversion and extension of an abandoned building), office buildings, bank headquarters, etc.

During the 21st century, several high rise office buildings were built, particularly in the northern and eastern parts of the city. Additionally, a trend to add modern wings and façades to historic buildings has occurred, the most prominent example of which is the Bucharest Architects' Association Building, which is a modern glass-and-steel construction built inside a historic stone façade. In 2013, the Bucharest skyline enriched with a 137-m-high office building (SkyTower of Floreasca City Centre), the tallest building in Romania. Examples of modern skyscrapers built in the 21st century include Bucharest Tower Centre, Euro Tower, Nusco Tower, Cathedral Plaza, City Gate Towers, Rin Grand Hotel, Premium Plaza, Bucharest Corporate Centre, Millennium Business Centre, PGV Tower, Charles de Gaulle Plaza, Business Development Centre Bucharest, BRD Tower, and Bucharest Financial Plaza. Despite this vertical development, Romanian architects avoid designing very tall buildings due to vulnerability to earthquakes.

Aside from buildings used for business and institutions, residential developments have also been built, many of which consist of high-rise office buildings and suburban residential communities. An example of a new high rise residential complex is Asmita Gardens. These developments are increasingly prominent in northern Bucharest, which is less densely populated and is home to middle- and upper-class Bucharesters due to the process of gentrification.

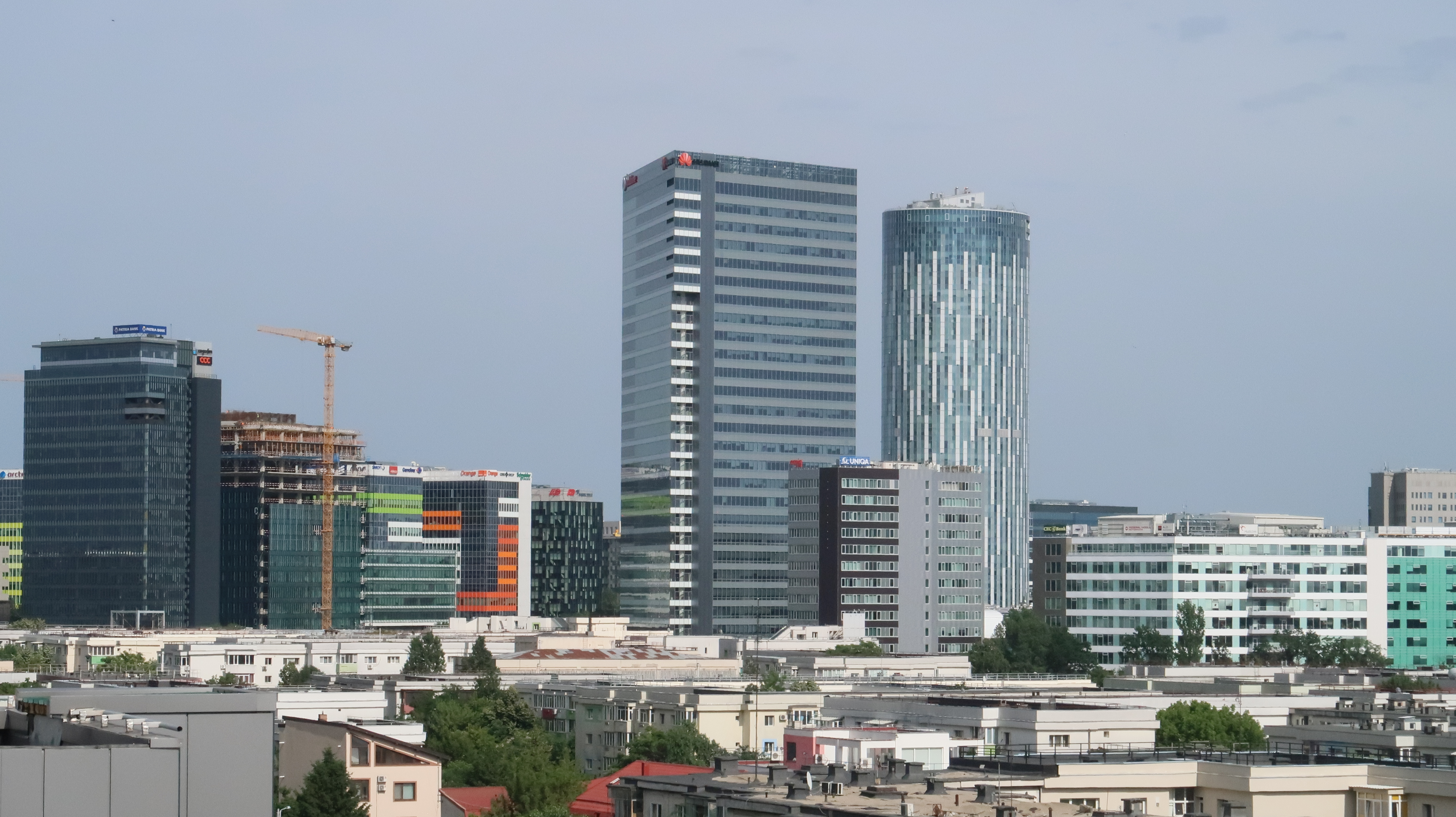
Pipera Sky Tower

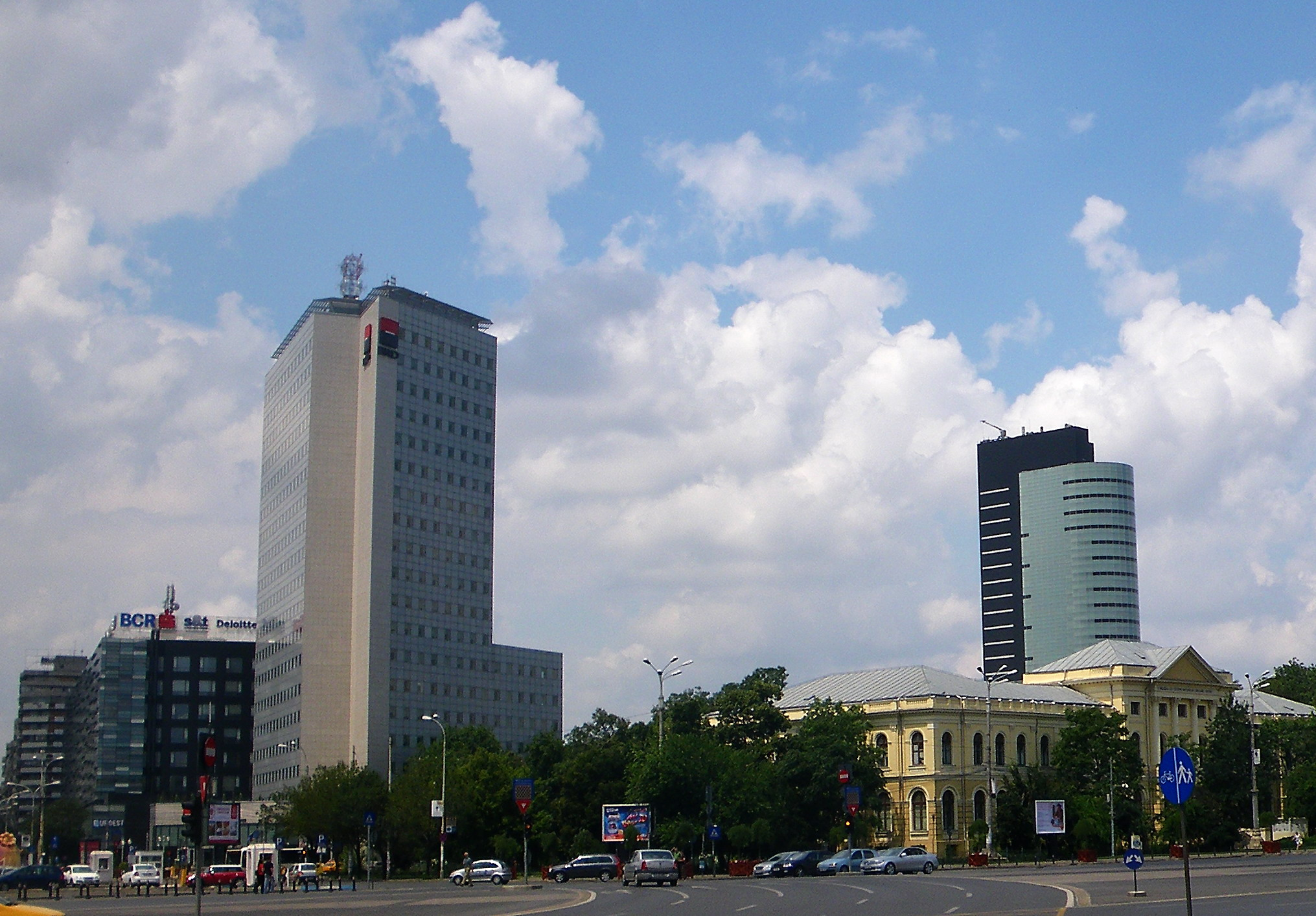
BRD Tower and Bucharest Tower Center in Victory Square

City Gate Towers office buildings

Asmita Gardens

The World Trade Center in Bucharest

Bucharest Financial Plaza

== Education ==
Overall, 159 faculties are in 34 universities. Sixteen public universities are in Bucharest, the largest of which are the University of Bucharest, the Politehnica University of Bucharest, the Bucharest University of Economic Studies, the Carol Davila University of Medicine and Pharmacy, Technical University of Civil Engineering, the National University of Political Studies and Public Administration, and the University of Agronomic Sciences and Veterinary Medicine of Bucharest.

These are supplemented by nineteen private universities, such as the Romanian-American University. Private universities, however, have a mixed reputation due to irregularities.

In the 2020 QS World University Rankings, from Bucharest, only the University of Bucharest was included in the top universities of the world. The Politehnica University disappeared from the ranking. Also, in recent years, the city has had increasing numbers of foreign students enrolling in its universities.

The first modern educational institution was the Princely Academy from Bucharest, founded in 1694 and divided in 1864 to form the present-day University of Bucharest and the Saint Sava National College, both of which are among the most prestigious of their kind in Romania.

Over 450 public primary and secondary schools are in the city, all of which are administered by the Bucharest Municipal Schooling Inspectorate. Each sector also has its own Schooling Inspectorate, subordinated to the municipal one.

Bucharest is also home to many scientific sections of the Romanian Academy.

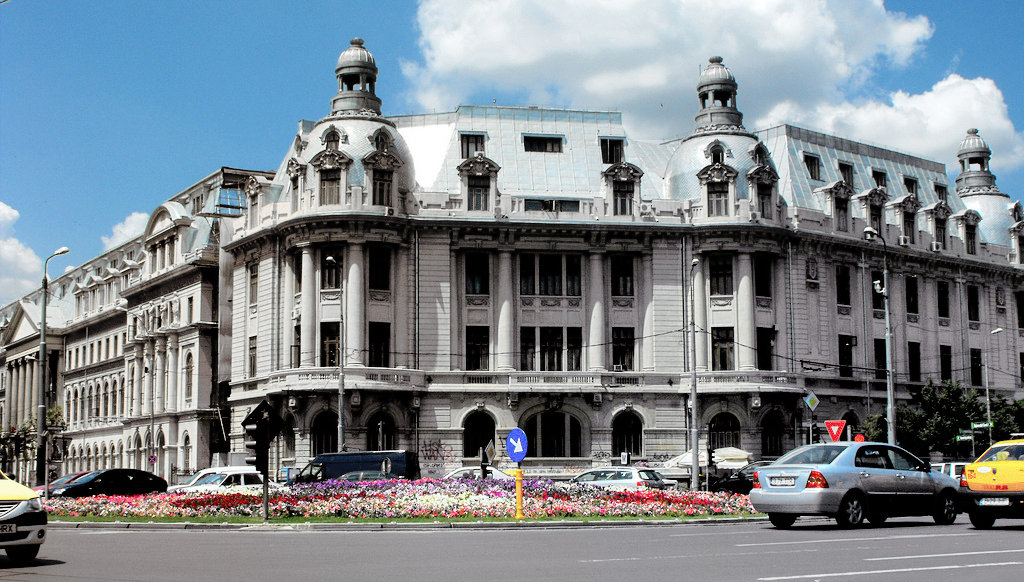
University of Bucharest (UB)

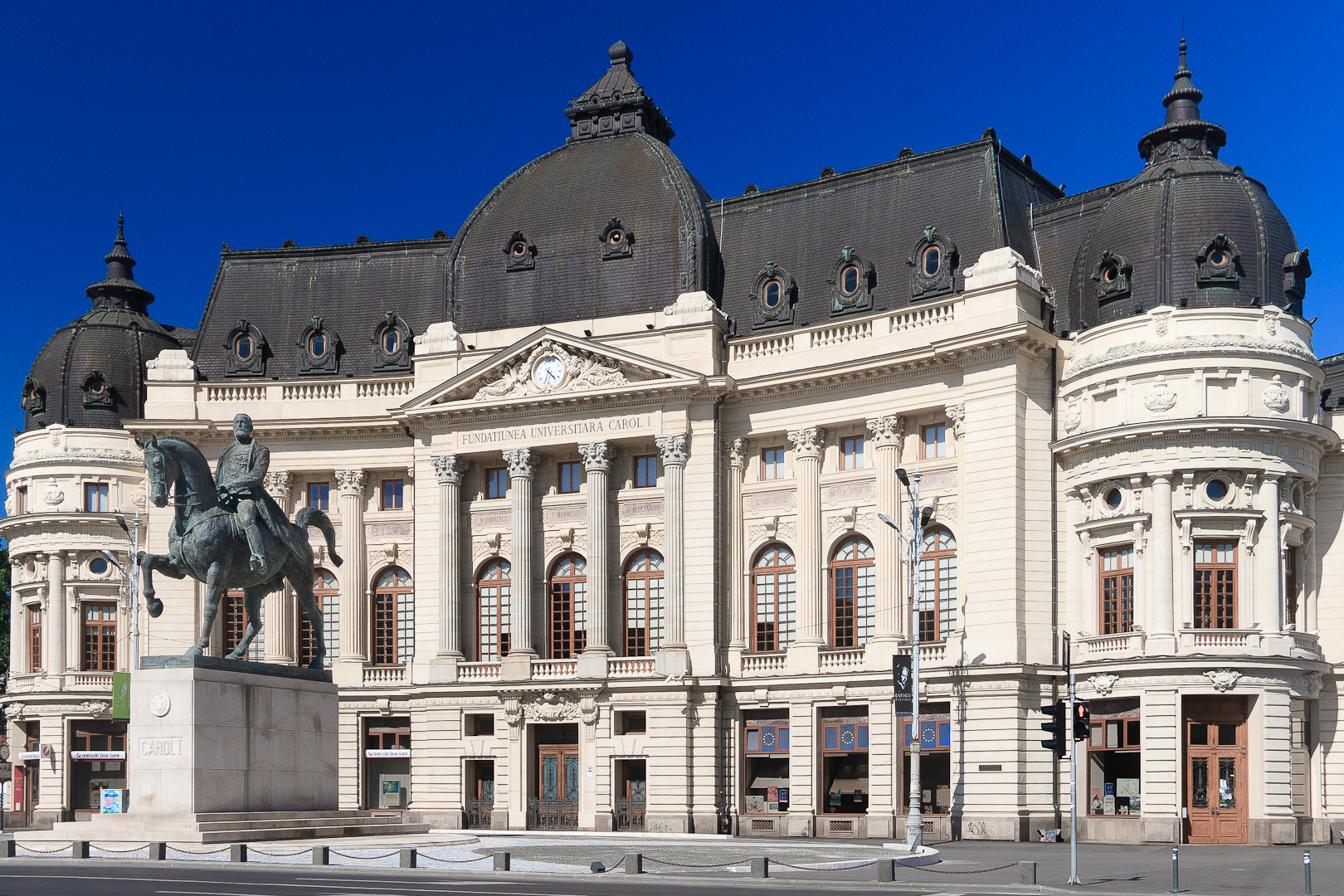
Central University Library

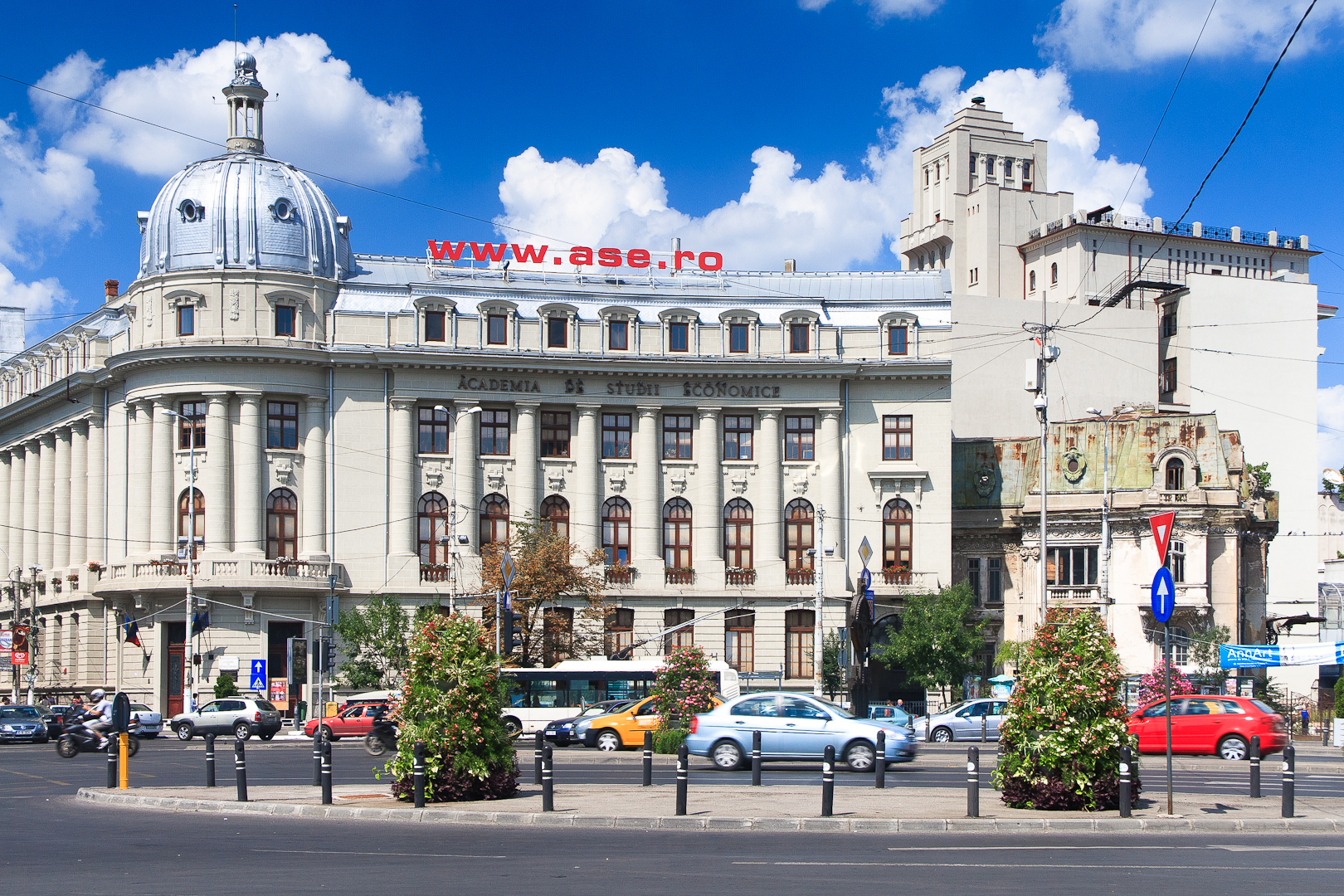
Bucharest Academy of Economic Studies (ASE)

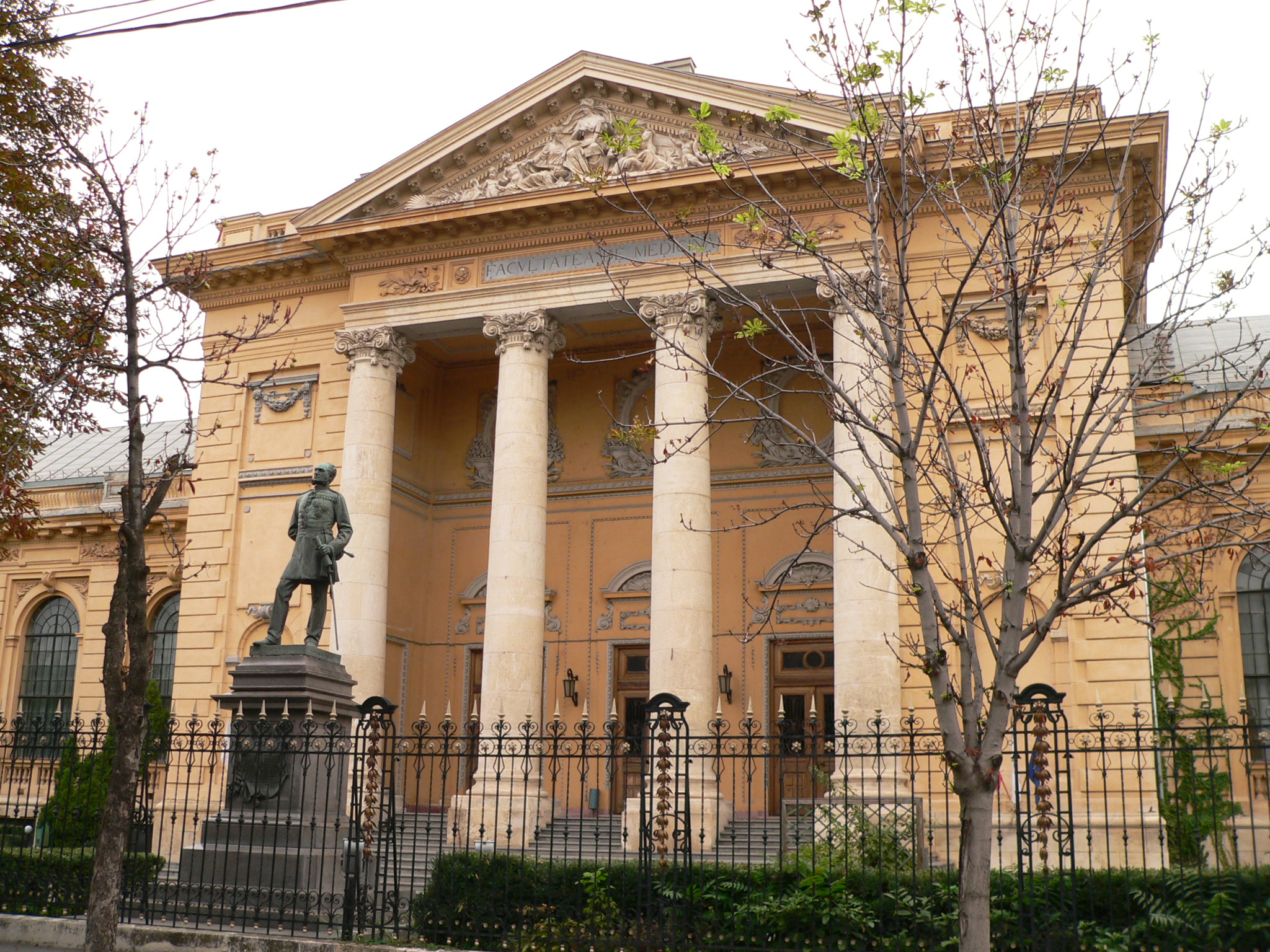
University of Medicine and Pharmacy (UMFCD)

== Media ==
The city is well-served by a modern landline and mobile network. Offices of Poșta Română, the national postal operator, are spread throughout the city, with the central post office (Romanian: Oficiul Poștal București 1) located at 12 Matei Millo Street. Public telephones are located in many places and are operated by Telekom Romania, a subsidiary of Deutsche Telekom and successor of the former monopoly Romtelecom.

Bucharest is the headquarters of most national television networks and national newspapers, radio stations and online news websites. The largest daily newspapers in Bucharest include Evenimentul Zilei, Jurnalul Național, Cotidianul, România Liberă, and Adevărul, while the biggest news websites are HotNews (with English and Spanish versions), Ziare.com, and Gândul. During the rush hours, tabloid newspapers Click!, Libertatea, and Cancan are popular for commuters.

Several newspapers and media publications are based in House of the Free Press (Casa Presei Libere), a landmark of northern Bucharest, originally named Casa Scânteii after the Communist Romania-era official newspaper Scînteia. The House of the Free Press is not the only Bucharest landmark that grew out of the media and communications industry. Palatul Telefoanelor ("The Telephone Palace") was the first major modernist building on Calea Victoriei in the city's centre, and the massive, unfinished communist-era Casa Radio looms over a park a block away from the Opera.

English-language newspapers became available in the early 1930s and reappeared in the 1990s. The two daily English-language newspapers are the Bucharest Daily News and Nine O' Clock; several magazines and publications in other languages are available, such as the Hungarian-language daily Új Magyar Szó.

Observator Cultural covers the city's arts, and the free weekly magazines Șapte Seri ("Seven Evenings") and B24FUN, list entertainment events. The city is home to the intellectual journal Dilema veche and the satire magazine Academia Cațavencu.

Visit Bucharest Today is another online platform promoting Bucharest as a tourist destination. It serves as a comprehensive resource for local and international travelers seeking to learn about the capital city of Romania. The online platform showcases Bucharest's rich history, cultural landmarks, hidden gems, and exciting experiences.

== Healthcare ==
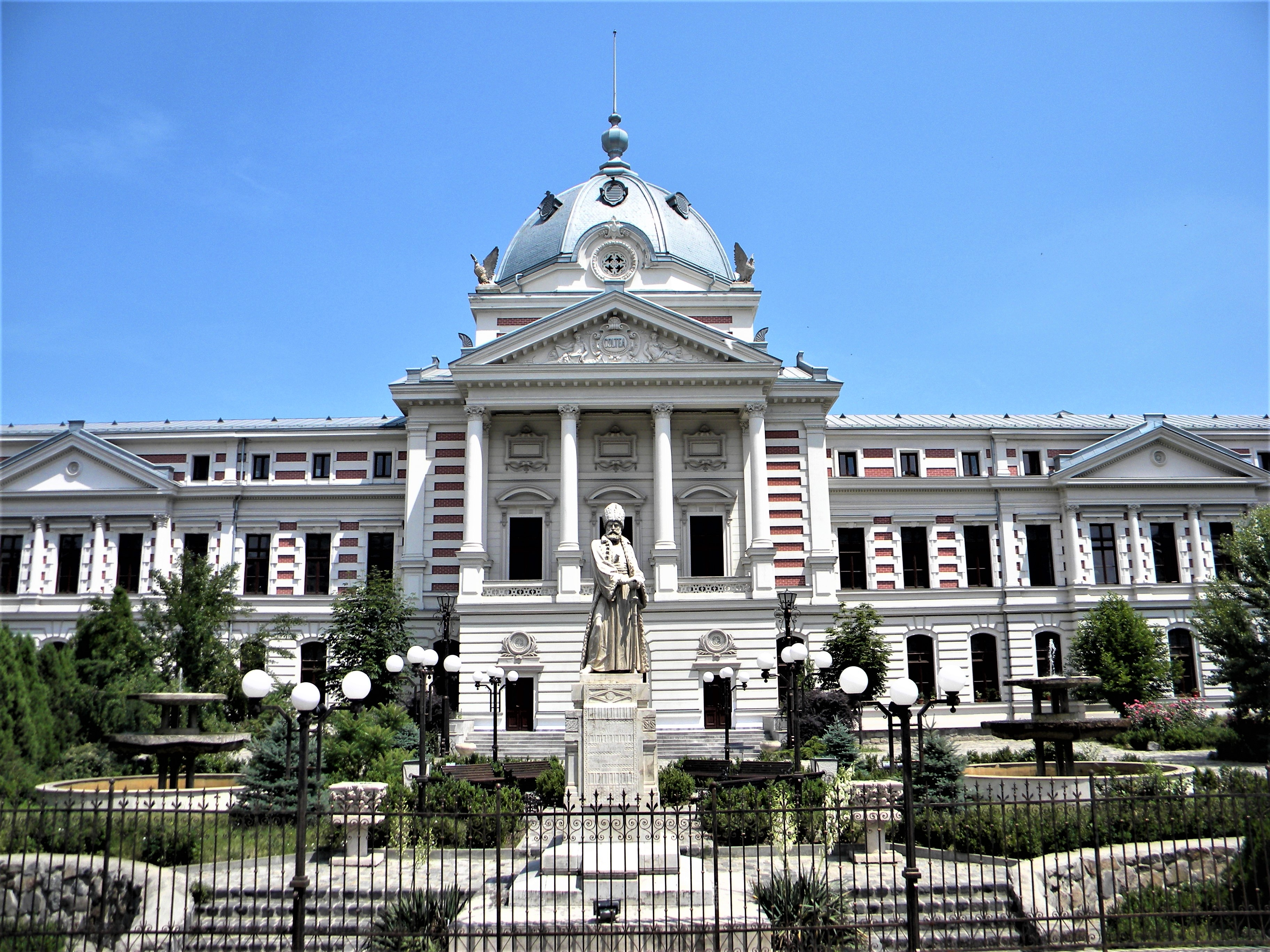
Colțea Hospital in 2018

One of the most modern hospitals in the capital is Colțea that has been re-equipped after a 90-million-euro investment in 2011. It specialises in oncological and cardiac disorders. It was built by Mihai Cantacuzino between 1701 and 1703, composed of many buildings, each with 12 to 30 beds, a church, three chapels, a school, and doctors' and teachers' houses.

Another conventional hospital is Pantelimon, which was established in 1733 by Grigore II Ghica. The surface area of the hospital land property was 400,000 m^{2} (4,305,564 sq ft). The hospital had in its inventory a house for infectious diseases and a house for persons with disabilities.

Other hospitals or clinics are Bucharest Emergency Hospital, Floreasca Emergency Clinic Hospital, Bucharest University Emergency Hospital, and Fundeni Clinical Institute or Biomedica International and Euroclinic, which are private.

== Sports ==
Football is the most widely followed sport in Bucharest, with the city having numerous club teams, including, most notably, Steaua București, Dinamo București, Rapid București and FCSB.

Arena Națională, a new stadium inaugurated on 6 September 2011, hosted the 2012 Europa League Final and has a 55,600-seat capacity, making it one of the largest stadiums in Southeastern Europe and one of the few with a roof.

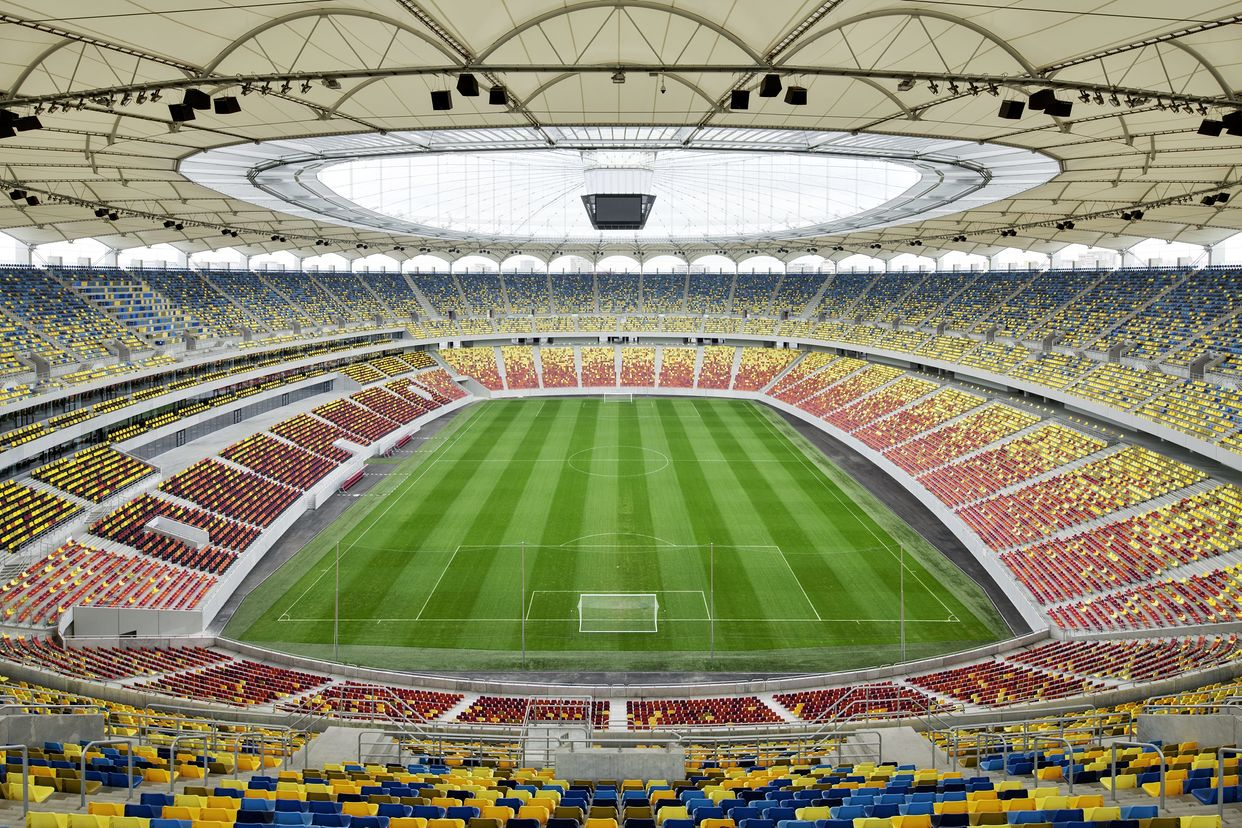
Arena Națională hosted the 2012 UEFA Europa League final and UEFA Euro 2020 matches.

Sport clubs have formed for handball, water polo, volleyball, rugby union, basketball and ice hockey. The majority of Romanian track and field athletes and most gymnasts are affiliated with clubs in Bucharest. The largest indoor arena in Bucharest is the Romexpo Dome with a seating capacity of 40,000. It can be used for boxing, kickboxing, handball and tennis.

Bucharest hosted annual races along a temporary urban track surrounding the Palace of the Parliament, called Bucharest Ring. The Bucharest City Challenge race hosted FIA GT, FIA GT3, British F3, and Logan Cup races. Since 2009, Bucharest has the largest Ferrari Shop in Eastern Europe and the 2nd largest in Europe after Milan shop.

The capital also hosted the international tennis tournaments WTA Bucharest Open and ATP Romanian Open. Ice hockey games are held at the Mihai Flamaropol Arena, which holds 8,000 spectators. Rugby games are held in different locations, but the most modern stadium is Arcul de Triumf Stadium, which is also home to the Romanian national rugby team.

Bucharest hosted the UEFA Euro 2020 championship at the Arena Națională or Bucharest National Arena. The championship took place in 2021, being postponed due to the outbreak of the COVID-19 pandemic.

== Twin towns – sister cities ==
Bucharest is twinned with:

- Amman, Jordan
- Ankara, Turkey
- Athens, Greece
- Athens, Georgia, United States
- Beijing, China
- Chișinău, Moldova
- Damascus, Syria
- Kyiv, Ukraine
- Lagos, Nigeria
- Moscow, Russia
- Nicosia, Cyprus
- Pretoria, South Africa
- Regina, Canada
- São Paulo, Brazil
- Sofia, Bulgaria
- (Georgia (country)) Tbilisi, Georgia

In addition, Bucharest has a partnership with:

- Yerevan, Armenia (2013)

== See also ==
- List of buildings in Bucharest
- List of people from Bucharest
- Counties of Romania
