= List of tallest buildings in Bucharest =

Bucharest, the capital of Romania, is the site of 100 completed high-rises, 6 of which stand taller than 100 metres (328 ft) and 58 of which stand taller than 60 metres (197 ft). The tallest skyscraper in the city and Romania is the SkyTower, which rises 137 m (449 ft) in Sector 1. The city has been the site of several construction projects that mostly consist of new office buildings, residential towers and hotel developments.

Bucharest's history of high-rises began with the 1932 completion of the 14-story Carlton Bloc. The 47 m (154 ft) structure was, at the time of its completion, the tallest building in the city; it remained the tallest in Bucharest until the 53 m (174 ft). Telephone Palace was completed in 1934. Bucharest underwent a major building boom during the communist regime which led to many systematization works. During this time, the House of the Free Press became the tallest building in the city; the 104 m (341 ft) structure was also the tallest building in Romania until 2007, when the Tower Center International was completed. The most recent high-rise construction project to be completed in Bucharest was the Ana Tower. The project consisted of a 25-story, 110 m (361 ft), office building. The building, located on the Bulevardul Poligrafiei was completed in 2019, becoming the 3rd-tallest building in the city.

As of June 2016, there are 25 buildings under construction in Bucharest that are planned to rise over 50 m (164 ft) in height. The largest construction projects in the city are the Orhideea Towers, The Bridge and the Globalworth Campus. The Orhideea Towers is an under-construction dual tower complex comprising one 17-floor 85 m (279 ft) tall building and one 13-floor 64 m (210 ft) tall building linked together by a skybridge. The project is expected to be delivered by 2017. The Bridge is another large project consisting of two 10 floor office buildings located next to the Orhideea towers. The largest and most important project in construction is the Globalworth Campus consisting of three office buildings, two of which have 12 floors and one 14 floors. The 105,000 m^{2} (1,130,211 sq ft) complex will be at completion, in 2017, the largest office building complex in Bucharest and Romania surpassing the 92,855 m^{2} (999,483 sq ft) Iride Business Park owned by Immofinanz. The original project of the Globalworth Campus included a fourth 25 floor building which was not included in the development.

== Tallest buildings ==
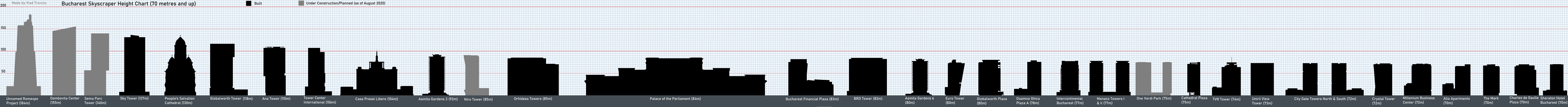
List of the tallest buildings in Bucharest, taller than 70 metres, under construction or finished
List of tallest buildings in Bucharest (black buildings are completed, gray ones are proposed or under construction)

This lists ranks Bucharest high-rises that stand at least 60 m (197 ft) tall, based on standard height measurement. This includes spires and architectural details but does not include antenna masts.

Rank	Name	Image	Height m (ft)	Floors	Year	Coordinates	Notes
1	SkyTower		137 (449)	37	2012	44°28′42″N 26°6′14″E	Tallest building in Bucharest and Romania since completion in 2012
2	Catedrala Mântuirii Neamului		130 (427)	N/A	2024	44°25′33.26″N 26°4′56.37″E	It is the tallest and largest Orthodox church in the world by volume and the second in the world by area.T/O in 2020
3	Globalworth Tower		118 (387)	27	2016	44°28′46″N 26°6′8″E	Second tallest building in Bucharest at completion in 2016
4	Ana Tower		110 (361)	25	2019	44°28′49″N 26°03′56.4″E	
5	Tower Center International		106.3 (349)	26	2008	44°27′16″N 26°4′52″E	Was the tallest building in Bucharest between 2007 and 2012
6	House of the Free Press		104 (341)	23	1956	44°28′51.36″N 26°4′16.35″E	Tallest building in Bucharest between 1956 and 2007
7	Asmita Gardens Tower 3		92.2 (302)	25	2009	44°24′23.7″N 26°7′28.2″E	Tallest residential building in Romania
8	Orhideea Towers		85 (279)	17	2017	44°26′38.4″N 26°3′35.3″E	Two towers, first 85 (279) high and second 64 (210) high
9	Palace of the Parliament		84 (276)	12	1997	44°25′39″N 26°5′15″E	Largest building in Romania
10	Bucharest Financial Plaza		83 (272)	18	1997	44°25′58″N 26°5′48″E	Headquarters of BCR Bank
11	BRD Tower		82 (269)	19	2003	44°27′9″N 26°5′1″E	Headquarters of BRD – Groupe Société Générale
12	Asmita Gardens Tower 6		80 (262)	20	2009	44°24′23.7″N 26°7′28.2″E	Second tallest residential building in Romania
12	Euro Tower		80 (262)	19	2010	44°27′25.5″N 26°6′23.9″E	The first green building in Bucharest
12	Globalworth Plaza	Nusco Tower, Bucharest	80 (262)	20	2010	44°28′49.6″N 26°6′13.9″E	Formerly known as Nusco Tower
15	Doamna Ghica Plaza A		78 (256)	24	2011	44°27′7″N 26°8′41.6″E	The complex has one 24 floor tower and four 16 floor towers
16	InterContinental Bucharest		77 (253)	25	1970	44°26′14″N 26°6′8″E	Tallest hotel in Romania
16	Monaco Towers I		76 (249)	20	2009	44°22′15.6″N 26°8′27.6″E	
16	Monaco Towers II		76 (249)	20	2009	44°22′15.6″N 26°8′27.6″E	
19	Cathedral Plaza		75 (246)	19	2011	44°26′32.6″N 26°5′31.1″E	The building might endanger the structural integrity of the nearby St. Joseph Cathedral
20	TVR Tower		74 (243)	13	1968	44°27′49.1″N 26°5′21″E	Headquarters of the Romanian National Television
21	Unirii View Tower		73 (240)	19	2018	44°25′51.7″N 26°06′34.3″E	
22	City Gate North Tower		72 (236)	18	2009	44°28′42.5″N 26°4′15.7″E	
22	City Gate South Tower		72 (236)	18	2009	44°28′39.3″N 26°4′17″E	
22	Crystal Tower		72 (236)	15	2011	44°27′9.4″N 26°5′43.5″E	The first private office building in Bucharest with a heliport and it serves as the headquarters of the Dutch banking group ING.
22	Millennium Business Center		72 (236)	19	2009	44°26′15.2″N 26°6′36.7″E	On June 27, 2009 the building went on fire after a big billboard exploded (probably) because it was struck by lightning
26	Alia Apartments		70 (230)	20	2010	44°27′51.1″N 26°4′23.8″E	
26	The Mark		70 (230)	15	2018	44°27′46.5″N 26°3′21.3″E	
26	Charles de Gaulle Plaza		70 (230)	16	2005	44°27′55.3″N 26°5′14.1″E	Has the fastest elevators in Romania having a speed of 2.5 m/s
26	Sheraton Bucharest Hotel		70 (230)	18	1976	44°26′48.2″N 26°5′56.6″E	Originally Hotel Dorobanți, then later on Howard Johnson Grand Plaza Hotel changed its name to Sheraton Bucharest on August 28, 2015
30	Blocul Sârbesc		69 (226)	18	1975	44°26′6″N 26°0′57.8″E	
30	Victoria Complex		69 (226)	18	2009	44°27′5.8″N 26°5′7.5″E	
30	Metropolis Residence		69 (226)	18	2008	44°28′35.1″N 26°02′48.7″E	
33	Business Development Center		68 (223)	17	2004		
33	Unicredit Tower		68 (223)	16	2012	44°28′39.4″N 26°4′6″E	Headquarters of the Italian UniCredit Bank
33	Doamna Ghica Plaza C		65 (213)	17	2011	44°27′7″N 26°8′41.6″E	The complex has one 24 floor tower and four 16 floor towers
35	Doamna Ghica Plaza E		65 (213)	17	2011	44°27′7″N 26°8′41.6″E	The complex has one 24 floor tower and four 16 floor towers
35	Doamna Ghica Plaza G		65 (213)	17	2011	44°27′7″N 26°8′41.6″E	The complex has one 24 floor tower and four 16 floor towers
35	Doamna Ghica Plaza I		65 (213)	17	2011	44°27′7″N 26°8′41.6″E	The complex has one 24 floor tower and four 16 floor towers
35	InCity Residences 1		65 (213)	17	2009	44°25′12.6″N 26°7′59.5″E	
35	InCity Residences 2		65 (213)	17	2009	44°25′12.6″N 26°7′59.5″E	
35	InCity Residences 3		65 (213)	17	2009	44°25′12.6″N 26°7′59.5″E	
35	InCity Residences 4		65 (213)	17	2009	44°25′12.6″N 26°7′59.5″E	
35	InCity Residences 5		65 (213)	17	2009	44°25′12.6″N 26°7′59.5″E	
35	PGV Tower		65 (213)	15	2006	44°24′29.2″N 26°5′45.9″E	
35	Rin Grand Hotel		65 (213)	15	2008	44°23′56.6″N 26°8′35.5″E	Was the largest hotel in Europe with 1,459 rooms but reduced to 489 rooms at present
35	Basarabia 96B		65 (213)	17	2008	44°24′23.7″N 26°7′28.2″E	
35	Bloc 9,Sala Palatului		65 (213)	17	1960	44°26′15″N 26°05′42.8″E	
47	Asmita Gardens Tower 1		64 (210)	20	2009	44°24′23.7″N 26°7′28.2″E	
47	Asmita Gardens Tower 2		64 (210)	20	2009	44°25′59.1″N 26°09′11.0″E	
47	Asmita Gardens Tower 4		64 (210)	20	2009	44°24′23.7″N 26°7′28.2″E	
47	Asmita Gardens Tower 5		64 (210)	20	2009	44°24′23.7″N 26°7′28.2″E	
47	Asmita Gardens Tower 7		64 (210)	20	2009	44°24′23.7″N 26°7′28.2″E	
47	Piraeus Bank Tower		64 (210)	15	2009	44°26′1.9″N 26°0′31.1″E	The Romanian headquarters of the Greek Piraeus Bank is located in this building.
47	Premium Plaza		64 (210)	15	2007	44°27′24.8″N 26°5′6.8″E	
47	Sema Parc Building Two		63 (207)	15	2008	44°26′43.7″N 26°2′43.8″E	
55	Iuliu Maniu at Virtuţii Block		62 (203)	16	1982	44°26′4.7″N 26°2′8″E	
55	Vitan Platinum Towers		62 (203)	16	2011	44°24′46″N 26°7′32″E	Only one out of the original four towers was built
57	T69 Tower (Bloc T69, Pantelimon)		61 (200)	19	1980	44°26′36″N 26°8′54.8″E	
58	Bucharest Corporate Center		60 (197)	15	2007	44°26′52.9″N 26°4′54.3″E	Headquarters of the Italian insurance company Assicurazioni Generali
58	Griro Tower		60 (197)	15	1984	44°27′43.3″N 26°3′22.6″E	

== Tallest under construction, proposed, and approved ==
=== Under construction ===
This lists buildings that are under construction in Bucharest and are planned to rise at least 60 m (197 ft). A floor count of 15 storeys is used as the cutoff for buildings whose heights have not yet been released by their developers.

Name	Image	Height m (ft)*	Floors	Year (est.)	Coordinates	Notes
Dâmbovița Center		155 (509)	34	Unknown	44°28′42″N 26°06′14″E	If completed, it would become the tallest building in Romania. Construction is currently on hold.
Niro Tower		85 (279)	23	2021	44°28′27″N 26°03′42″E	Hotel
@Expo		75 (246)	18	2022	44°28′26″N 26°04′00″E	1xGF+18, 1XGF+12,1XGF+7
One Verdi Park Office Tower		75 (246)	16	2021	44°28′09″N 26°06′36″E	Part of One Verdi development
One Verdi Park		75 (246)	20	2021	44°28′09″N 26°06′36″E	Part of One Verdi development
One Tower		65 (213)	16	2020	44°27′55″N 26°06′06″E	Part of One Mircea Eliade development. One office building GF+16, one residential building GF+20, two residential buildings GF+15
One Mircea Eliade Residential Tower 1		65 (213)	20	2020	44°27′55″N 26°06′06″E	Part of One Mircea Eliade development. One office building GF+16, one residential building GF+20, two residential buildings GF+15
Globalworth Square		65 (213)	16	2020	44°28′47″N 26°06′16″E	
Sema Parc – London Building		63 (207)	15	2021	44°26′45″N 26°02′30″E	Part of Sema Parc complex

=== Approved ===
This lists buildings that are approved in Bucharest and are planned to rise at least 60 (197). A floor count of 15 storeys is used as the cutoff for buildings whose heights have not yet been released by their developers.

Name	Height	Floors	Year (est.)	Notes
Sema Parc Tower	140 (459)	42	–	
Sema Parc Residential Tower 1	72 (236)	24	–	
Sema Parc Residential Tower 2	72 (236)	24	–	
Sema Parc Residential Tower 3	72 (236)	24	–	
Sema Parc Building Four	63 (207)	15	–	

=== Proposed ===
This lists buildings that are proposed in Bucharest and are planned to rise at least 30 m (98 ft). A floor count of 15 storeys is used as the cutoff for buildings whose heights have not yet been released by their developers.

Name	Height*	Floors	Year (est.)	Notes
UP-site Bucharest	–	24	–	
Iulian Dascalu Romexpo project	180 (591)	41	–	
Ion Tiriac IFMA project	80 (262)	–	2023	Demolition of old buildings on the premises started in 2020, including the demolition of Basarab Tower, a 114m elevator test tower.

* Table entries without text indicate that information regarding building heights has not yet been released.

== Timeline of tallest buildings ==
This lists buildings that once held the title of tallest building in Bucharest. The Turnul Colţei was the tallest structure in Bucharest from 1714 until 1888; because the bell tower was not a habitable building, it never stood as the tallest building in the city, but is included in this table for comparative purposes.

Name	Image	Location	Years as tallest	Height m (ft)	Floors	Coordinates	Ref.
Turnul Colței	Drawing of a tall tower with a clock and a tapering pyramidal roof; a status is located on top of the pointed roof	near today's University Square	1714–1888	50 (164)	2	44°26′6.54″N 26°6′10.72″E	
Foișorul de Foc	Ground-level view a tower with a circular cross section and a tapering spire	between Obor, Calea Moşilor and Traian streets	1890–1932	42 (138)	4	44°26′25.20″N 26°7′14.12″E	
Carlton Bloc^{[B]}	—	between Magheru and Regala streets	1932–1934	47 (154)	14	44°26′24.20″N 26°7′15.12″E	
Telephone Palace	Ground-level view of a 10-story building; the exterior has a tan hue with dark windows and a higher front side	Calea Victoriei	1934–1956	53 (174)	10	44°27′10.54″N 26°5′51.33″E	
House of the Free Press	Casa Scînteii on the reverse of a 100-lei banknote, 1952	Presei Libere Square	1956–2007	104 (341)	14	44°28′51.36″N 26°4′16.35″E	
Tower Center International		Victoria Square	2007–2012	120 (394)	26	44°27′16″N 26°04′52″E	
Floreasca City Center	tall buildings alongside road	Calea Floreasca	2012–present	137 (449)	37	44°28′42″N 26°06′13″E	

== See also ==
- List of tallest buildings in Romania
- List of tallest structures in Romania

== Notes ==
A. Because the Turnul Colţei was not a habitable building, it never held the title of tallest building in Bucharest. The tower was, however, the tallest free-standing structure in the city from 1714 until 1888. The building's clock tower was destroyed on October 14, 1802 by an earthquake. In 1888, the building was demolished.
B. This building was destroyed by an earthquake on November 10, 1940.
