= List of tallest buildings in Romania =

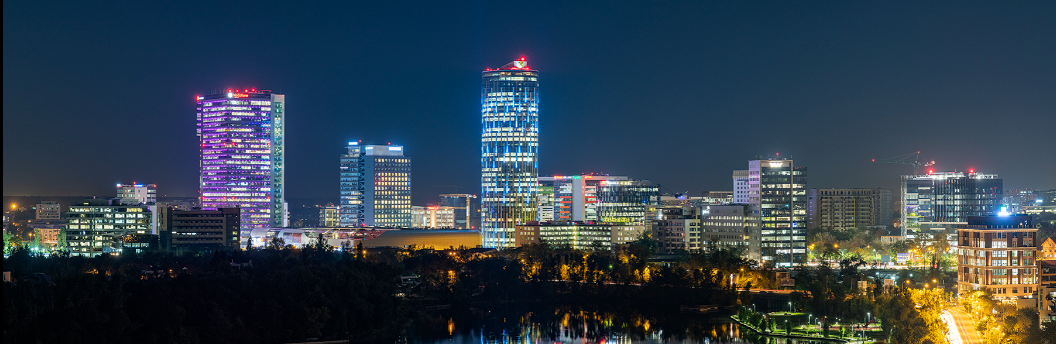
Bucharest skyline in 2022

This is a list of high rise buildings in Romania, itemizing buildings in Romania that are 60 metres (200 ft) or taller. This overlaps with topic of more complete List of tallest buildings in Bucharest, which lists 52 buildings 60 metres (200 ft) or taller in Bucharest alone. For other tall structures in Romania see list of tallest structures in Romania.

== Completed buildings ==
Was the tallest building in Romania upon completion

Name	Image	Height m (ft)	Floors	Year	Location	Notes
Floreasca City Center Sky Tower		157 m (515 ft)	37	2012	Bucharest; 44.4665°N 26.1022°E	Tallest building in Romania since topping out in 2012. Also the tallest office building in the country.
National Cathedral		133 m (436 ft)	N/A	2025	Bucharest; 44.4261°N 26.0807°E	Tallest orthodox church in Romania and the world. Topped out in 2019 and set to complete in 2025.
Globalworth Tower		128 m (420 ft)	23	2015	Bucharest; 44.2846°N 26.0601°E	Class A office building. Second tallest office building in Romania.
Ana Tower		120 m (394 ft)	24	2019	Bucharest; 44.4801°N 26.0656°E	Class A office building. Topped out in 2019.
Bucharest Tower Center (BTC)		106 m (348 ft)	26	2008	Bucharest; 44.4544°N 26.0812°E	Class A office building topped out in 2007. Tallest building in Romania between 2007 and 2012.
House of the Free Press		104 m (341 ft)	14	1957	Bucharest; 44.48090°N 26.07126°E	Tallest building in Bucharest between 1957 and 2007 and in the entire country from 1957 and 1984. Former headquarter of the communist newspaper Scînteia and the Bucharest Stock Exchange.
Administrative Palace		97 m (318 ft)	18	1984	Satu Mare; 47.4720°N 22.5223°E	Tallest administrative building in the Transylvania region.
West City Tower		95 m (312 ft)	25	2021	Cluj-Napoca; 46.7569°N 23.5439°E	Tallest residential building in Romania. Topped out in 2019.
Asmita T3		92 m (302 ft)	24	2009	Bucharest; 44.4070°N 26.1244°E	Tallest residential buildings in Bucharest. Only the "T3" tower rises up to 92 metres.
UBC 0		90 m (295 ft)	17	2023	Timișoara; 45.4559°N 21.1342°E	Was supposed to become the tallest building in Romania and was planned to reach a height of 155m (508 ft) with 27 floors, but the project was rescheduled due to the impact of the COVID-19 pandemic.
UBC 3		84 m (276 ft)	15	2019	Timișoara; 45.4559°N 21.1342°E	
Palace of the Parliament		84 m (276 ft)	12	1988	Bucharest; 44.4275°N 26.0874°E	10th-largest building in the world and second lagerst administrative building in the world. Topped out in 1988 and opened in 1997
Bucharest Financial Plaza		83 m (272 ft)	18	1997	Bucharest; 44.2558°N 26.0548°E	
BRD Tower		82 m (269 ft)	19	2003	Bucharest; 44.4526°N 26.0836°E	
Charles de Gaulle Plaza		80 m (262 ft)	16	2005	Bucharest; 44.4653°N 26.0874°E	
Euro Tower		80 m (262 ft)	19	2010	Bucharest; 44.4570°N 26.1044°E	
InterContinental Bucharest		77 m (253 ft)	25	1970	Bucharest; 44.4371°N 26.1022°E	
Monaco Towers		76 m (249 ft)	20	2009	Bucharest; 44.3708°N 26.1387°E	
Globalworth Plaza		76 m (249 ft)	20	2010	Bucharest; 44.4801°N 26.1016°E	
Cathedral Plaza		75 m (246 ft)	19	2010	Bucharest; 44.4420°N 26.0918°E	
City Gate Towers		75 m (246 ft)	18	2009	Bucharest; 44.4777°N 26.0711°E	
ISHO Riverside A		75 m (246 ft)	21	2021	Timișoara; 45.7610°N 21.2415°E	Tallest residential building in Timișoara.
Maurer Panoramic		74 m (243 ft)	23	2024	Cluj-Napoca; 46.7802°N 23.5924°E	
Oxygen Residence		74 m (243 ft)	19	2024	Cluj-Napoca; 46.7802°N 23.5924°E	
Unirii View		73 m (240 ft)	18	2018	Bucharest; 44.4309°N 26.1073°E	
Millennium Business Center		72 m (236 ft)	19	2006	Bucharest; 44.4373°N 26.1056°E	
Evocasa Uptown		72 m (236 ft)	18	2009	Ploiești; 44.9634°N 25.9944°E	
Palas – United Business Center 3		71 m (233 ft)	17	2012	Iași; 47.1562°N 27.5873°E	
ISHO Parkside D		70 m (230 ft)	20	2020	Timișoara; 45.7610°N 21.2415°E	Second tallest residential building in Timișoara.
Sheraton Bucharest Hotel		70 m (230 ft)	18	2001	Bucharest; 44.4466°N 26.0948°E	
Alia Apartments		70 m (230 ft)	22	2009	Bucharest; 44.4642°N 26.0710°E	
The Mark		70 m (230 ft)	15	2019	Bucharest; 44.2646°N 26.4506°E	
Business Development Center Bucharest		68 m (223 ft)	17	2004	Bucharest	
AFI Mall Towers Brasov		66 m (217 ft)	15	2020	Brasov; 45.6498°N 25.6079°E	
United Nations Plaza		66 m (217 ft)	18	1978	Bucharest; 44.4293°N 26.0954°E	
Mihai Viteazu Residence		65 m (213 ft)	16	2016	Sibiu; 45.7755°N 24.1598°E	
University of Medicine and Pharmacy		65 m (213 ft)	16	2004	Iași; 47.1006°N 27.3505°E	
Fructus Plaza		65 m (213 ft)	16	2011	Timișoara; 45.7595°N 21.2185°E	
PGV Tower		65 m (213 ft)	15	2006	Bucharest; 44.4228°N 26.1208°E	
Rin Grand Hotel		65 m (213 ft)	15	2008	Bucharest; 44.3986°N 26.1435°E	
BOS Tower		64 m (210 ft)	16	2007	Bucharest	
Wings		64 m (210 ft)	17	2021	Cluj-Napoca; 46.7474°N 23.5725°E	
Premium Plaza		64 m (210 ft)	15	2007	Bucharest; 44.4519°N 26.0786°E	
Vitan Platinum Towers		61 m (200 ft)	16	2011	Bucharest; 44.4120°N 26.1274°E	
UBC 2		60 m (197 ft)	12	2016	Timișoara; 45.4559°N 21.1342°E	
UBC 1		60 m (197 ft)	12	2016	Timișoara; 45.4559°N 21.1342°E	
Griro Tower		60 m (197 ft)	15	1984	Bucharest; 44.4618°N 26.0541°E	
Bucharest Corporate Center		60 m (197 ft)	15	2007	Bucharest; 44.2652°N 26.4543°E	

== Tallest under construction, approved and proposed ==
=== Under construction ===
Name	Location	Height (metres)	Floors (above ground)	Construction start	Scheduled completion	Notes
Catedrala Greco-Catolică „Sf. Iosif”	Cluj-Napoca	72		1992	2025	
NeoPeninsula	Bucharest	61	16	2006	N/A	
Metropolis	Craiova	52	14			
Dream Village	Iași	50	13			
Green Gate	Bucharest	46	12	2012	2014	

=== Cancelled and on-hold ===
Name	City	Height (m/ft)	Floors	Scheduled completion	Status
Esplanada City Center	Bucharest	250 m (820 ft)	70	2015	Cancelled
Mamaia North Complex	Constanța	220 m (722 ft)	42	–	On-hold
Dorobanți Tower	Bucharest	200 m (656 ft)	50	2013	Cancelled
Marina Park Constanța	Constanța	200 m (656 ft)	39	2015	Cancelled
Tender Financial Center	Timișoara	180 m (591 ft)	45	–	Cancelled
Dâmbovița Center Towers	Bucharest	155 m (509 ft)	35	2015	On-hold
United Business Center 0 (Original Proposal)	Timișoara	155 m (509 ft)	27	–	Cancelled
Mamaia Beach Residential	Constanța	150 m (492 ft)	34	2015	Approved
Timișoara High Tower	Timișoara	138 m (453 ft)	33	–	Proposed
Constanța Tower	Constanța	135 m (443 ft)	35	2015	Cancelled
Star Lido Hotel	Bucharest	135 m (443 ft)	35	–	Cancelled
Kiseleff Business Plaza	Bucharest	132 m (433 ft)	31	–	Proposed
Carol Tower	Bucharest	130 m (427 ft)	35	–	On-hold
Cefin Tower	Bucharest	125 m (410 ft)	36	–	On-hold
Colosseum Tower Bucharest	Bucharest	125 m (410 ft)	32	–	On-hold
Sky Towers Cluj-Napoca	Cluj-Napoca	125 m (410 ft)	32	–	Cancelled
Chitila Tower	Bucharest	120 m (394 ft)	30	–	Cancelled
Kron Tower	Brașov	120 m (394 ft)	30	–	Cancelled
Olympic Tower Bucharest	Bucharest	120 m (394 ft)	33	–	Proposed
Sigma Towers	Cluj-Napoca	120 m (394 ft)	35	–	On-hold
SkyTurn Brașov	Brașov	120 m (394 ft)	30	–	Cancelled
Petrom City Tower	Bucharest	117 m (384 ft)	27	2014	On-hold
Tron Tower	Bucharest	105 m (344 ft)	25	–	Cancelled
Golden Gate Tower	Iași	100 m (328 ft)	28	–	Cancelled

== See also ==
- List of tallest structures in Romania
- List of tallest buildings in Bucharest
- List of tallest buildings in the Balkans
