= List of buildings in Bucharest =

This is a list of prominent buildings in Bucharest, Romania, organized alphabetically within each category.

== Churches ==
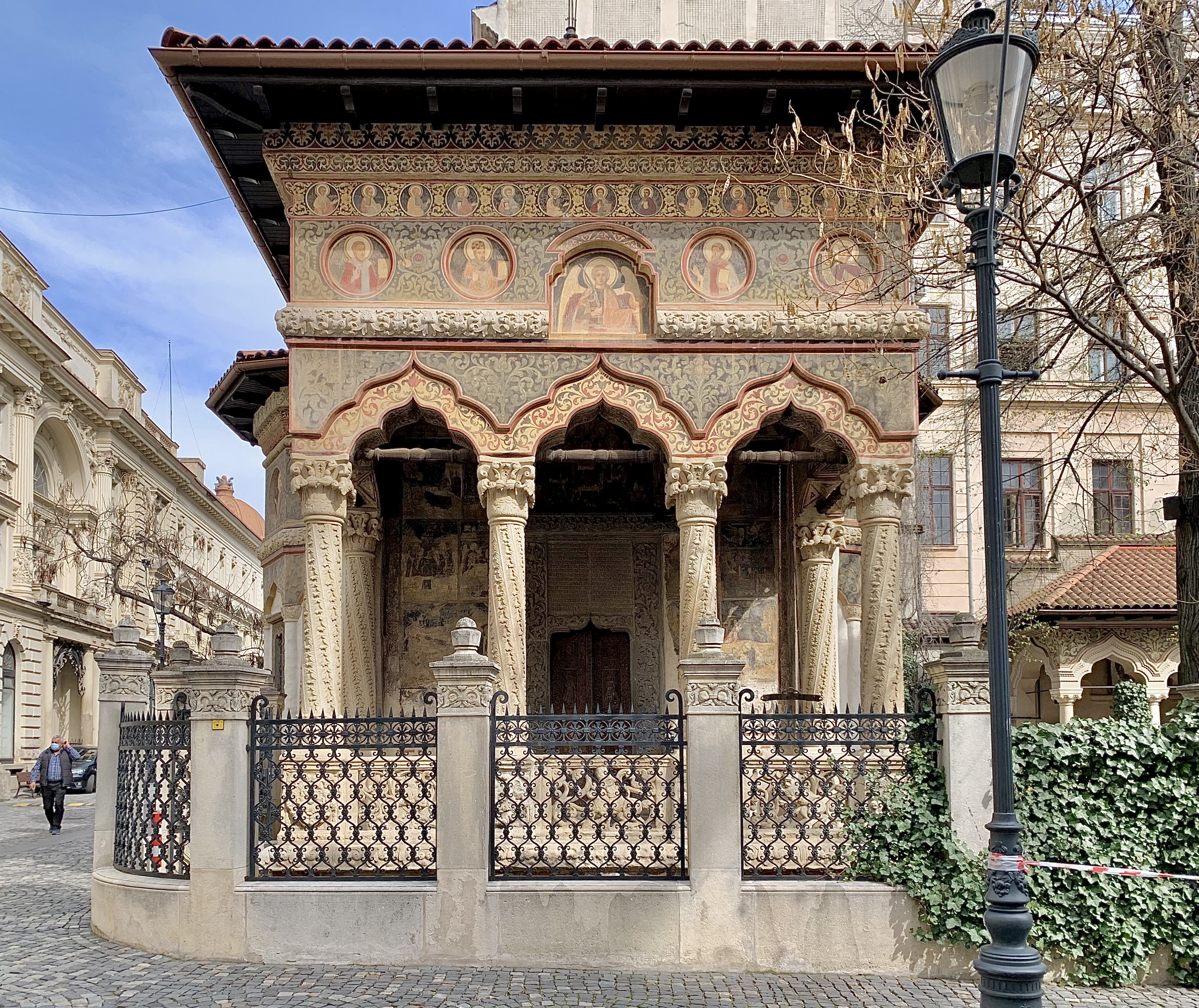
Stavropoleos Church

- Anglican Church
- Antim Monastery (Mănăstirea Antim)
- Apostle's Church (Biserica Sfinții Apostoli)
- Boteanu Church
- Bărăția Church – oldest Roman Catholic church
- Bucur the Shepherd (Bucur Ciobanul) – the oldest standing
- Doamnei Church (Biserica Doamnei)
- Domnița Bălașa Church
- Italian Church (Chiesa Italiana / Biserica Italiană)
- Kretzulescu Church
- New St. George Church (Sf. Gheorghe Nou)
- Patriarchal Cathedral (Catedrala Patriarhală)
- Radu Vodă Monastery
- Sacré-Cœur French Church
- St. Anthony Curtea Veche Church
- Saint Haralambie Church (Biserica Sfântul Haralambie)
- Saint Joseph Cathedral (Catedrala Sfântul Iosif), Roman Catholic Cathedral
- St. Nicholas (formerly known as the Russian Church)
- Stavropoleos Church (Biserica Stavropoleos)

== Museums ==
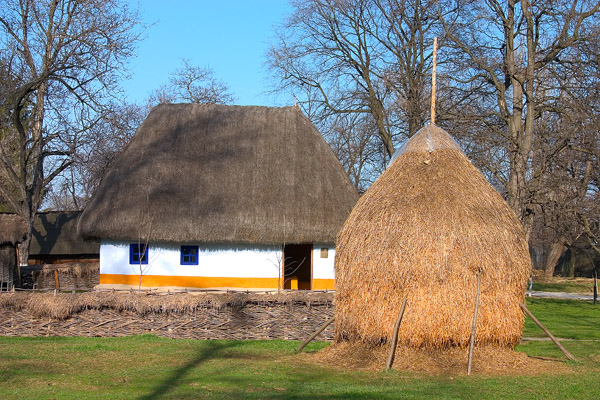
A house in the Village Museum

== Colleges and universities ==
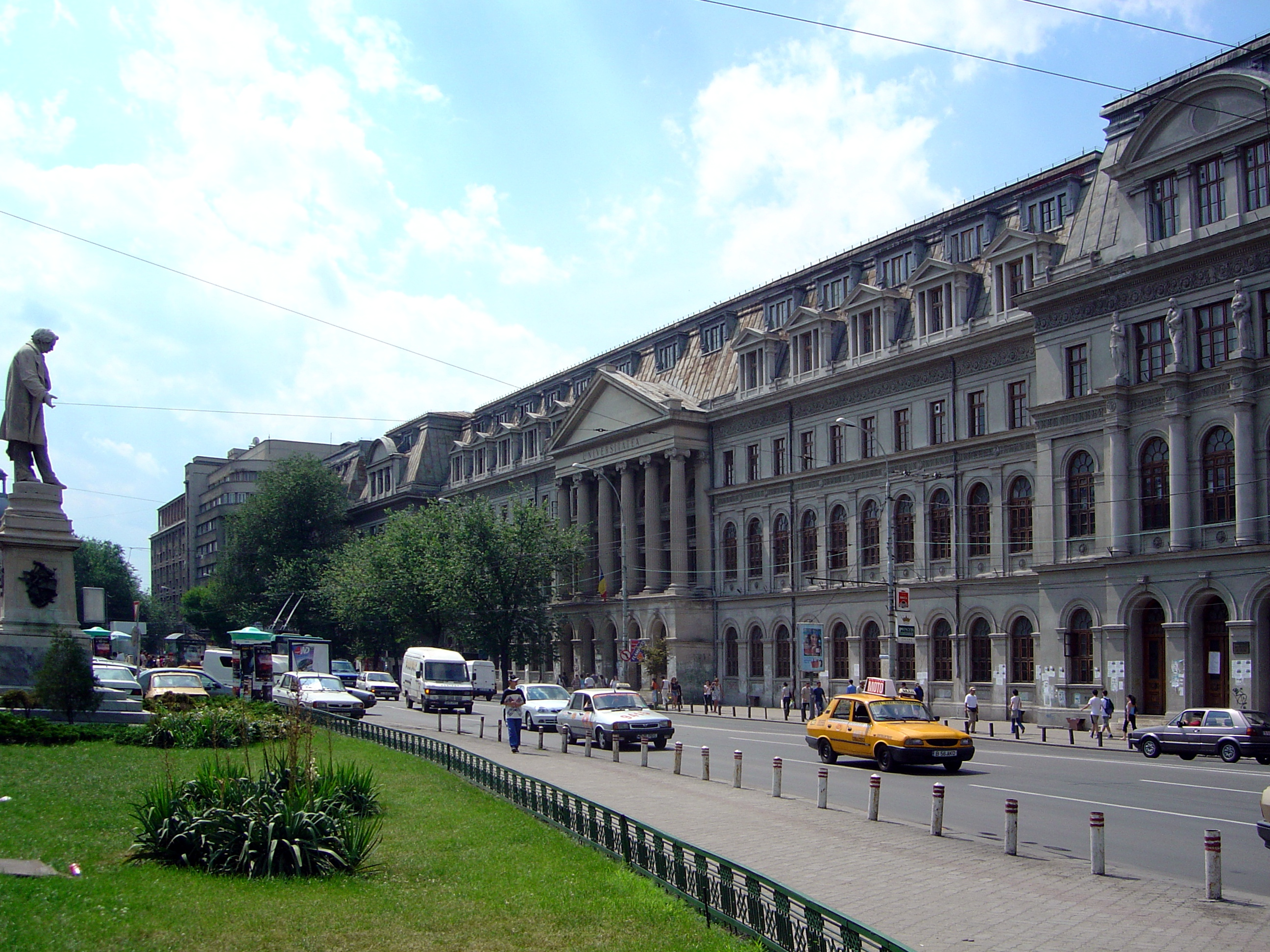
University of Bucharest

Public universities and colleges:

- Academy of Economic Studies (Academia de Studii Economice)
- Architecture Institute (Institutul de Arhitectură Ion Mincu)
- Art University (Universitatea de Arte)
- I. L. Caragiale National University of Theatre and Film (Universitatea Națională de Artă Teatrală și Cinematografică "I. L. Caragiale")
- Carol Davila University of Medicine and Pharmacy (Universitatea de Medicină și Farmacie Carol Davila)
- Microtechnology Institute (Institutul de Microtehnologie)
- Music University (Universitatea de Muzică)
- National Academy of Sports (Academia Naţională de Educaţie Fizică și Sport)
- National School of Political Science and Public Administration (Școala Națională de Studii Politice și Administrative)
- Polytechnic University of Bucharest (Universitatea Politehnică București)
- Technical University of Construction (Universitatea Tehnică de Construcții)
- University of Agronomy and Veterinary Medicine (Universitatea de Științe Agricole și Medicină Veterinară)
- University of Bucharest (Universitatea București)

== Miscellaneous ==
Palace of the Parliament

- Bucharest Mall
- Central University Library of Bucharest (Biblioteca Centrală Universitară)
- City Mall
- Kretzulescu Palace
- Elisabeta Palace
- House of the Free Press
- National Military Center (Cercul Militar Național)
- Old Court (Curtea Veche) ruins
- Palace Casino
- Palace of the Parliament (Palatul Parlamentului)
- Pasajul Macca-Vilacrosse
- Plaza Romania
- Unirea Shopping Center

== Office buildings ==
- BRD Tower Bucharest
- Bucharest Financial Plaza
- Bucharest Tower Center
- City Gate Towers
- Crystal Tower
- Euro Tower
- Floreasca City Center
- Globalworth Tower

== Theaters ==
The National Theatre, 2006

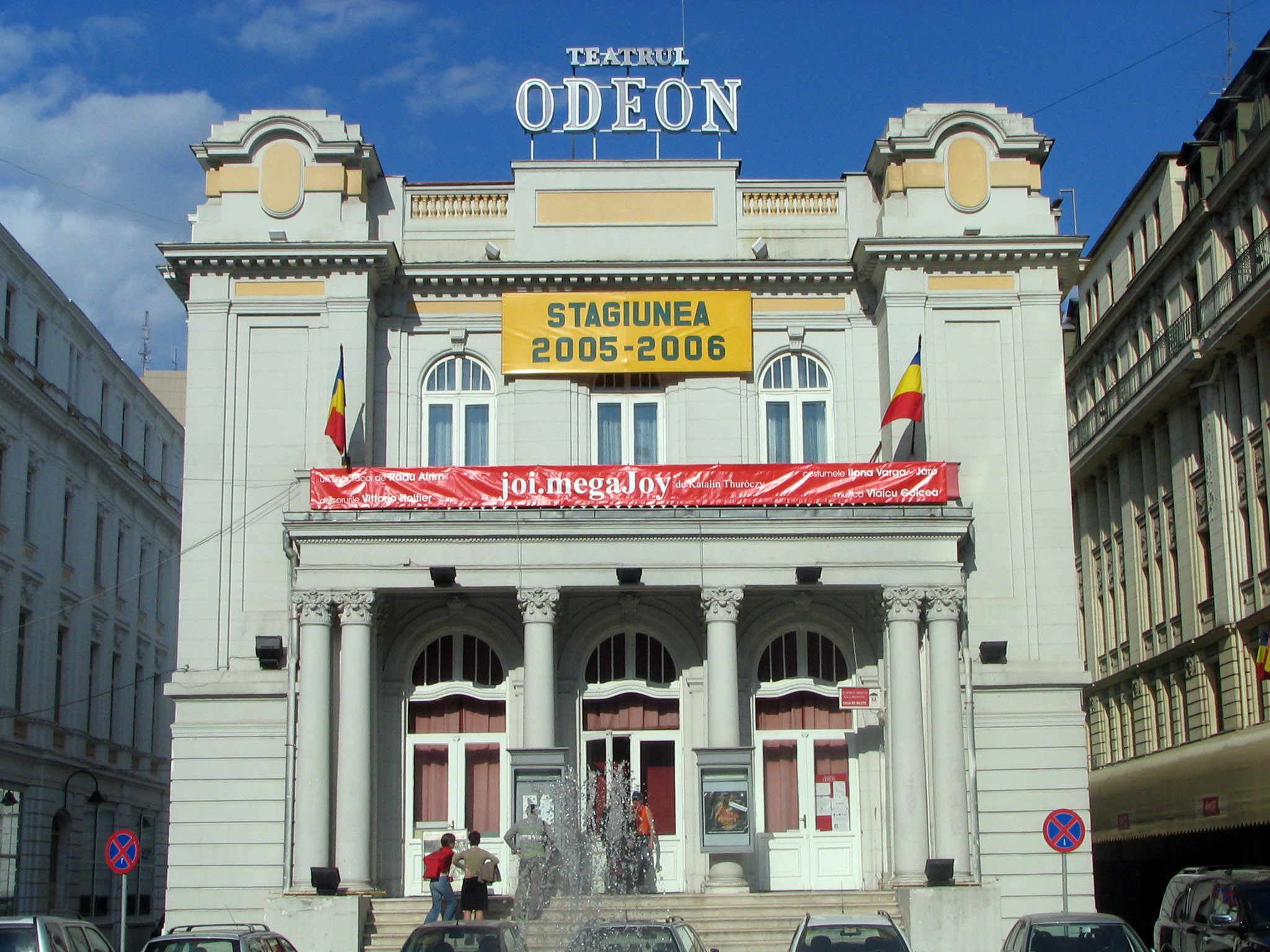
Odeon Theatre

- Act Theater (Teatrul Act)
- Bulandra Theatre
- C. Tănase Theater (Teatrul C. Tănase), home of a satirical revue
- Casandra Theater Studio (Studioul Casandra), student theater
- Comedy Theater (Teatrul de Comedie)
- Excelsior Theater (Teatrul Excelsior)
- Green Hours Theater (Teatrul Luni de la Green Hours)
- In Culise Theatre (Teatrul In Culise)
- Ion Creangă Theater (puppet theater)
- Nottara Theater (Teatrul Nottara)
- Odeon Theatre
- Operetta (Teatrul Naţional de Operetă)
- National Theatre Bucharest (Teatrul Naţional I.L. Caragiale)
- Small Theater (Teatrul Mic)
- State Jewish Theater (Teatrul Evreiesc de Stat)
- Ţăndărică Theater (puppet theater)
- Theatrum Mundi
- Union Theater
- Very Small Theater (Teatrul Foarte Mic)

== Other performance venues ==
- Radio Hall (Sala Radio)
- Romanian Athenaeum (Ateneul Român)
- Romanian National Opera (Opera Română)

== Hotels ==
Athenee Palace Hilton Bucharest Hotel

Howard Johnson Hotel

This is not a comprehensive list of hotels in Bucharest, only those of architectural or historic significance.

- Athenee Palace Hilton Bucharest Hotel
- InterContinental Bucharest

== Restaurants ==
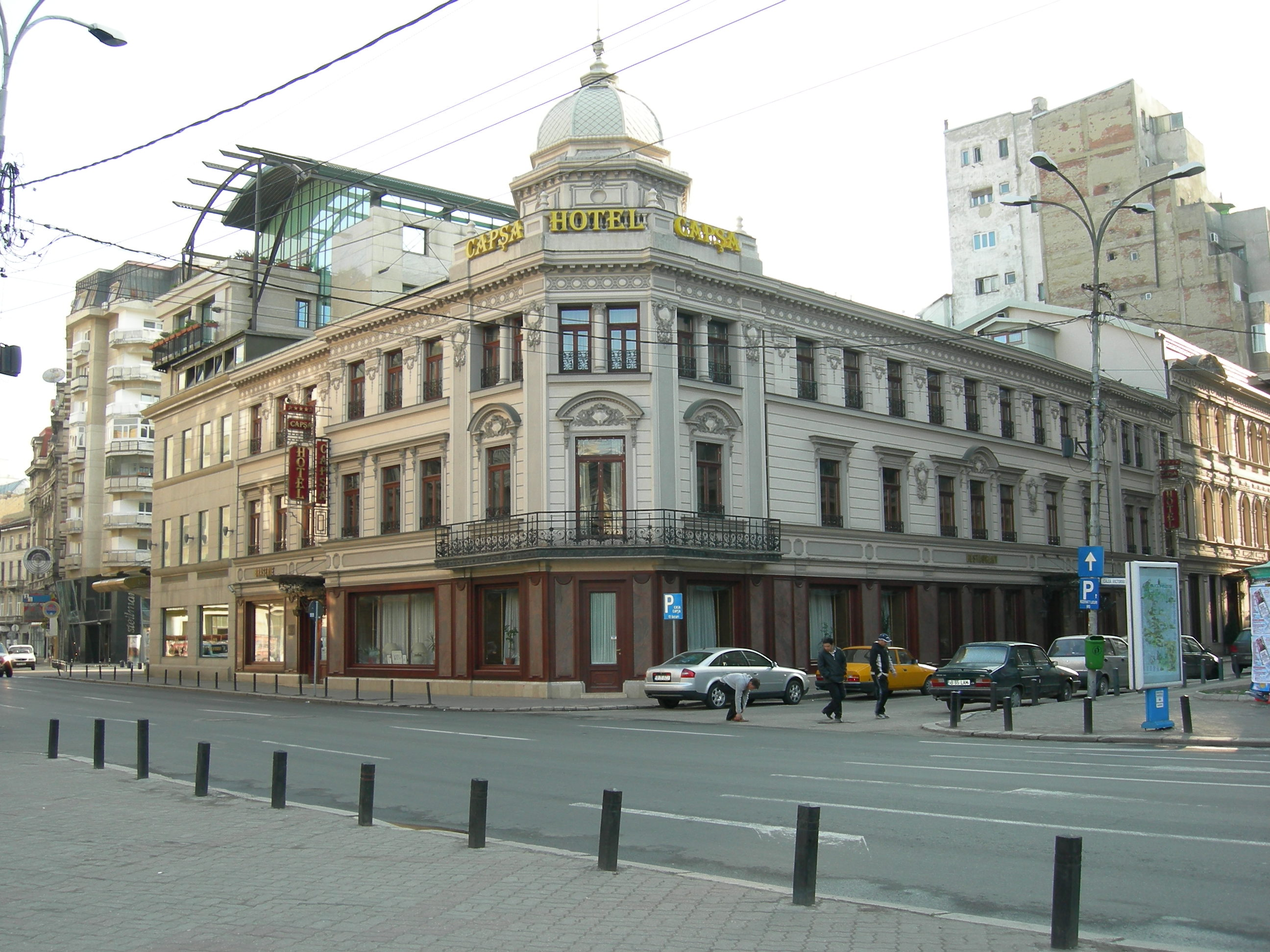
Casa Capsa Restaurant

This is not a comprehensive list of restaurants in Bucharest, only those of architectural or historic significance.

- Caru' cu Bere
- Casa Capșa

== Bars and clubs ==
This is not a comprehensive list of bars and clubs in Bucharest, only those of architectural or historic significance or which are significant as performance venues.

- Caru' cu Bere (literally, "beer wagon")
- Lăptăria Enache (literally, "Enache's milk-shop")
