= Orhideea Towers =

Office building in Bucharest, Romania

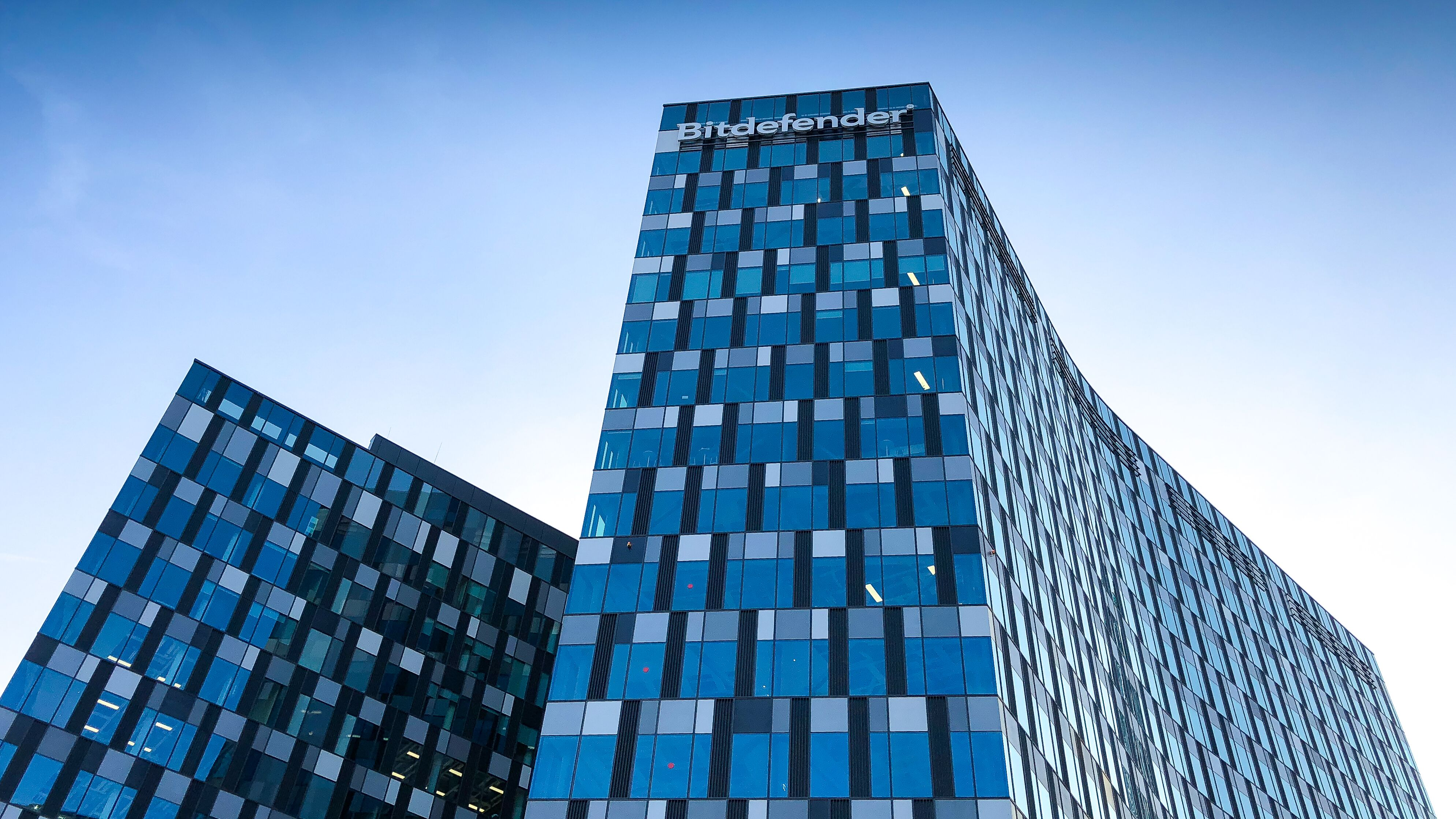
- Orhideea Towers in February 2023

General information
- Status: Completed
- Type: Office building
- Location: Șoseaua Orhideelor 15A, Bucharest, Romania
- Coordinates: 44°26′38.4″N 26°3′35.3″E
- Construction started: October 2015
- Completed: July 2018
- Opening: July 2018
- Cost: €75 million
- Owner: Pavăl Holding

Height
- Tip: 63 m (207 ft)

Technical details
- Floor count: 17 and 13 (including technical floors)
- Floor area: 37,000 m^{2} (400,000 sq ft) (leasable)

Design and construction
- Architect: BEHF Architects
- Developer: CA Immo
- Structural engineer: Popp & Asociații
- Main contractor: PORR

Orhideea Towers is an office building located in the Grozăvești area of Bucharest, Romania, near the Politehnica University of Bucharest and the Regie student campus. Completed in 2018, the building consists of two interconnected wings with 17 and 13 floors, respectively, reaching a maximum height of approximately 63 m (207 ft) and providing around 37,000 m^{2} (400,000 sq ft) of leasable office space. Developed by Austrian property company CA Immo, the building was acquired in 2022 by Pavăl Holding, the investment company of the owners of Dedeman.

== Development and construction ==
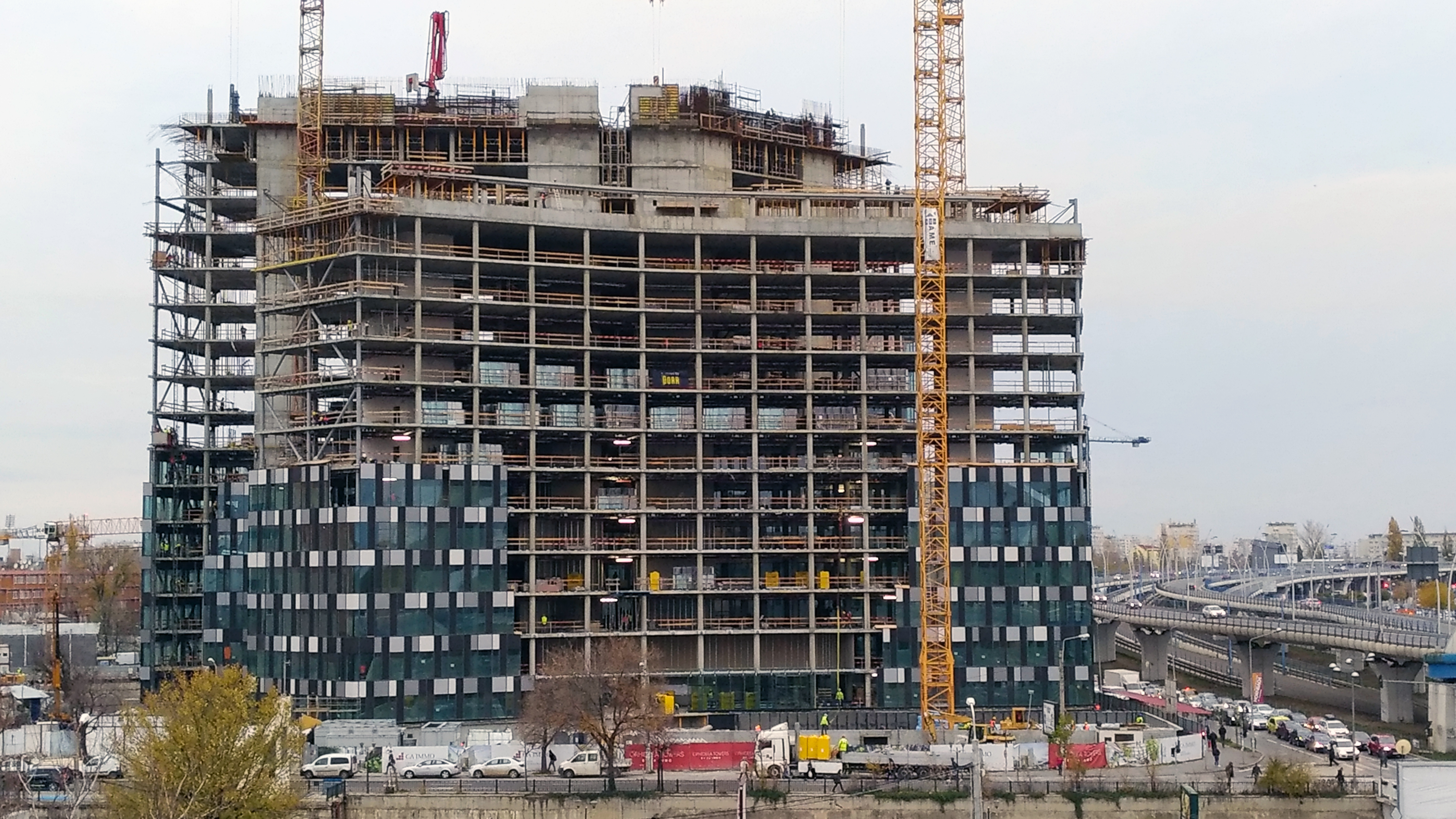
Orhideea Towers under construction in November 2017

The original development plans envisaged two 20-storey towers with a combined leasable area of approximately 50,000 m^{2} (540,000 sq ft). By 2014, the project had been scaled down to two wings of different heights, with a total leasable area of approximately 37,000 m^{2} (400,000 sq ft).

Construction began in October 2015 with foundation works carried out by Octagon Contracting & Engineering. In February 2016, PORR was appointed as the main contractor for the subsequent construction phase.

The building was completed in July 2018, with a total investment of approximately €75 million. The first tenants began occupying the building that same month.

In November 2022, Pavăl Holding acquired Orhideea Towers as part of its purchase of CA Immo's entire Romanian office portfolio, comprising seven properties in Bucharest. The transaction was valued at approximately €377 million.

== Architecture and facilities ==
Designed by Austrian architectural firm BEHF Architects, Orhideea Towers has an irregular, butterfly-shaped layout consisting of two wings of different heights. The northern wing has 17 above-ground levels, while the southern wing has 13, including technical floors. The building reaches a maximum height of approximately 63 m (207 ft).

The original design envisaged connecting the two wings by a skybridge concealed behind a glazed facade. This solution was subsequently abandoned due to the risk of the two wings colliding during earthquakes. Instead, they were rigidly connected through common reinforced concrete floor slabs. These slabs range in thickness from 30 to 50 cm and are reinforced with embedded steel sections to withstand the forces generated between the two wings during seismic activity.

The structural design was developed by Popp & Asociații, while detailed engineering for the second construction phase was undertaken by Prodesign Engineering & Construction. The building incorporates fluid viscous seismic dampers designed to limit lateral displacement during earthquakes.

Orhideea Towers has two underground parking levels and an additional technical basement, providing a total of 406 parking spaces. Other facilities include bicycle storage, showers and changing rooms. The building has received LEED Platinum certification for its environmental performance.

== Tenants ==
Major tenants have included Thales, Bitdefender and Finastra. In 2018, Bitdefender occupied approximately 9,300 m^{2} (100,000 sq ft), while financial software company Misys, which became part of Finastra, had leased 8,000 m^{2} (86,000 sq ft).

In October 2019, Thales became the building's largest tenant after expanding its leased office space to nearly 11,000 m^{2} (120,000 sq ft), representing approximately 30% of the total leasable area.

In 2020, American insurance company MassMutual leased an additional 1,300 m^{2} (14,000 sq ft) on the building's top floor for its Romanian global business services centre.

== See also ==
- List of tallest buildings in Bucharest
- List of tallest buildings in Romania
