= Monaco Towers =

Skyscraper in Bucharest

- Interactive map of the Monaco Towers area

General information
- Status: Completed
- Type: Residential
- Location: Bucharest, Romania, 96 Șoseaua Berceni 041918, Bucharest
- Coordinates: 44.3708°N 26.1387°E
- Completed: 2009

Height
- Roof: 76 m (249 ft) (both towers)

Technical details
- Structural system: Concrete
- Floor count: 20
- Floor area: 57,223 m^{2} (616,000 sq ft)

Design and construction
- Architect: Westfourth Arhitecture

The Monaco Towers are a residential building complex in Bucharest, Romania consisting of two twin towers completed in 2009 (Tower 1 and Tower 2) standing at 76 m (249 ft) tall with 20 floors each. They share the seventeenth place in the top of the tallest buildings in Bucharest.

== Architecture ==
The two towers are part of the namesake project in which a shopping centre and residential space including the basement car parking are also included. The two twin residential towers host a total of 304 apartments and are situated above an integrated body of two floors of parking and two floors of retail spaces. The land on which the complex was built sums up to 7,452 m^{2} usable space. The gross floor area for each tower is 869.9 m^{2}. The apartment floor areas measure 75 m^{2} and 81 m^{2}.

== See also ==
- List of tallest buildings in Romania
- List of buildings in Bucharest
- List of tallest buildings in Bucharest
