= Eurotower =

Eurotower may refer to:

- Eurotower (Frankfurt am Main), a high-rise building in Frankfurt, Germany, once a headquarters of the European Central Bank
- Eurotower (Zagreb), a high-rise building in Zagreb, Croatia, headquarters of the Zagreb Stock Exchange
- Euro Tower (Bucharest), a high-rise building in Bucharest, Romania, mainly headquarters of the company eSilicon
