= Dâmbovița =

Dâmbovița can refer to these places in Romania:

- Dâmbovița County
- Dâmbovița (river)
- Dâmbovița Center, an unfinished Romanian building in Bucharest, near Cotroceni
