= Ana Tower =

Skyscraper in Bucharest

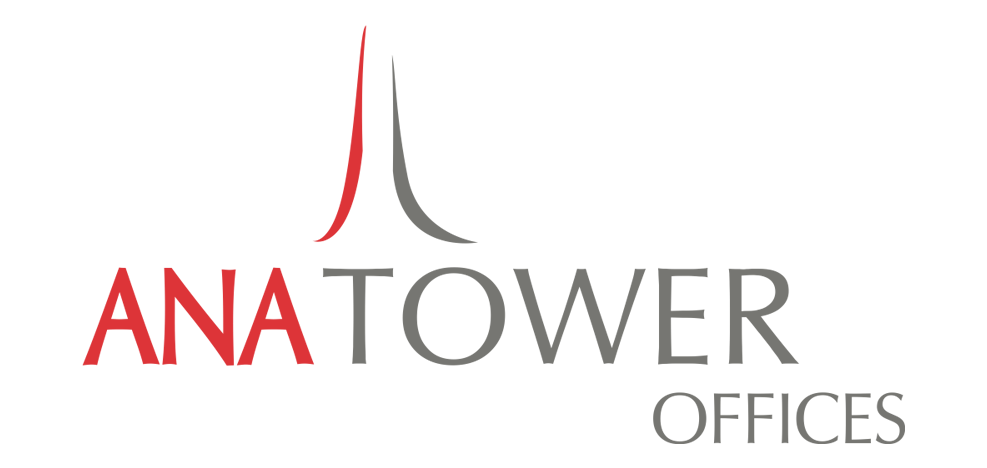

- Interactive map of the Ana Tower area

General information
- Status: Completed
- Type: Office
- Location: Bucharest, Romania
- Coordinates: 44.4801°N 26.0656°E
- Completed: 2019
- Opening: March 2020
- Cost: €60,000,000 ($71,000,000)
- Owner: Ana Holding

Height
- Roof: 110 m (360 ft)

Technical details
- Structural system: Concrete
- Floor count: 24 (+1 technical)
- Floor area: 43,700 m^{2} (470,000 sq ft)
- Lifts/elevators: 8

Design and construction
- Architects: Vladimir Arsene, Călin Negoescu (Westfourth Architecture)
- Developer: George Copos
- Structural engineer: Tiberiu Vișan (Popp & Associates)

Website
- anatower.ro

Ana Tower is a class A office building in Bucharest, Romania. Completed in 2019, it is the fourth tallest building in the country, being divided into 24 floors (+1 technical) and standing at a total of 110 metres (361 ft) tall. Upon its completion, the building received a LEED Platinum Certificate awarded by the U.S. Green Building Council on 11 June 2020. The building was inaugurated in March 2020.

== See also ==
- List of tallest buildings in Romania
- List of buildings in Bucharest
- List of tallest buildings in Bucharest
