= Asmita =

Asmita may refer to:

- ABP Asmita, an Indian television news channel
- Asmita Dey (born 2003), Indian judoka
- Asmita Gardens, a residential complex in Bucharest
- Asmita Marwa (active since 1990s), Indian fashion designer
- Asmita Sood (born 1989), Indian model
- Yoga (philosophy) Epistemology referring to Egoism
