= Piraeus (disambiguation) =

Piraeus is a city in the Attica, Greece.

Piraeus may also refer to:

- Piraeus (regional unit) in Attica region, Greece

== Companies ==
- Piraeus Bank
  - Piraeus Bank Romania
  - Piraeus Bank Tower Bucharest
- Piraeus Port Authority
- Piraeus Container Terminal, a subsidiary of COSCO

== Museums ==
- Archaeological Museum of Piraeus
- Municipal Art Gallery of Piraeus

== Sports ==
- Olympiacos Piraeus, a multisport club and its departments:
  - Olympiacos F.C.
  - Olympiacos B.C.
  - Olympiacos S.C.
  - Olympiacos Water Polo Club
  - Olympiacos CFP (Superleague Formula team)
- Ethnikos Piraeus, a multisport club and its departments:
  - Ethnikos Piraeus F.C.
  - Ethnikos Piraeus Water Polo Club
- Piraeus Football Clubs Association
- Athens-Piraeus Football Clubs Association

== Transport ==
- Piraeus station
- Athens-Piraeus Electric Railway
- Port of Piraeus
- Piraeus, Athens and Peloponnese Railways
- Piraeus-Perama light railway
- Piraeus Railway Works

== Other ==
- Piraeus A and Piraeus B, parliamentary constituencies
- Piraeus Prefecture
- Piraeus Lion
- University of Piraeus
- Battle of Piraeus
- Pireus (mythology)
