= Unicredit Tower Bucharest =

Romanian office building

Unicredit Țiriac Bank
- Unicredit Tower Bucharest
- Interactive map of the Unicredit Țiriac Bank area

General information
- Status: Completed
- Location: Bucharest, Romania
- Coordinates: 44.474194°N 26.067928°E
- Construction started: 2010
- Completed: 2012
- Opening: 2012

Height
- Roof: 64 m (210 ft)

Technical details
- Floor count: 15
- Floor area: 28,000 m^{2} (300,000 sq ft)

Design and construction
- Architect: Westfourth Architecture
- Structural engineer: Popp & Asociații

The UniCredit Țiriac Bank headquarters is a class A office building located in the city of Bucharest, Romania. The facility consists of one 64-meter-tall (210 ft) building with 15 floors, with a total surface area of 28,000 m^{2} (6,000 m^{2} below ground level and 22,000 m^{2} above ground).
