= Popp & Asociații =

Romanian professional services company

- Industry: Civil Engineering, Professional Services
- Founded: 2002
- Founder: Traian Popp
- Headquarters: Bucharest, Romania
- Key people: Dragoș Marcu, Chief Executive Officer Mădălin Coman, Chief Technical Director
- Services: Structural Design Structural Assessment Seismic Retrofit Design Geotechnical Design Site Monitoring Project Management Construction Project Consulting
- Number of employees: 75
- Website: www.p-a.ro

Popp & Asociații is a professional services company based in Bucharest, Romania. It provides structural design & assessment, consultancy, retrofitting design, and project management services for all aspects of the built environment either existing or new, including infrastructure works design.

== General Information ==
The company was founded in 2002 by prof. Traian Popp, a preeminent Romanian senior structural engineer, along with fellow engineering professionals Dragoș Marcu and Mădălin Coman.

Popp & Asociații had its breakthrough projects in 2004, with the structural design of the Charles de Gaulle Plaza office tower and the seismic structural retrofitting of the 110 year old Bucharest Palace of Justice. The Charles de Gaulle Plaza tower site conditions imposed a top-down infrastructure approach for the building's 5 underground levels, the first of its kind in Romania. Equivalent ground-breaking techniques had to be used for the Palace of Justice retrofitting and strengthening as the palace was listed in the 1980s to be demolished in 1990 due to irreparable seismic damage following the 1977 earthquake.

The company has continuously evolved thereafter, progressively broadening its expertise and range of services. The Popp & Asociații Group now provides geotechnical engineering services, along with building and site monitoring, on site and laboratory material testing services, research and development and structural design consultancy services.

The Popp & Asociații portfolio spans over a large range of projects, including high-rise office and residential buildings, large-scale commercial centres, deep excavations and historical monuments of national and international importance. Further business includes international consulting contracts for the evaluation of existing buildings to seismic actions, along with research activities for the development of design codes and guides.

== Notable Projects ==
=== New Structures ===
Charles de Gaulle Plaza Bucharest 2004

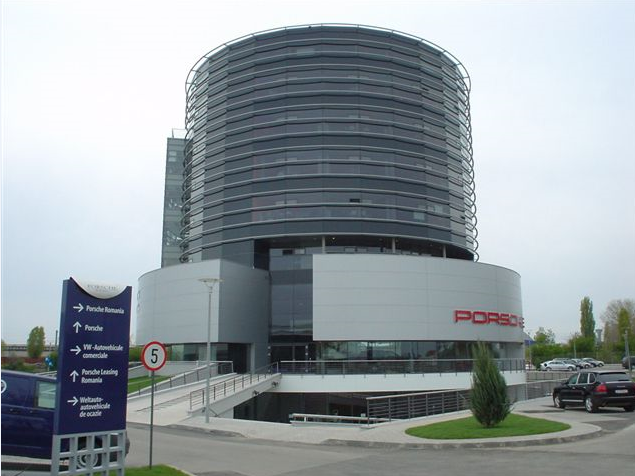
Porsche România head offices Bucharest 2004

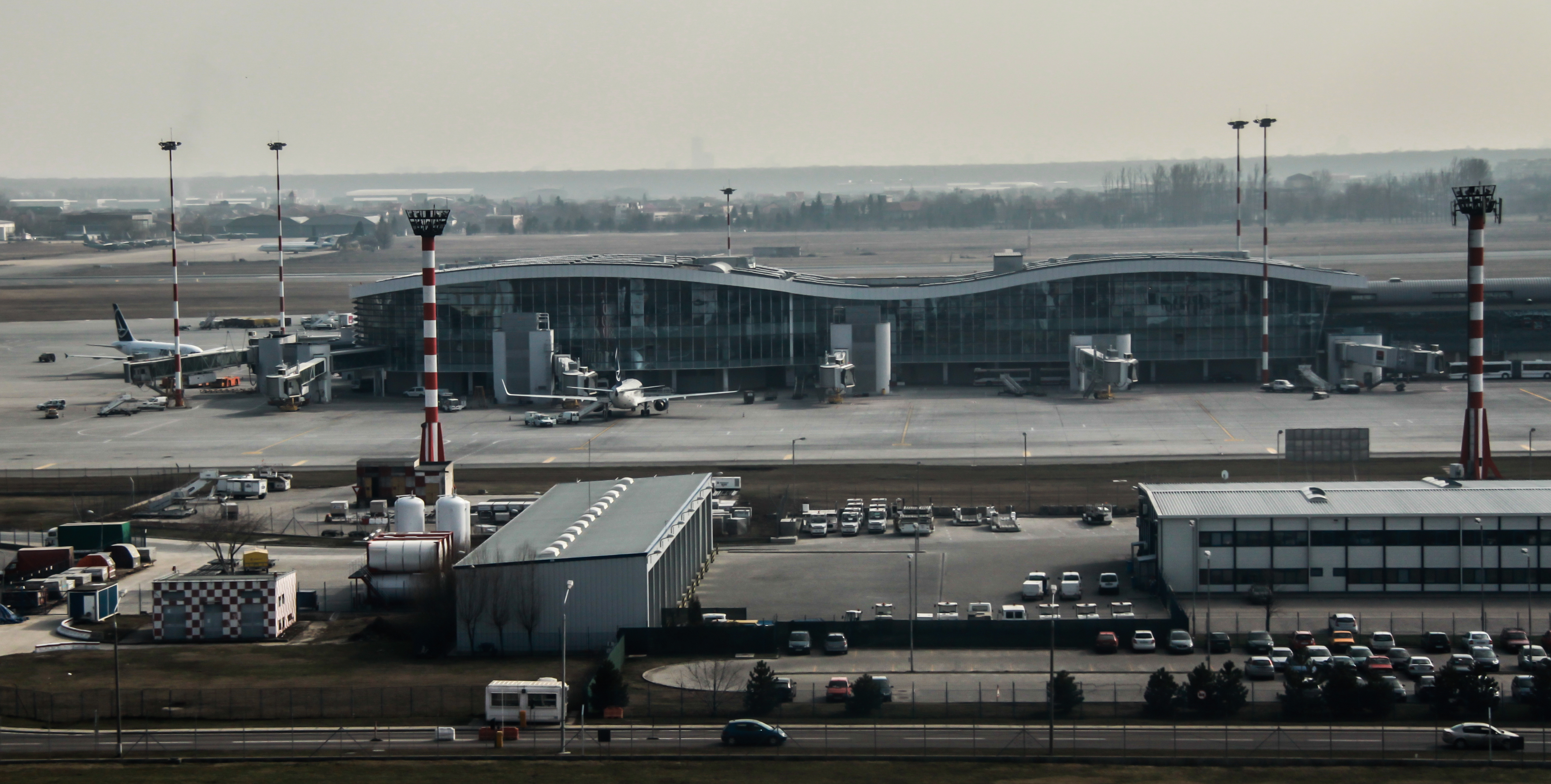
Henri Coandă Airport Finger Terminal Bucharest 2010

Cathedral Plaza Bucharest 2011

=== Existing Structures Rehabilitation ===
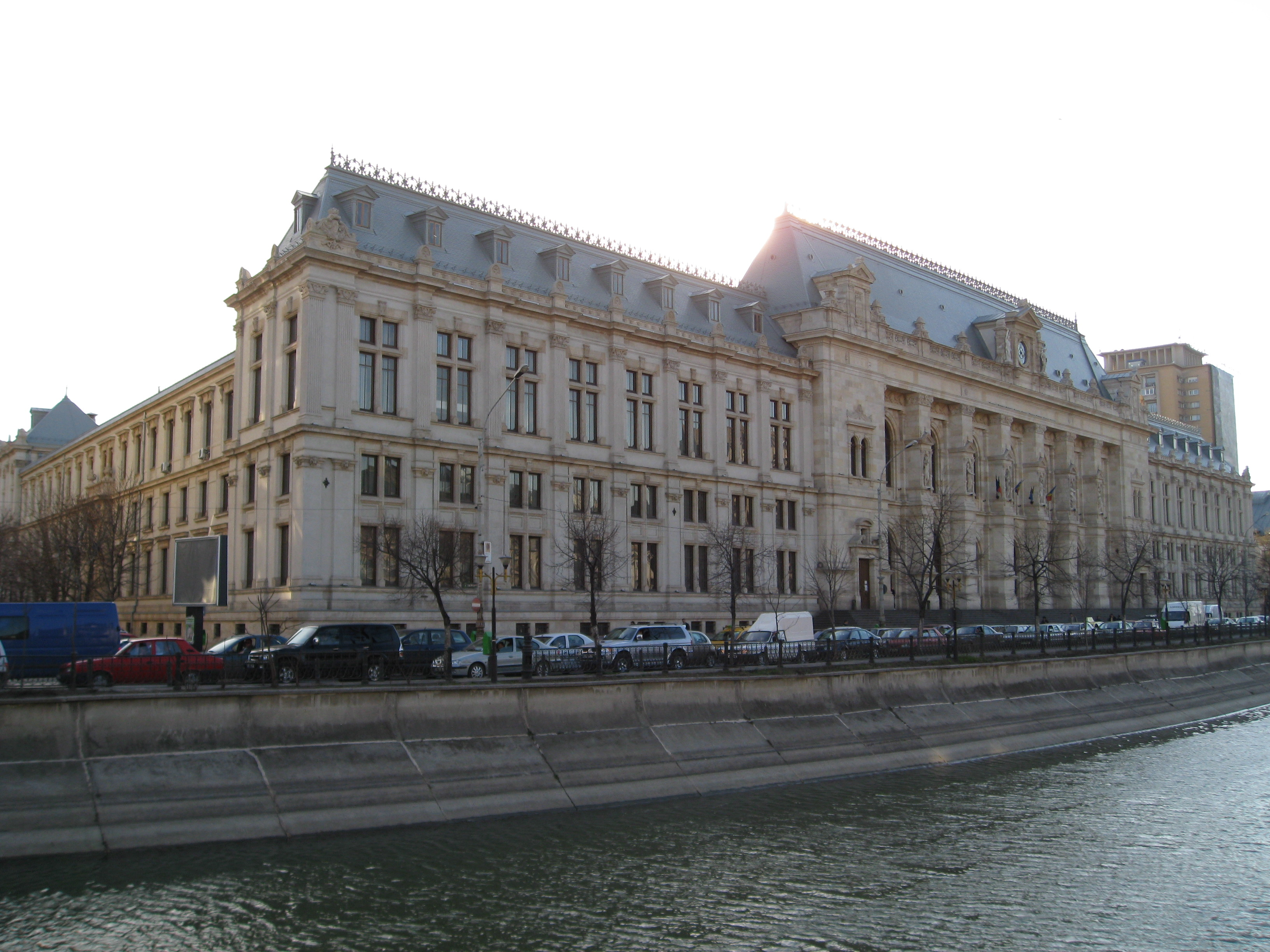
Palace of Justice, Bucharest structural rehabilitation 2004

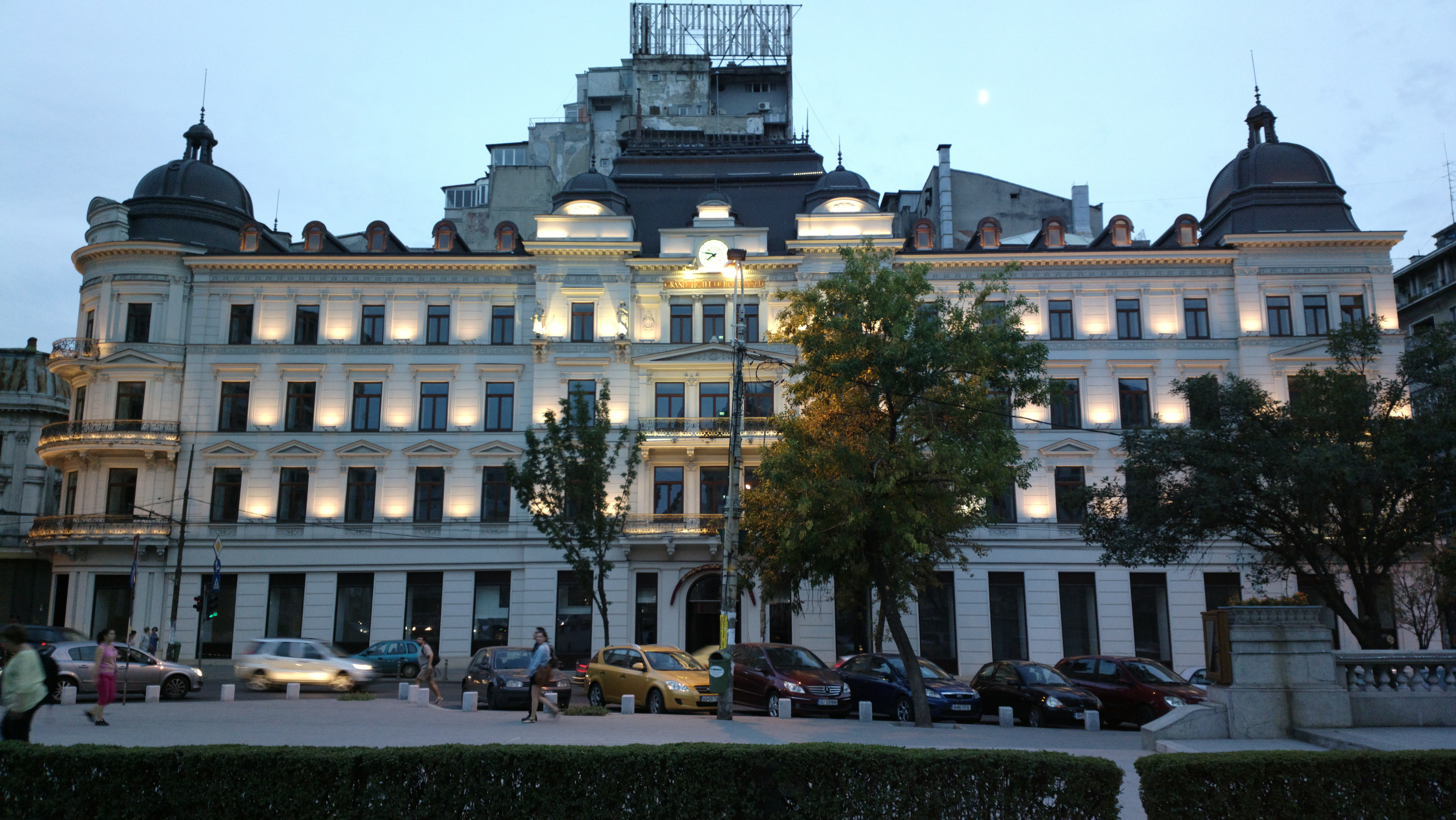
Grand Hotel Boulevard structural rehabilitation, Bucharest 2012

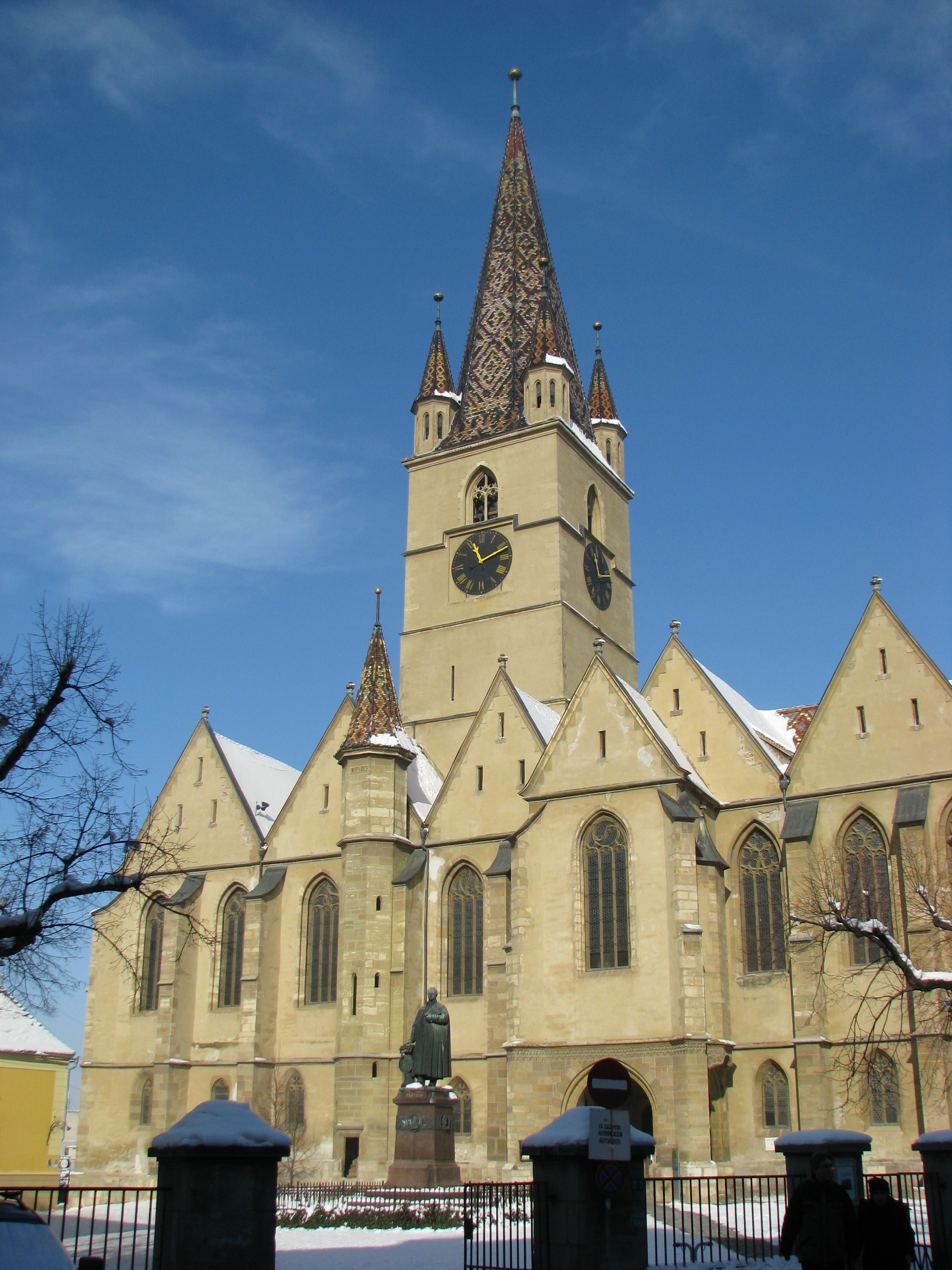
Lutheran C.A. Cathedral structural rehabilitation, Sibiu 2013

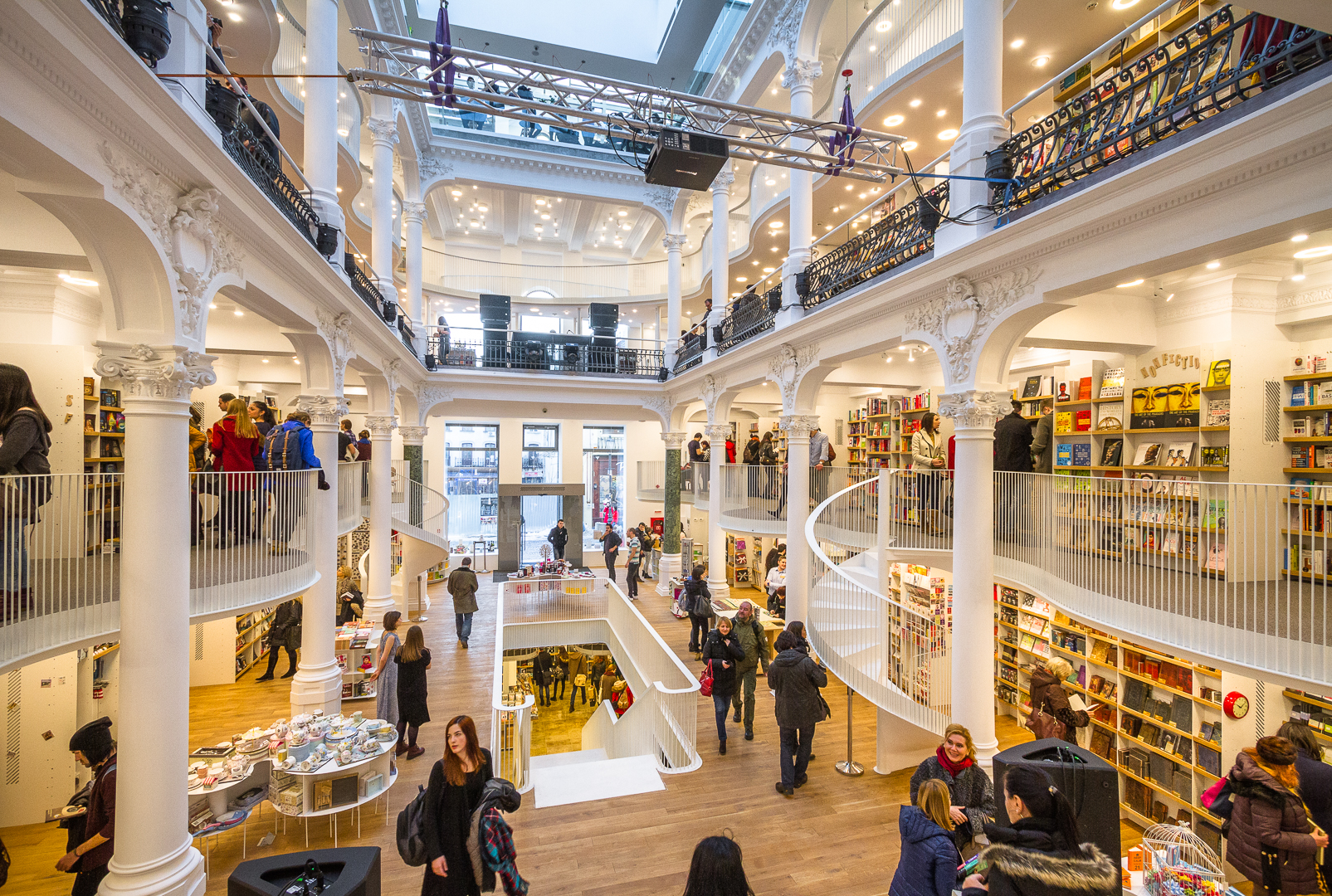
Cărturești Carusel Bookstore structural rehabilitation, Bucharest 2014

== Awards ==
- The Romanian Structural Design Civil Engineering Association 2015 Awards - Second Place - The Patriarchate's Palace Rehabilitation, Bucharest;
- The Romanian Structural Design Civil Engineering Association 2015 Awards - Third Place - E.On Romania Head Office building, Târgu Mureș;
- The Romanian Structural Design Civil Engineering Association 2014 Awards - First Place - Green Court office plaza, Bucharest;
- The Romanian Structural Design Civil Engineering Association 2012 Awards - First Place - Unicredit Țiriac Bank office building, Bucharest;
- European Award for Steel Structures 2011 - Development and modernization of the Henri Coandă International Airport, technical and technological solutions in designing the International Departures Terminal;
- The Romanian Structural Design Civil Engineering Association 2011 Awards - First Place - City Gate Towers office building complex, Bucharest;
