= Globalworth Tower =

Skyscraper in Bucharest

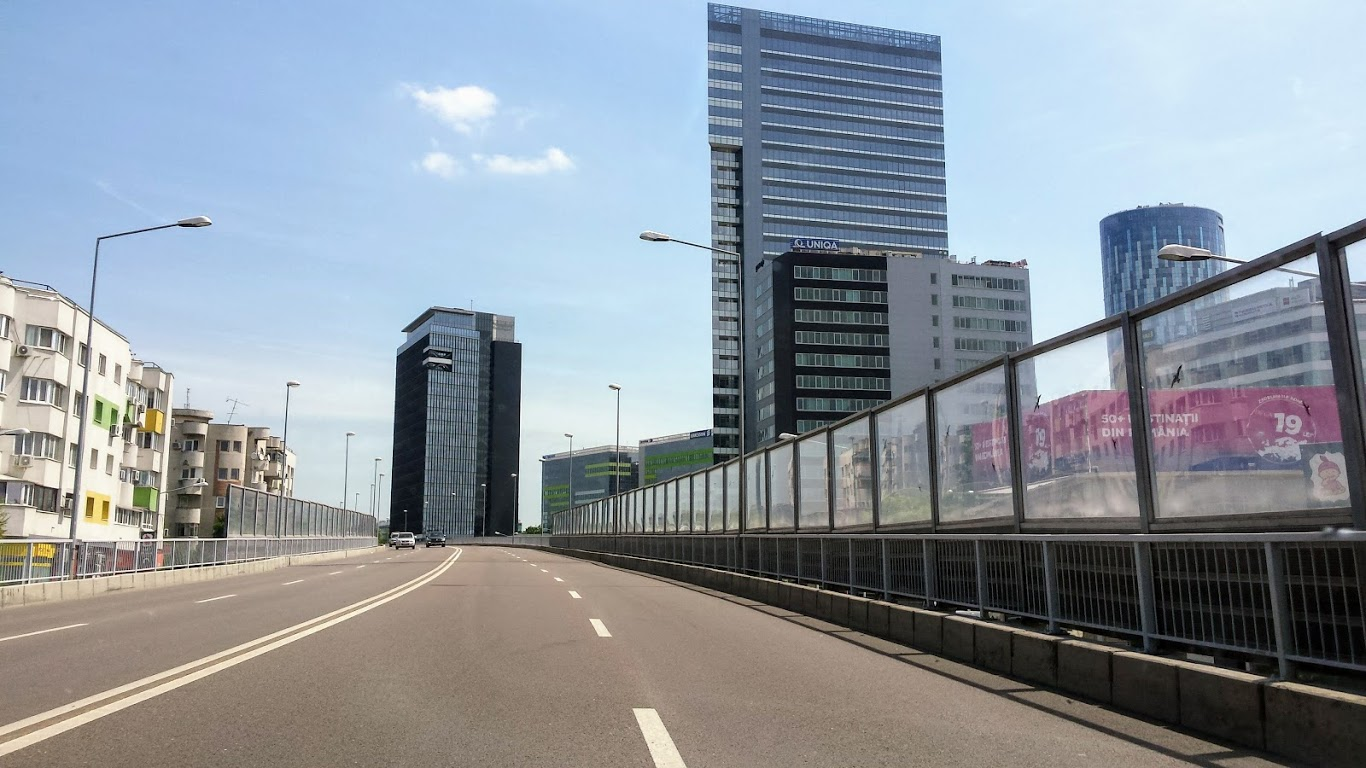
- Globalworth Tower (middle)

- Location within Romania

General information
- Status: Completed
- Type: Office
- Location: Bucharest, Romania
- Coordinates: 44.4794°N 26.1004°E
- Completed: 2016
- Cost: €60,000,000 ($71,000,000)
- Owner: Globalworth

Height
- Roof: 118 m (387 ft)

Technical details
- Floor count: 23
- Floor area: 48,732 m^{2} (524,550 sq ft)

Design and construction
- Developer: Globalworth Real Estate Investments

Website
- www.globalworth.com/buildings/office/globalworth-tower/

Globalworth Tower, known previously as Bucharest One, is a class A office building that is located in the northern part of Bucharest, Romania, in the vicinity of Calea Floreasca, Barbu Văcărescu Boulevard and Pipera. The building has a total of 26 floors and a gross leasable area of 54,700 m^{2} (589,000 sq ft). The 118 m (387 ft) high building is the second tallest in Bucharest and Romania just under the 137 m (449 ft) Floreasca City Center's Sky Tower. The construction of the building started in 2014 and was completed in 2015 at a total cost of €60 million.

== See also ==
- List of tallest buildings in Romania
- List of buildings in Bucharest
- List of tallest buildings in Bucharest
