= The Mark (Bucharest) =

- Interactive map of the The Mark area

General information
- Status: Completed
- Type: Office building
- Location: Bucharest
- Coordinates: 44°26′46.8″N 26°4′50.6″E
- Groundbreaking: 2016
- Opening: 2019
- Cost: €66 million

Height
- Tip: 70 m (230 ft)

Technical details
- Floor count: 15
- Floor area: 24,000 m^{2} (260,000 sq ft)

Design and construction
- Architect: Chapman Taylor
- Developer: S Immo

The Mark, is a class A office building that is constructed in the north-western part of Bucharest in the vicinity of the Bucharest North railway station. The building has a total of 15 floors with three underground, one ground and 14 upground floors and a gross leasable area of 24,000 m^{2} (260,000 sq ft). At completion the 70 m (230 ft) high building is one of the tallest in Bucharest. The construction of the building started in March 2016 and was finished in 2019 at a total cost of €66 million.

The project was announced for development in 2012 but was put on hold soon after by its developer, the real estate branch of the Austrian Erste Group, due to other large construction works underwent in the area. The project also comprises a second smaller six floor office building named The Podium with a gross leasable area of around 21,500 m^{2} (231,000 sq ft).

== See also ==
- List of tallest buildings in Romania
