= Charles de Gaulle Square =

Square in Bucharest, Romania

Coordinates: 44°27′58″N 26°5′11″E

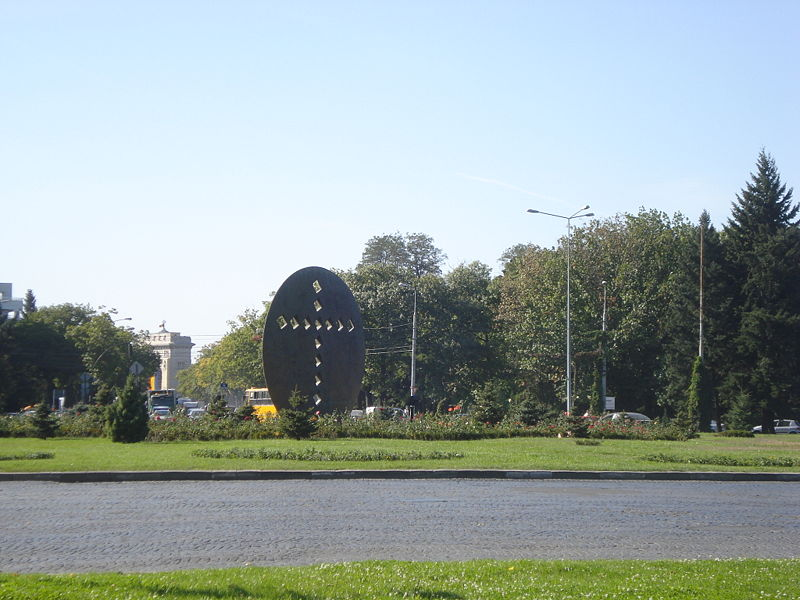
Millennium Cross in the Charles de Gaulle Square

Charles de Gaulle Square (Romanian: Piața Charles de Gaulle) is a square in northern Bucharest, Romania. It lies at the intersection of Aviatorilor, Constantin Prezan and Primăverii Boulevards, and Calea Dorobanților.

In the centre of the square stands Paul Neagu's Crucea Mileniului (Millennium Cross), built in the 1990s. In September 2006, on the occasion of the Francophonie Summit held in Bucharest, a statue of Charles de Gaulle was unveiled. Sculpted by Mircea Spătaru, it is 4.6 m (15 ft) high and was financed by the government.

During the Communist period of Romania, the square hosted parades in honor of the Revolution of 23 August 1944.

== Neighbourhood ==
Charles de Gaulle Square Business Center

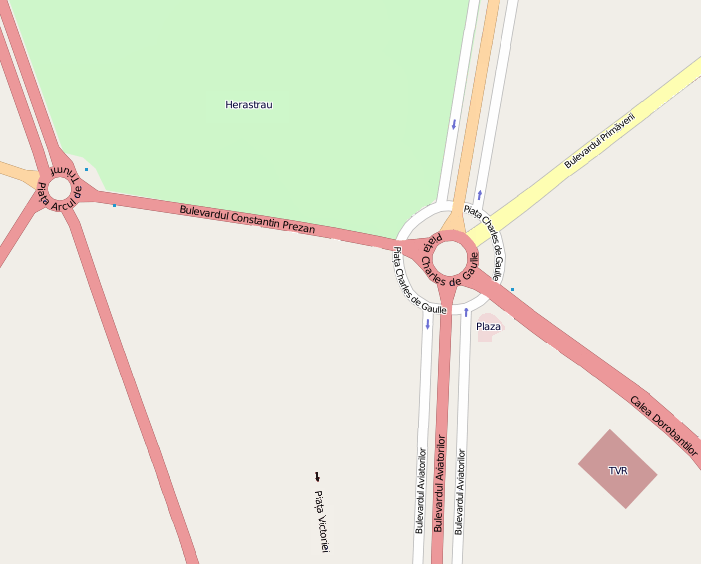
Overview of the area around the square

Regele Mihai I Park is located to the northwest of the square, Arcul de Triumf is located in its own square a few hundred metres to the west, on Constantin Prezan Boulevard, while Piața Victoriei, where the Romanian Government headquarters is situated, is located south, at the end of Aviatorilor Boulevard.

The state-owned Romanian Television is located about 100 metres (330 ft) to the southeast, on Calea Dorobanților. The Primăverii neighbourhood, which included the houses of the communist nomenklatura, is located to the northeast.

Charles de Gaulle Plaza, an office building inaugurated in 2004, is located in the southeastern part of the square and the Aviatorilor metro station is located right underneath the square, oriented from north to south.

== Name ==
The square was originally Piața Jianu, from Iancu Jianu, a haiduc (brigand) and folk hero who fought together with Tudor Vladimirescu in the 1821 Wallachian Revolution. In 1940 it was renamed Piața Adolf Hitler, but its original name was restored shortly after 23 August 1944, when Romania joined the Allies and turned against the Axis powers.

However, following the Soviet occupation of Romania, its name was changed in 1948 to Piața Generalissim I. V. Stalin, lasting until the early 1960s, when Romania began to assert a more independent foreign policy vis-à-vis the Soviet Union. A statue of Joseph Stalin stood in the square between 1951 until a summer night in 1962, when four tanks and twelve bulldozers removed it in several hours. The square was renamed Piața Aviatorilor, Aviators' Square.

Its final name change happened in the late 1990s, the square being renamed after Charles de Gaulle, the leader of the Free French Forces and first President of the French Fifth Republic.
