= Euro Tower (Bucharest) =

Office building in Romania

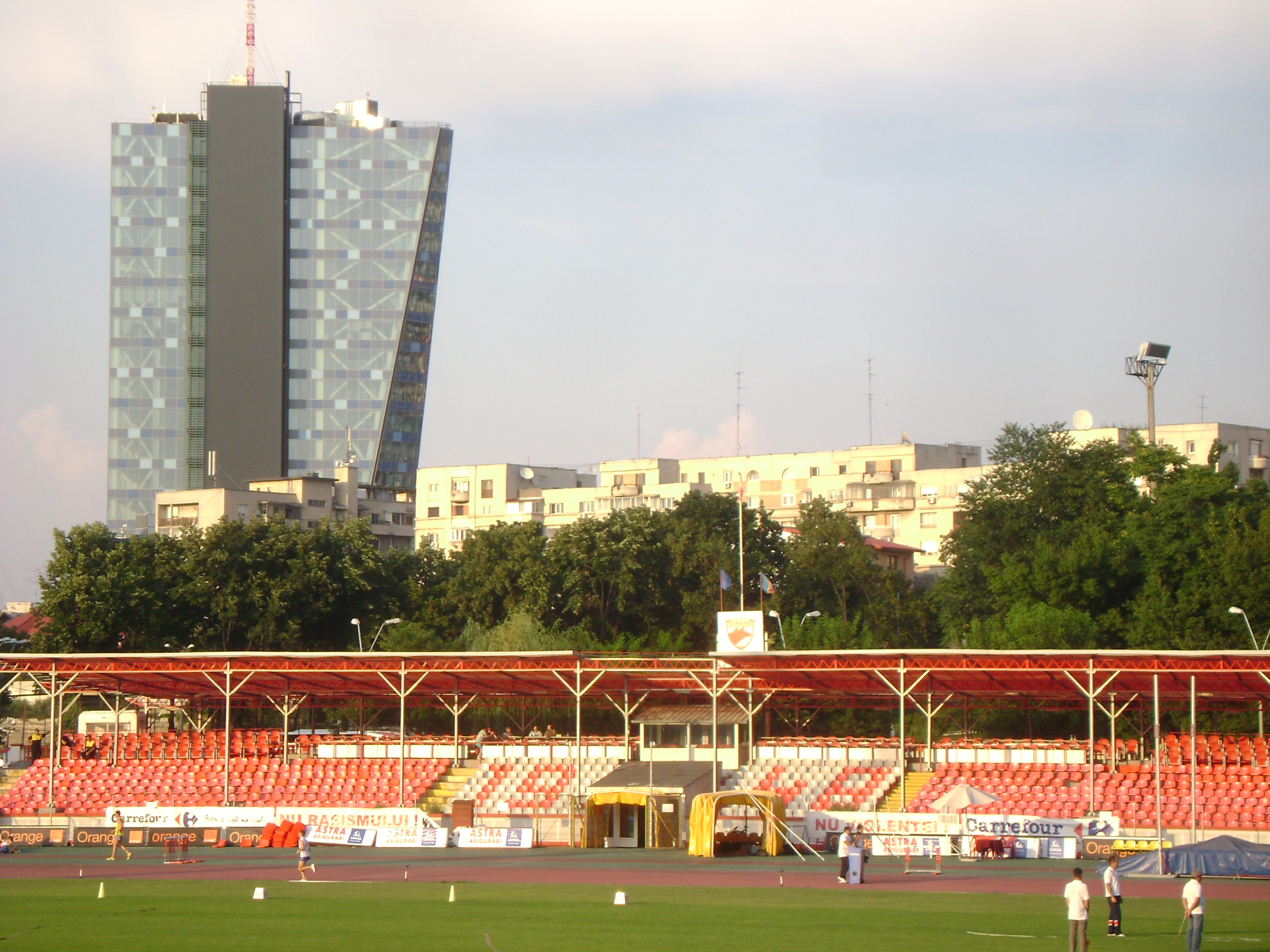
- Interactive map of the Euro Tower area

General information
- Status: Completed
- Location: Bucharest, Romania, Strada Dinu Vintilă 11, București sector 2, Romania
- Coordinates: 44.4570°N 26.1044°E
- Construction started: 2008
- Completed: 2010
- Cost: € 60,000,000
- Owner: Cascade Group

Height
- Roof: 92 m (302 ft)

Technical details
- Floor count: 18
- Floor area: 18,000 m^{2} (190,000 sq ft)

Design and construction
- Architects: Dorin Ștefan, Chapman Taylor architects
- Developer: Cascade Group
- Awards and prizes: BREEAM Green Building Certification

Euro Tower is a class A office building and the first Green building in Bucharest, awarded the BREEAM Post Construction Green Certificate. It has 18 floors and a floor area of 18,000 metres (59,000 ft). At a height of 92 metres (302 ft), the construction was finished in 2010.

== See also ==
- List of tallest buildings in Romania
- List of tallest buildings in Bucharest
