= Nusco Tower =

Office building in Bucharest, Romania

General information
- Status: Completed
- Location: Bucharest, Romania
- Construction started: 2008
- Opening: 2010
- Cost: €50 million
- Owner: Grupo Nusco

Height
- Roof: 80 m (260 ft)

Technical details
- Floor count: 20
- Floor area: 34,000 square metres (370,000 ft^{2})

The Nusco Tower is a class A office building located in Bucharest near the Aurel Vlaicu metro station at the intersection of Barbu Văcărescu street and Şoseaua Pipera. The building has a total of 20 floors and a floor area of 34,000 square metres (370,000 ft^{2}). The tower has a gross leasable area (GLA) of 17,000 m^{2} (180,000 ft^{2}). In August 2010 the American multinational computer technology company Oracle Corporation leased nearly 40% or 7,000 m^{2} (75,000 ft^{2}) of the tower.

== See also ==
- List of tallest buildings in Romania
