= Doamna Ghica Plaza =

- Interactive map of the Doamna Ghica Plaza area

General information
- Status: Completed
- Location: Bucharest, Romania
- Coordinates: 44.45182°N 26.14532°E
- Construction started: 2007
- Opening: 2009
- Owner: Romfelt Real Estate

Height
- Roof: 80 m (260 ft)

Technical details
- Floor count: 24
- Floor area: 132,000 m^{2} (1,420,000 sq ft)

Design and construction
- Architects: Vlad Simionescu & Associates
- Developer: Bog Art and Mota Engil
- Structural engineer: Interdraw

Doamna Ghica Plaza (Romfelt Plaza) is a large residential building complex located in Bucharest, Romania. The complex is composed of nine buildings with a total surface of 132,000 m^{2} (1,420,000 sq ft), the tallest tower having 24 floors and a height of 80 metres (260 ft).
