= Crystal Tower Bucharest =

Office building in Bucharest, Romania

Coordinates: 44.452586°N 26.09535°E

Crystal Tower
- Interactive map of the Crystal Tower area

General information
- Status: Completed
- Location: Bucharest, Romania
- Construction started: 2008
- Opening: 2011
- Cost: 35 million €
- Owner: Search Corporation

Height
- Roof: 72 m (236 ft)

Technical details
- Floor count: 15
- Floor area: 24,728 m^{2} (266,170 sq ft)

Crystal Tower is a class A office building located on the Lancu de Hunedoara Boulevard in Bucharest, Romania. The building has 15 floors, a height of 72 m (236 ft) and a surface of 24,728 m^{2} (266,170 sq ft). The Crystal Tower was the first private office building in Bucharest that was built with a heliport, and it serves as the headquarters of the Dutch banking group ING.
