= Cefin Tower =

General information
- Status: Proposed
- Location: Bucharest, Romania
- Cost: US$ 308,000,000
- Owner: Cefin Holding

Height
- Roof: 125 m (410 ft)

Technical details
- Floor count: 36
- Floor area: 40,000 m^{2} (430,000 sq ft)

Cefin Tower was a proposed class A office building in Bucharest, Romania, with 36 floors and a surface of 40,000 m^{2}. The building were to be part of an 85,000 m^{2} development that would have included a 5-star hotel and a commercial gallery.
