= Bucharest Corporate Center =

Coordinates: 44.447823°N 26.081841°E

- Interactive map of the Bucharest Corporate Center area

General information
- Status: Completed
- Location: Bucharest, Romania
- Construction started: 2005
- Opening: 2007
- Cost: US$ 20,000,000
- Owner: Assicurazioni Generali

Height
- Roof: 60 m (200 ft)

Technical details
- Floor count: 15
- Floor area: 18,000 m^{2} (190,000 sq ft)

Bucharest Corporate Center also known as the Generali Tower is a class A office building in Bucharest. It has 15 floors and a surface of 18,000 m^{2}. The building is owned by the real estate branch of insurance giants Assicurazioni Generali.

== See also ==
- List of tallest buildings in Romania
