= Lady's Church =

Heritage site in Bucharest, Romania

Coordinates: 44°26′04″N 26°05′56″E

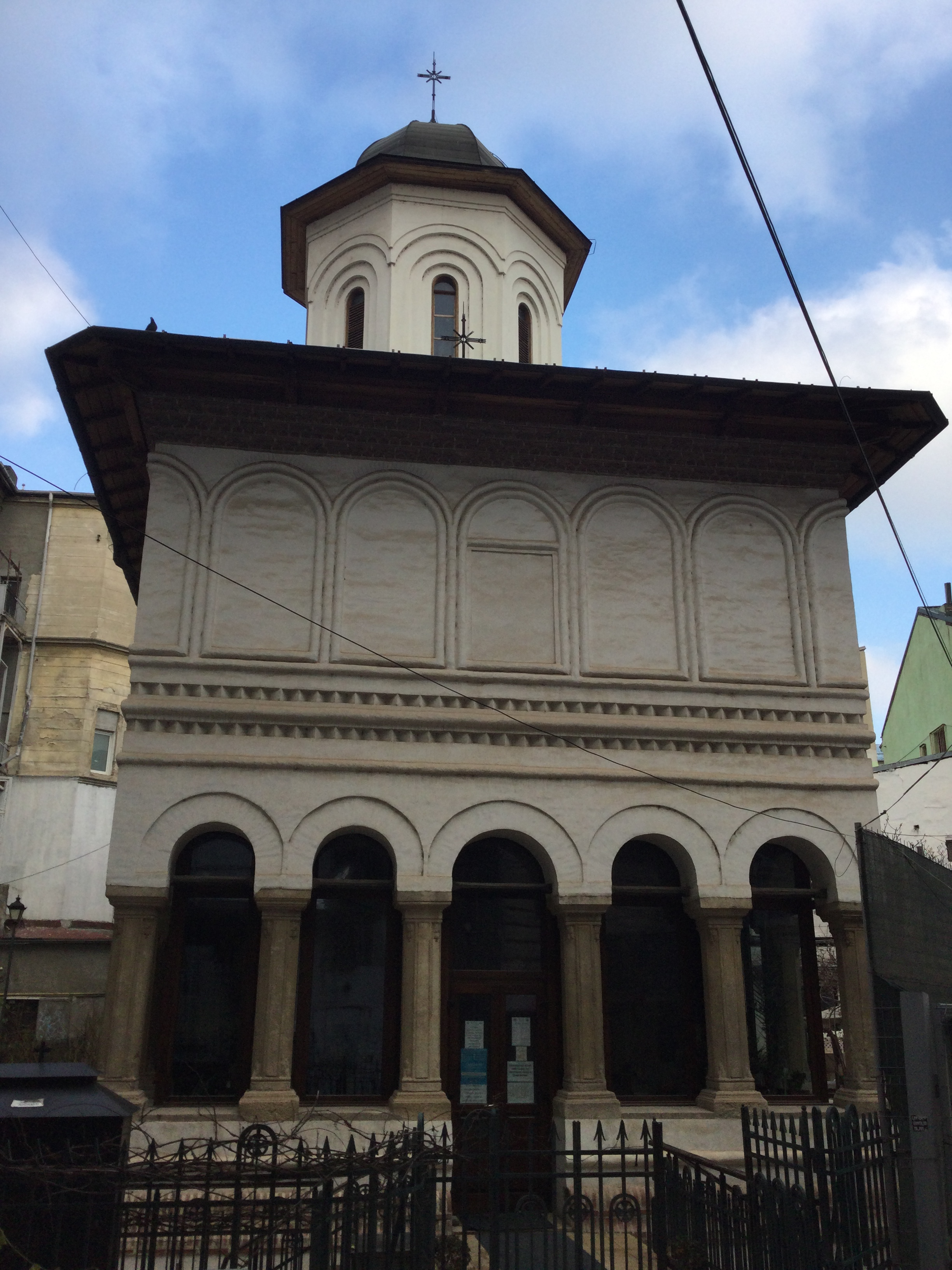
Lady's Church

The Lady's Church (Romanian: Biserica Doamnei) is a Romanian Orthodox church located at 1 Doamnei Street in Bucharest, Romania, hidden behind an apartment block on Calea Victoriei. It is dedicated to the Presentation of Mary.

== History ==
Successive churches were built on the site, which belonged in turn to the Mogoșești-Grădișteni, Craiovești and Cantacuzino families. In the 1950s, archaeological excavations unearthed the likely traces of an earlier church, as well as fifteen graves from the 15th through 18th centuries, attributed to an old churchyard. At one point, a wooden church stood there. It was re-founded by Lady Maria, the wife of Șerban Cantacuzino, probably before 1677, the earliest recorded mention of the parish and, indirectly, the church. A 1684 document explicitly mentions the church. The church was linked to the large houses that Șerban built nearby, and was intended as a chapel for a future princely court. As attested by the pisanie, it was rebuilt in masonry by Maria in 1683.

In 1689, Maria dedicated the church to Cotroceni Monastery, of which her husband was ktetor. The building was damaged during the earthquakes of 1802, 1827, 1829 and 1838. Photographs taken in the mid-1850s by an Austrian soldier, part of an Imperial Austrian Army occupying the area during the Crimean War, reveal that the original bell tower remained, while only the base of the Pantocrator dome is visible, covered in tin. Soon afterward, and before 1868, the church underwent a radical repair, the bell tower being demolished and replaced by a wood and tin one. Another repair took place in 1869, followed by a renovation in 1906. Declared a historic monument in 1915, it underwent maintenance work between 1920; and 1951. Not being greatly affected by the 1940 earthquake, the repairs were minor. Further work took place after the 1977 earthquake, and an ample restoration was undertaken between 1998 and 2004.

== Description ==
The church is shaped like a rectangular ship, typical of princely court chapels. It has very thick walls and measures 26.5 meters wide by 9 meters long, rising to a height of 9.3 meters at the pediment. Entry is made through the portico open along the entire western facade; the bell tower rises above the narthex. The portico has five frontal arches and two on each side; these rest on stone columns with octagonal pillars, also found in several other churches from the reign of Șerban Cantacuzino. The bases and capitals are carved with ornamental motifs of Middle Eastern origin. The door, leading into the narthex, is carved with floral designs. The 1683 pisanie sits above, complete with an eagle, the symbol of Wallachia. The narthex is nearly square and has a spherical ceiling. The original base of the octagonal bell tower is square, with a large gutter; the structure linking base and tower is typical of the late 17th century. Three arches on octagonal columns lead to the nave.

The extended nave features a vaulted ceiling. The Pantocrator dome was demolished at some point between 1802-1838 and 1854–1856; for some time, only the original base remained on the exterior, above which a bell-shaped protective roof was mounted. The altar apse is semicircular on the interior and seven-sided on the exterior, fairly rare for the period. The original fresco, done in a harmony of red, black and gold, was restored in the 1970s. The exterior was plastered from the beginning, but for a long time, this was removed and the inner layer of brick exposed. In 2003, the facades were again covered in plaster and painted white, leaving visible two distinct halves, upper and lower. The former has a series of arched panels. The two are divided by a string course with two rows of sawtooth-like bricks. The original lower windows have stone frames in Moldavian style; above, there are eight small windows. The structure is surrounded by a strong brick base, which was one meter below ground level when it was uncovered and restored in 2004.

The church is listed as a historic monument by Romania's Ministry of Culture and Religious Affairs.
