= Rin Grand Hotel =

Residential Complex in Bucharest, Romania

RIN Grand Residence

General information
- Status: Completed
- Location: Bucharest, Romania
- Coordinates: 44.39862°N 26.14354°E
- Construction started: 2006
- Opening: 2008
- Closed: 17 January 2022
- Cost: €60,000,000
- Owner: RIN Group

Height
- Roof: 65 m (213 ft)

Technical details
- Floor count: 15
- Floor area: 115,000 m^{2} (1,240,000 sq ft)

RIN Grand Residence is a residential complex located in the Vitan area in Bucharest, Romania. It is located in South–East Bucharest, 6 kilometres (3.7 mi) from one of the largest squares in Europe, Piața Unirii (Union Square), and close to the commercial and historical centers and the București Mall, one of the biggest and most-visited malls in the city.

It was formerly known as RIN Grand Hotel, the fifth-largest hotel in Europe and the largest hotel in the European Union in terms of room count, having a total of 1,459 rooms. The modern building has two underground floors and 16 overground floors and a constructed surface area of 115,000 m^{2} (1,240,000 sq ft).

== Construction ==
At first, the hotel was intended to have 1,000 rooms and the building, only 11 floors and the cost would have been around €30 million. But with the demolition of the Rossiya Hotel in 2006, which was the second-largest hotel in Europe at the time with 3,182 rooms, the developers saw an opportunity to construct an even larger hotel than initially envisioned and thus the hotel was upgraded to 1,459 rooms and the building heightened to 15 floors. The construction of the Rin Grand Hotel started in 2006 on a 4 ha (9.9 acres) plot of land located in Southern Bucharest in the Vitan area where no major hotel existed at the time. The first 630 rooms were finished in October 2007 and the rest of the 1,459 rooms were finished in March 2008 in time for the 20th NATO Summit held in Bucharest; its invitees occupied 900 rooms. The 115,000 m^{2} (1,240,000 sq ft) hotel was built at a cost of €60 million and is owned by the RIN Group.

== Facilities ==
The RIN Grand Hotel had 1,459 rooms spread over 12 floors. The hotel also had 25 conference rooms with capacities ranging from 18 to 1,000 seats, with the largest having 1,200 m^{2} (13,000 sq ft). Its three restaurants included La Boema, which had a capacity of 210 people, and Stars, with a capacity of 650 people. The hotel also featured a 1,000 places parking, a 1,500 m^{2} (16,000 sq ft) shopping gallery with 27 outlet stores and an Olympic-size swimming pool.

In 2023 the hotel was converted into residential apartments.

== History ==
During his stay in Romania, the first President of Ghana, Kwame Nkrumah, lived at the Rin Grand Hotel, known then as the Flamingo Hotel. He died there on April 27, 1972, at age 66.

== See also ==
- List of tallest buildings in Romania
