= French Church (Bucharest) =

Roman Catholic church in Bucharest, Romania

Coordinates: 44°27′35.56″N 26°5′12.22″E

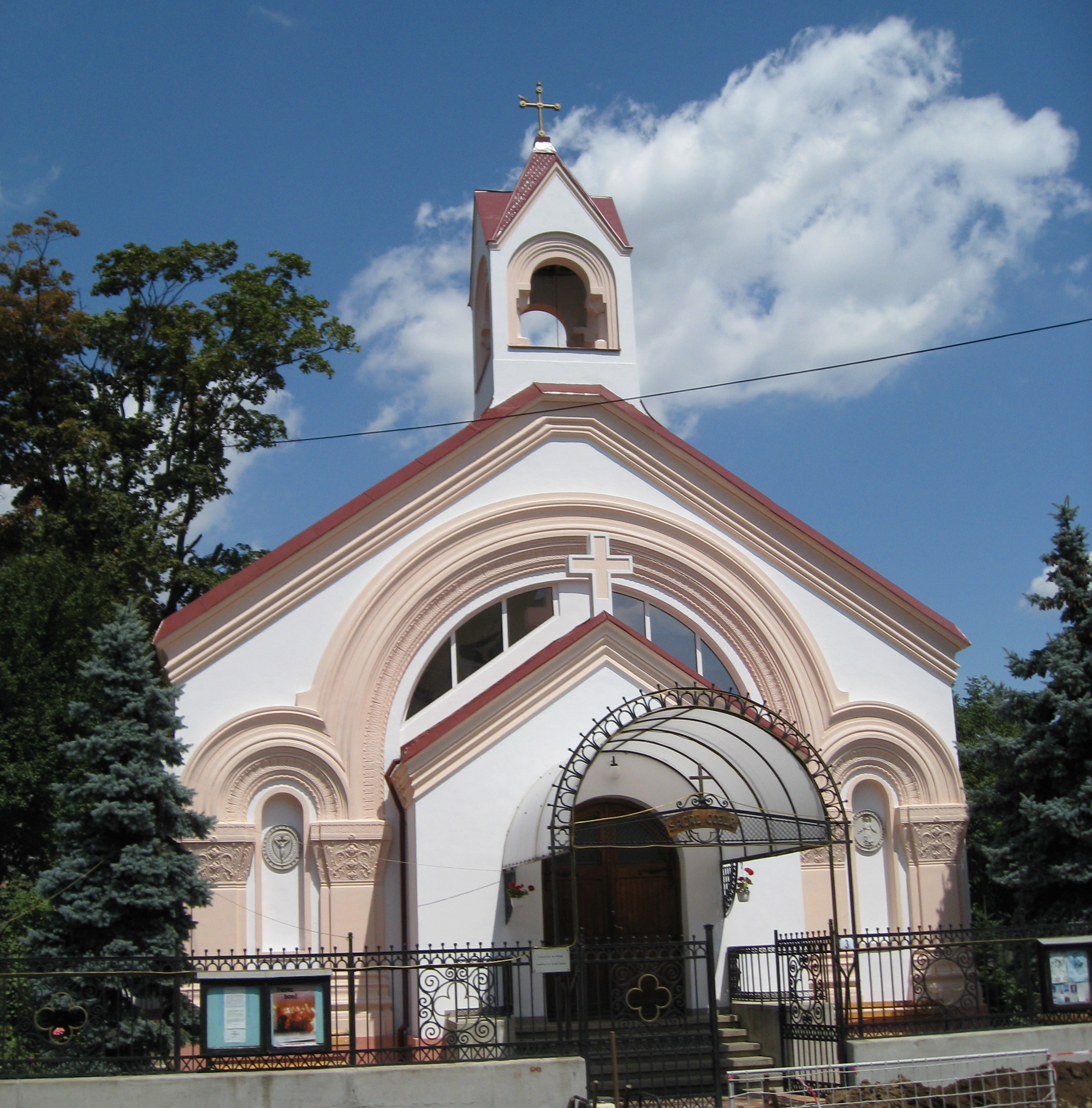
French Church, Bucharest

The French Church of the Sacred Heart (Romanian: Biserica Franceză "Sacré-Cœur") is a Roman Catholic parish church located at 3 Gheorghe Demetriade Street, Bucharest, Romania. It is classified as a historic monument by the Ministry of Culture and Religious Affairs.

In the spring of 1906, Monsignor Vladimir Ghika, working with Sister Elisabeta Pucci, whom he had called from Thessaloniki, began work on a building for the Daughters of Charity of Saint Vincent de Paul on land donated by Maria Pâcleanu. In 1922, work began on the Saint Vincent de Paul Sanatorium, inside of which there was a chapel where masses were held until 1930. Additionally, there was a chapel in Pâcleanu's adjacent residence. In 1930, next to the sanatorium's eastern wall, the Daughters of Charity built the parish church, with the altar facing north.

On November 12, 1946, the C. I. Parhon Endocrinology Institute was established in the building of the sanatorium. Thus, the area retained a charitable focus, but the church was closed in 1957, a decade into the Communist regime; all charitable activity "by superiors for the poor, orphans and the sick" had been outlawed. On rare occasions, services were held for foreign delegations passing through the country. On December 1, 1991, following the collapse of Communism, the church was reopened, and the parish re-established. In 2004, fifty years after he died a political prisoner in Jilava Prison, a statue depicting Ghika was placed on a square near the church. As of 2009, the parish has nearly 2,000 members, and services are regularly held in Romanian, French, English, Latin and Arabic.

The church is in the style of a basilica, with three naves preceded by a small vestibule. The central nave is 6 metres (20 ft) wide and has a slightly vaulted ceiling. The others are lower, have flat ceilings, are 3 m wide and are each separated by four square-shaped pillars with Byzantine-style capitals. An extension of the central nave, marked by an arch, features the apse, which has stained-glass windows and a horizontal ceiling. The choir is above the entry into the nave, and there is a small organ to the right of the entrance. Light comes in through large, rectangular windows adorned in stained glass with floral Art Nouveau motifs. The walls and ceilings are painted without decoration. Fourteen bas-relief panels on the walls depict the Stations of the Cross.

The exterior is painted simply, in white. The roof has two slopes and is covered in terracotta tiles. Above the roof, behind the entrance facade, there is a small tower with square sides. This has four small, open three-lobed arches, and sharp-angled pediments on each side. On top is a cross and a Gallic rooster. The vestibule is lower, also has a two-sloped roof, and a rounded door. It is located on the southern side before the main facade and provides entry into the church. On either side are two niches surrounded by multiple arches in relief.
