= Piraeus Bank Tower Bucharest =

Piraeus Bank Tower

General information
- Status: Completed
- Location: Bucharest, Romania
- Opening: 2009
- Owner: Piraeus Bank

Height
- Roof: 64 m (210 ft)

Technical details
- Floor count: 15
- Floor area: 14,321 m^{2} (154,150 sq ft)

Design and construction
- Architect: Stelios Agiostratitis

Piraeus Bank Tower is a large office building located in the city of Bucharest, Romania. It stands at a height of 64 meters and has a total of 15 floors, with a total surface area of 14,321 m^{2} (154,150 sq ft). The Romanian headquarters of the Greek Piraeus Bank is located in this building.
