= Charles de Gaulle Plaza =

Office building in Bucharest, Romania

- Location within Romania

General information
- Status: Completed
- Type: Office building
- Location: Bucharest, Romania
- Coordinates: 44.4653°N 26.0874°E
- Completed: 2003
- Opening: 2005
- Cost: US$ 50.000.000
- Owner: Avrig 35

Height
- Roof: 70 m (230 ft)

Technical details
- Floor count: 17
- Floor area: over 23,000 m^{2} (250,000 sq ft)
- Lifts/elevators: Four panoramic elevators

Design and construction
- Architect: Westfourth Architecture
- Developer: Avrig 35
- Engineer: Emanuel E. Necula, Consulting Engineers P.C.
- Main contractor: BogArt

Charles de Gaulle Plaza is a "class A" office building in the Charles de Gaulle Square, Bucharest, Romania. It is constructed entirely out of concrete, steel and glass. It has 16 floors and a gross lettable area of 22,000 m^{2} (240,000 sq ft). There are an additional five floors underground that serve as a parking space with 350 places. The elevators are the fastest in Romania having a speed of 2.5 m/s (8.2 ft/s).

== See also ==
- List of tallest buildings in Romania
