= Phoenix Tower, Bucharest =

Phoenix Tower
- Interactive map of the Phoenix Tower area

General information
- Status: Completed
- Location: Bucharest, Romania
- Coordinates: 44.4228°N 26.1208°E
- Construction started: 2004
- Opening: 2006
- Cost: US$ 25,000,000
- Owner: Allianz

Height
- Roof: 65 m (213 ft)

Technical details
- Floor count: 15
- Floor area: 11,500 m^{2} (124,000 sq ft)

Design and construction
- Developer: MT&T Property & Facility Management

Website
- www.phoenix-tower.ro

Phoenix Tower (formerly PGV Tower) is a class A office building located in the city of Bucharest, Romania. It stands at a height of 65 meters and has 15 floors, with a total surface of 11,500 square metres. The building is owned by DEGI, the real estate branch of insurance giants Allianz.
