= Millennium Business Center =

Office building in Bucharest, Romania

- Millennium Business Center in 2008
- Interactive map of the Millennium Business Center area

General information
- Status: Completed
- Location: Bucharest, Romania
- Coordinates: 44°26′14″N 26°06′36″E
- Construction started: 2001
- Opening: 2006
- Renovated: 2009
- Cost: $35.000.000

Height
- Roof: 72 m (236 ft)

Technical details
- Floor count: 19
- Floor area: 26,600 m^{2} (286,000 sq ft)

Design and construction
- Developer: Millennium Estate

Millennium Business Center is a class A office building located in the city of Bucharest, Romania. It stands at a height of 72 meters (approx. 236 feet) and has 19 floors, with a total surface of 26,600 m^{2}.

== Fire on June 27, 2009 ==
Damage to tower following 2009 fire

Around 11:00 PM on June 26, 2009, the building was engulfed in flames after a large billboard near the building exploded, most likely because it was struck by lightning. Two hours later, at 1:10 AM on June 27, around 150 firefighters from Sector 2 (Bucharest) were still trying to stop the fire, although the main source of the fire had already been taken care of.
