= Griro Tower =

Office building in Bucharest, Romania

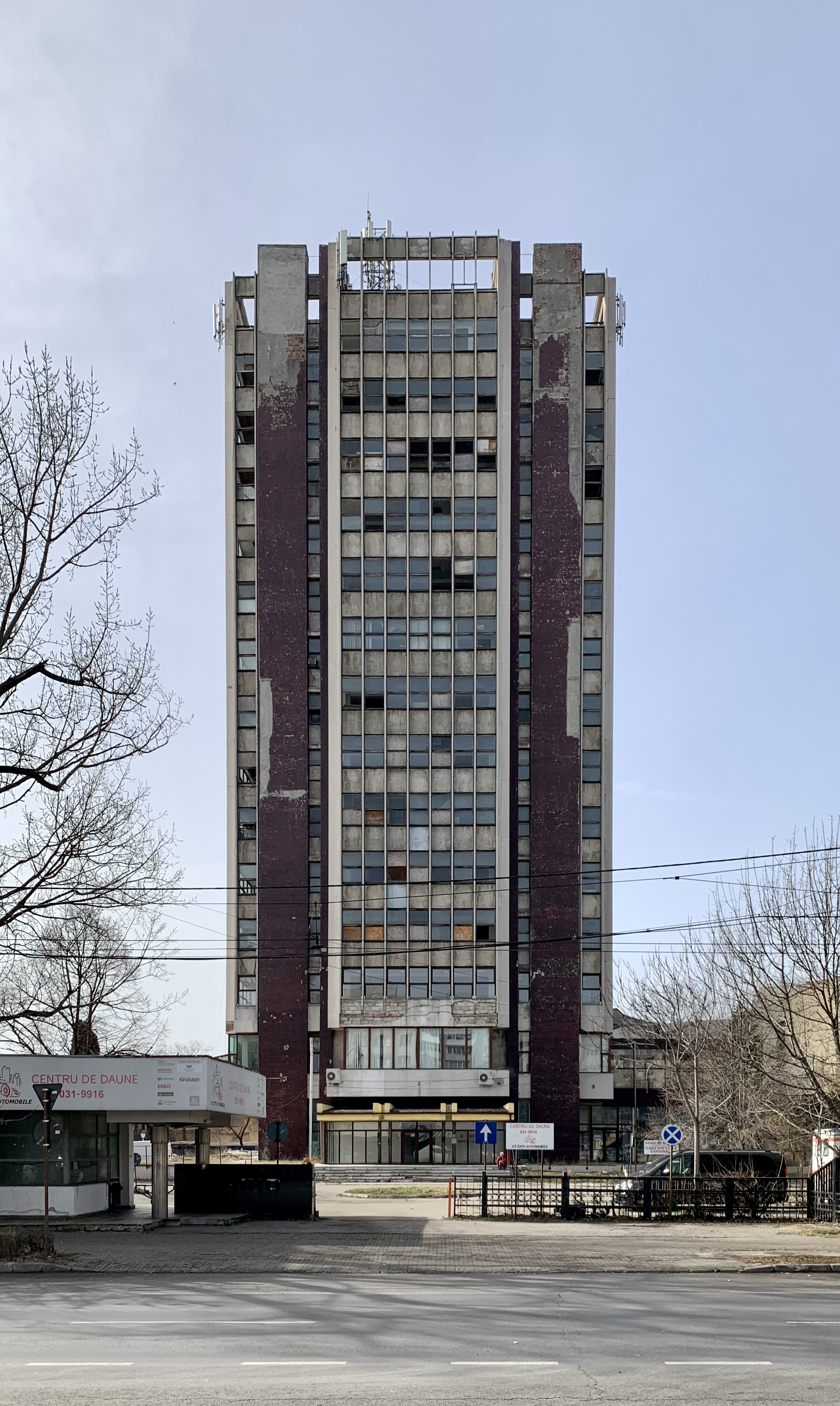

General information
- Status: Completed
- Location: Bucharest, Romania
- Construction started: 1982
- Opening: 1984

Height
- Roof: 60 m (200 ft)

Technical details
- Floor count: 15
- Floor area: 10,000 m^{2} (110,000 sq ft)

Griro Tower is an office building located in Bucharest. It has 15 floors and a surface of 10,000 m^{2}.
