= Bucharest Tower Center =

Class A office building in Bucharest

Tower Center International
- Bucharest Tower Center
- Interactive map of the Tower Center International area

General information
- Type: Office building
- Location: Bucharest, Romania
- Coordinates: 44°27′16″N 26°04′52″E
- Completed: 2008
- Owner: Globalworth

Height
- Roof: 106.3 metres (349 ft)

Technical details
- Floor count: 26
- Floor area: 31,000 m^{2} (333,681 sq ft)
- Lifts/elevators: 6

Design and construction
- Architect: Westfourth Architecture
- Developer: Tower Center International/Avrig35
- Engineer: Emanuel E. Necula, Consulting Engineers PC
- Main contractor: Bog’Art SRL

Tower Center International is a class A office building in Bucharest. It has 26 floors, with a total of 31,000 m^{2} (330,000 sq ft) floor space. It is located near Victory Square, or 1 Mai zone. At a height of 106.3 m (349 ft), it is also the 4th tallest building in Bucharest, as well as in Romania.

The original building project had 21 storey floors and 3 level basement, however, the constructor has built one more floor. The city hall has stopped the works to remake the permit.

The structure has a height regime of 3S + P + 22/f + 3Etehn. At the basis, the building has a plan size of 42.0 m × 24.8 m (137.8 ft × 81.4 ft). The upper level at the 22nd floor is 94.3 m (309 ft), and at the level of the last technical floor is 106.3 m (349 ft).

== See also ==
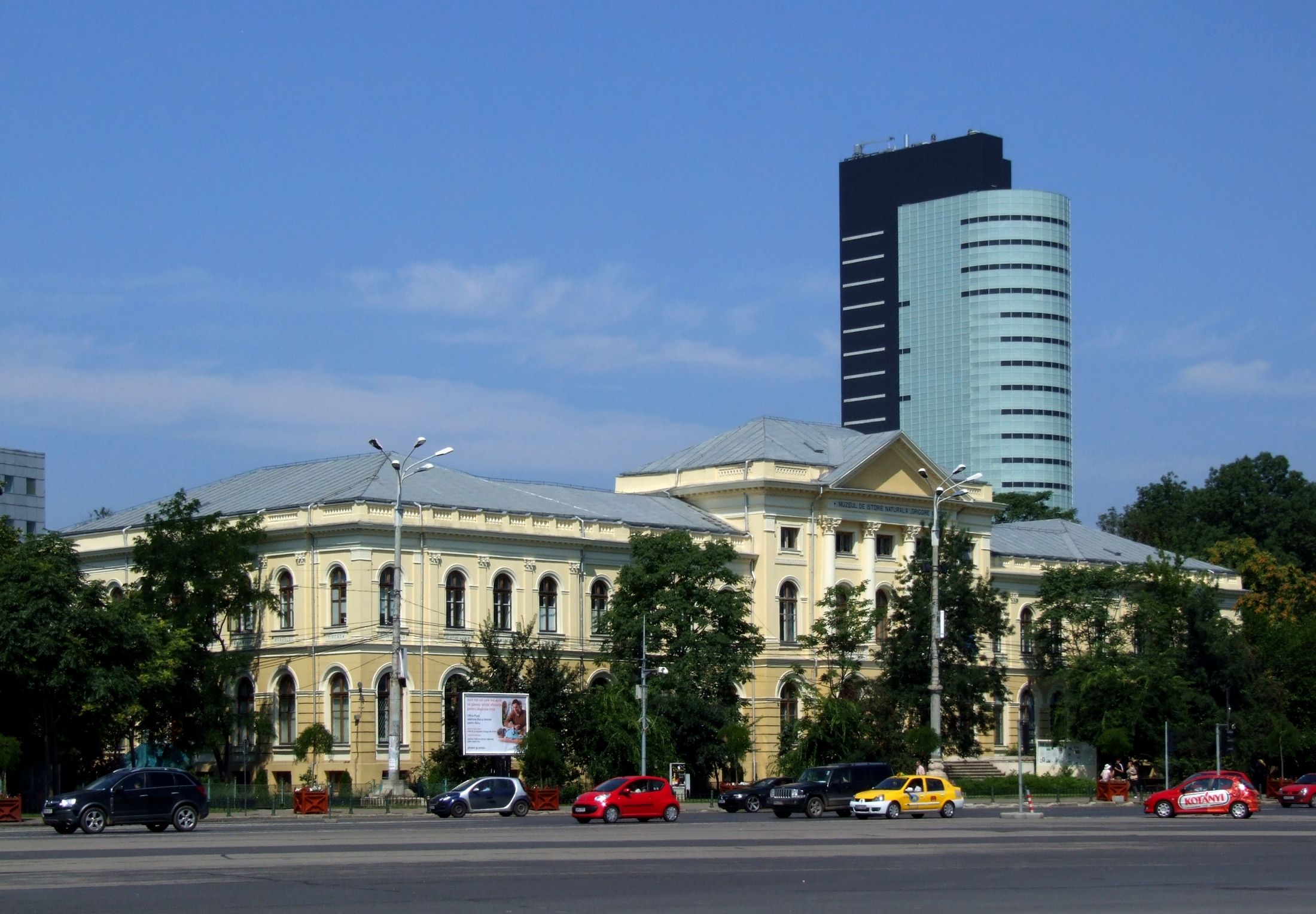
Tower Center (at right) with Grigore Antipa National Museum of Natural History in foreground

- List of tallest buildings in Romania
