= Premium Plaza =

Office building in Bucharest, Romania

- Premium Plaza
- Interactive map of the Premium Plaza area

General information
- Status: Completed
- Location: Bucharest, Romania
- Coordinates: 44.4519°N 26.0786°E
- Construction started: 2006
- Opening: 2007
- Cost: US$ 28.000.000
- Owner: Premiumred Real Estate

Height
- Roof: 64 m (210 ft)

Technical details
- Floor count: 15
- Floor area: 8,700 m^{2} (94,000 sq ft)

Premium Plaza is a class A office building located in the city of Bucharest, Romania. The building was opened in 2007. It stands at a height of 64 meters and has 15 floors, with a net area of 8,645 m^{2}. It is also equipped with 50 underground parking spaces.
