= Asmita Gardens =

Residential complex in Bucharest, Romania

- Interactive map of the Asmita Gardens area

General information
- Status: Completed
- Location: Bucharest, Romania
- Coordinates: 44.40709°N 26.12449°E
- Construction started: 2007
- Opening: 2009
- Cost: US$250,000,000
- Owner: Asmita Group

Height
- Roof: 64 to 92.2 m (210 to 302 ft)

Technical details
- Floor count: 16 to 25
- Floor area: 70,000 m^{2} (750,000 sq ft)

Asmita Gardens is a residential complex located in Bucharest. The complex has a total surface of 70,000 m^{2} (750,000 sq ft) and is formed by a total of seven towers, five of which have a height of 16 floors (64 m), one tower with a height of 20 floors (80 m), and one tower with a height of 25 floors. At 92.2 m (302 ft), the 25 floor tower T3 is the tallest residential building in Bucharest.

The first three towers (5, 6 and 7) which have a city view were completed in April 2009, and the other four towers (1, 2, 3 and 4), 2×16 fl, 1×20 fl and 1×25 fl, which have a river view were completed in September 2009.

As of April 2016, 444 apartments were sold and 314 were still available.
