= Cathedral Plaza Bucharest =

Cathedral Plaza
- Cathedral Plaza

General information
- Status: Completed
- Type: Office Building
- Location: Bucharest, Romania
- Coordinates: 44.44200°N 26.09181°E
- Construction started: 2005
- Completed: 2010
- Opening: 2011
- Cost: US $38,000,000

Height
- Roof: 75 m (246 ft)

Technical details
- Floor count: 19
- Floor area: 23,000 m^{2} (250,000 sq ft)

Design and construction
- Architect: Westfourth SA
- Developer: SC Millennium Building Development SRL
- Main contractor: BogArt SA

Cathedral Plaza is a construction office building in Bucharest, Romania, close to the Saint Joseph Cathedral. It has 19 floors and a surface of 23,000 m^{2}. At a height of 75 m (246 ft), the structure was finished in 2010, but the building was never opened because allegedly it lacks proper permits.

The building was deemed to be illegal and ordered to be demolished in 2011 by the Suceava Court of Appeals. The demolition order was issued in July 2022.

At present, the building was not demolished because The European Court of Human Rights confirmed that the entry into legality of the building has priority over the demolition.

It follows from the ECHR decision that the domestic legal proceedings concerning the administrative regularization of the Cathedral Plaza building initiated by the owner Millennium take precedence over the demolition claims brought by ARCB. The Romanian authorities are under an obligation to ensure a fair balance between the rights of Millennium, as the owner of a building worth more than EUR 70 million and entitled to have the situation of its building regularized in accordance with domestic rules, and those of ARCB.
