= Bucharest Financial Plaza =

Office building in Bucharest, Romania

- Bucharest Financial Plaza

General information
- Status: Completed
- Location: 15 Calea Victoriei, Bucharest, Romania
- Coordinates: 44°25′58″N 26°05′48″E
- Construction started: 1994
- Opening: 1997
- Cost: US$ 30,000,000
- Owner: AFI Europe

Height
- Roof: 83 m (272 ft)

Technical details
- Floor count: 18
- Floor area: 30,000 m^{2} (320,000 sq ft)

Bucharest Financial Plaza is a class A office building in the city of Bucharest, Romania. It has 18 floors, with a total of 30,000 m^{2} of floor space. It also has 3 underground floors which are used as parking spaces for 160 cars. Bucharest Financial Plaza is one of the tallest office buildings in Bucharest, standing at a height 83 metres. Completed in 1997, it was initially the headquarters of Bancorex, which went bankrupt two years later.

In August 2024, AFI Europe bought the building for 27.5 million dollars. Following the purchase, the building is set to be modified and modernized, while partly demolishing some parts of the building. The new concept features reducing the number of floors in the wing near the Calea Victoriei avenue, increasing the visibility of the nearby historical monuments.
