= City Gate Towers =

Office buildings in Bucharest, Romania

- Turnurile "Porțile Orașului"
- Interactive map of the City Gate Towers area

General information
- Status: Completed
- Location: Bucharest, Romania
- Coordinates: 44.47778°N 26.07117°E
- Construction started: 2007
- Opening: 2010
- Cost: $100,000,000 USD
- Owner: Globe Trade Centre S.A. (GTC)

Height
- Roof: 72 m (236 ft)

Technical details
- Floor count: 18
- Floor area: 1,100 m^{2} (12,000 sq ft) each

Design and construction
- Architect: Westfourth Architecture
- Structural engineer: Popp & Asociații

City Gate Towers (Romanian: Turnurile "Porțile Orașului") are two class A office buildings located in Bucharest, Romania. The two 18-story buildings stand at a height of 72 metres (236 ft), and have a total surface of 47,700 m^{2} (22,350 m^{2} each). The buildings are also equipped with 1,000 parking spaces.
