= Dâmbovița Center =

Building in Bucharest, Romania

Dâmbovița Center Towers
- Interactive map of the Dâmbovița Center Towers area

General information
- Status: On hold
- Type: Shopping Mall, Office, Hotel
- Location: Bucharest, Romania
- Coordinates: 44.4374°N 26.0752°E

Height
- Roof: 155.4 m (510 ft)

Technical details
- Floor count: 35
- Floor area: 100,000 m^{2} (1,100,000 sq ft)

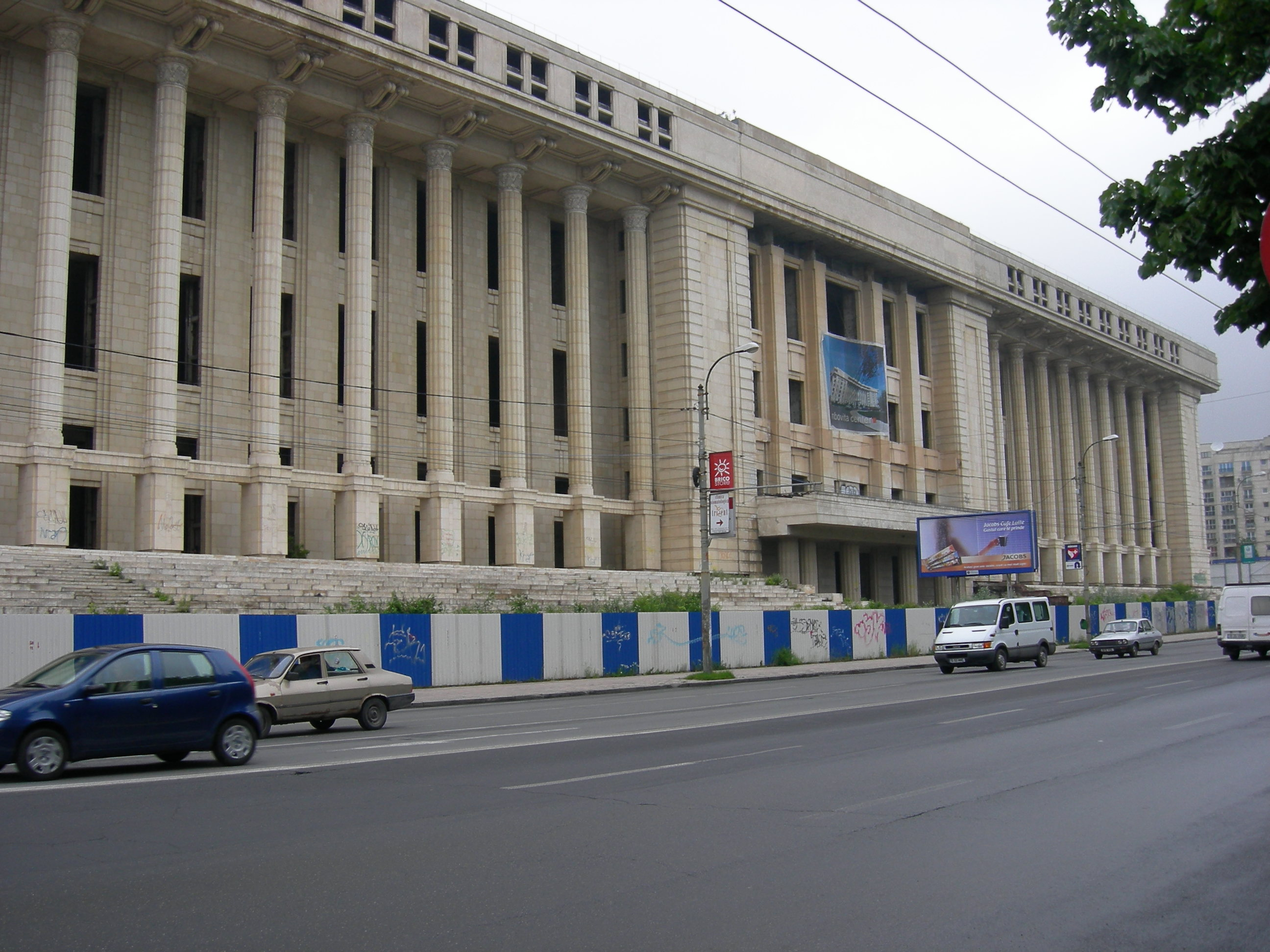
Casa Radio

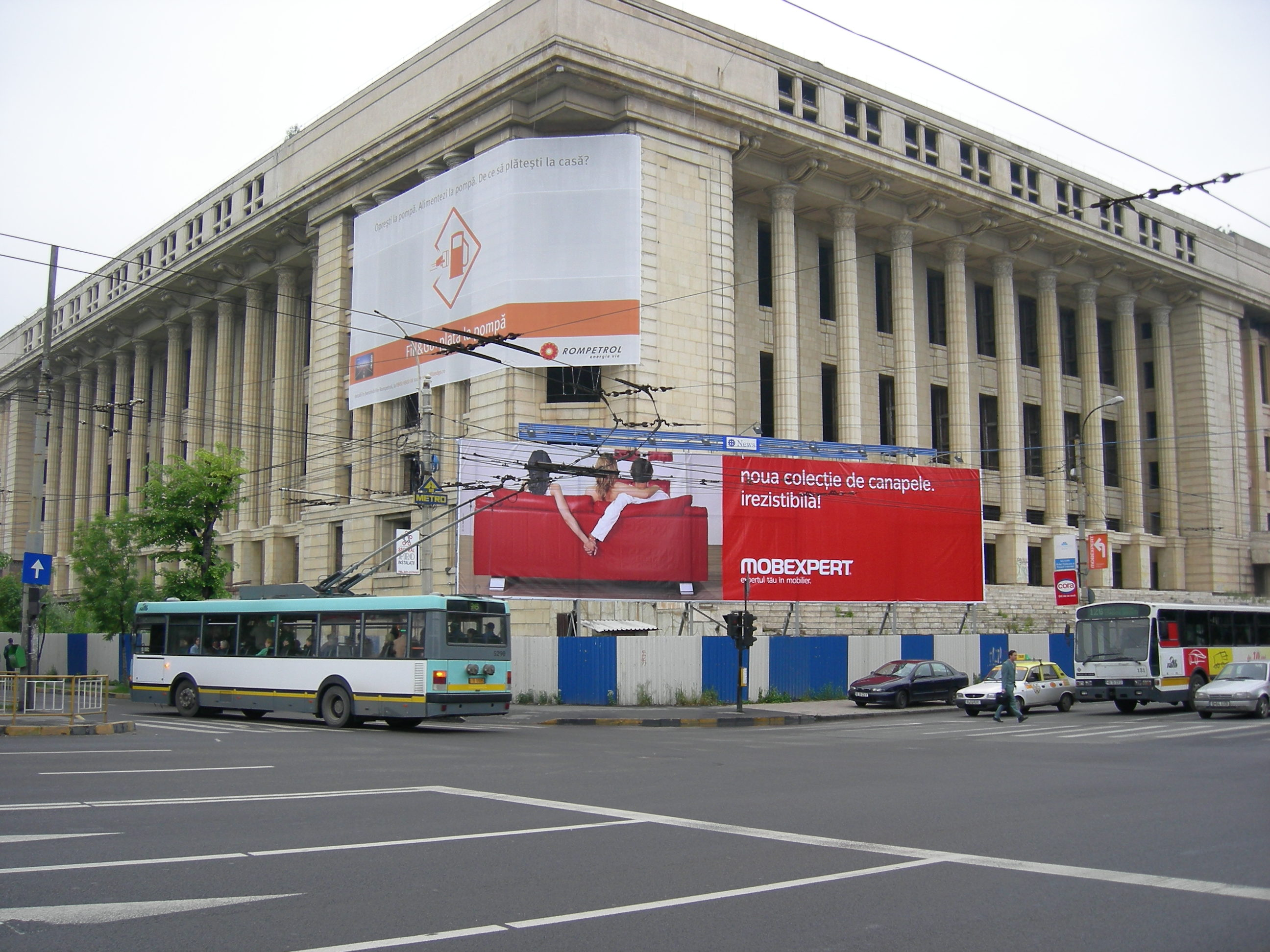
Another view of the unfinished Casa Radio

The Dâmbovița Center (also named Casa Radio) is an unfinished skyscraper in Bucharest, Romania, near Cotroceni, on the shore of the Dâmbovița River. Casa Radio (meaning Radio House) was erected during the late 1980s by the Communist regime on land that, before the Second World War, was the location of the Bucharest Hippodrome. The building was intended to serve as the National Museum of History (Muzeul Național de Istorie) of the Socialist Republic of Romania. The balcony (which no longer exists) of the unfinished building facing Știrbei Vodă Street was used by the Romanian dictator Nicolae Ceaușescu on 23 August 1989 to watch the festivities marking Romania's National Day. It was the last Communist-style parade in Romania.

== Reimagination ==
The Romanian government contracted the construction of a hotel and mall called "Dâmbovița Center" to the Turkish company Cenk Vefa Kucuk. The project was supposed to be a $275 million investment and the largest multipurpose complex in the region. It was supposed to build a 300-room hotel, 69,000 m^{2} of retail space, 16,000 m^{2} of offices, 45,000 m^{2} of commercial galleries and a residential complex designed to include 200 apartments, a parking lot, restaurants and a hospital. The government, which provided the building, would receive 10% of the income.

The government canceled the contract in 2005 due to irregularities surrounding the auction, the company, and financing. The company stated it would sue to recover the money already invested.

In the winter of 2006, a public-private partnership agreement between Elbit Medical Imaging, an Israeli company, and the Romanian government was announced for the development of Casa Radio. The Romanian Government would remain a 15% partner in the scheme. Construction began in June 2007, after a decision to demolish 70% of the initial building, keeping only the façade and the structural framework.

The new project consisted of a mall of 100,000 m^{2} (1,100,000 sq ft), a five star hotel with 320 rooms, a residential area with 300 apartments and three office towers of 26, 30 and 34 floors, with the last tower having 155 m (509 ft).

Plaza Centers, the developer of Casa Radio in Bucharest, entered judicial reorganization in 2013 under the protection of the Dutch bankruptcy law, the Israeli investor Mordechay Zisser announced. Plaza Centers intended to invest in Romania in projects with a total value of nearly EUR 2 billion, the largest of projects being Dâmbovița Center, built on the 600,000 m^{2} (6,500,000 sq ft) platform of Casa Radio. In July 2014, Plaza Centers successfully completed debt restructuring and emerged from reorganization proceeding, and after 2014 it sold Kragujevac Plaza in Serbia and a shopping center in India.

The development of Casa Radio comprises approximately 467,000 m^{2} (5,030,000 sq ft) of built area, including a 90,000 m^{2} (970,000 sq ft) GLA shopping mall and indoor leisure center, approximately 127,000 m^{2} (1,370,000 sq ft) GBA of offices, hotel complex with conference center and underground car parking spaces. The Company Plaza Centers expected to complete the first phase of the project, which includes the shopping center, parking and PAB, in 2017.
