= List of tallest structures in Romania =

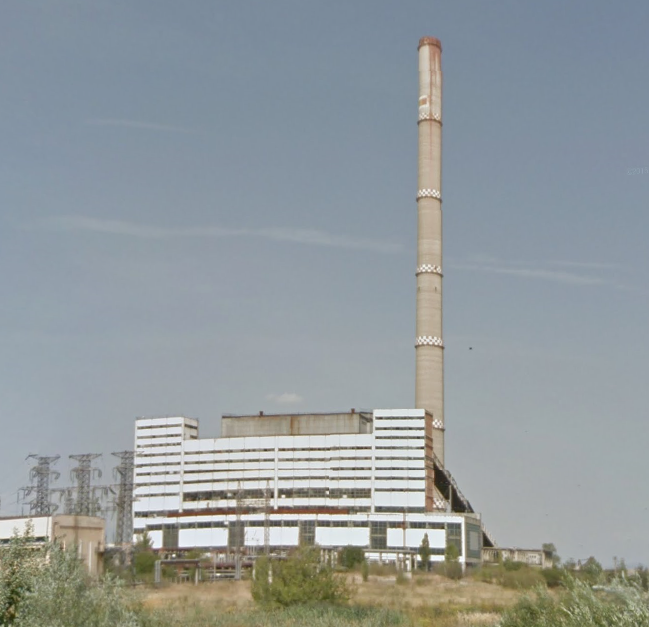
CET Brașov

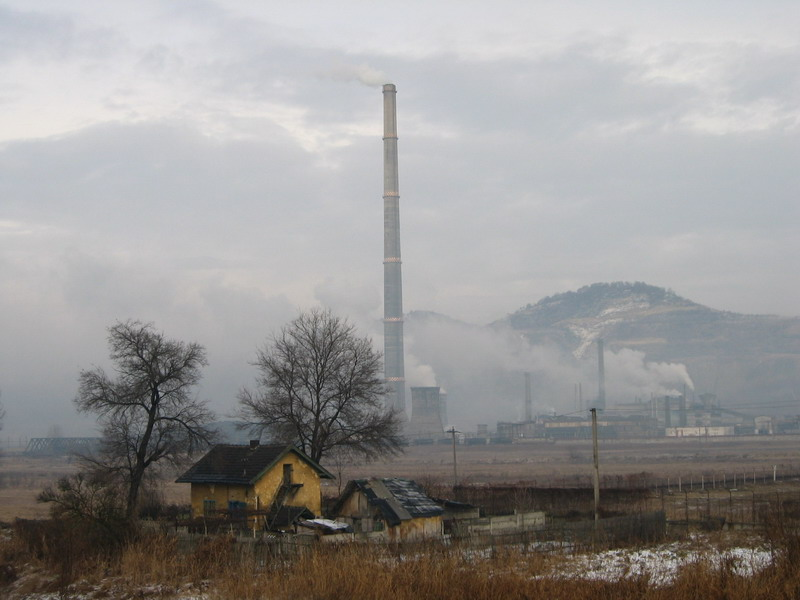
Copșa Mică Chimney

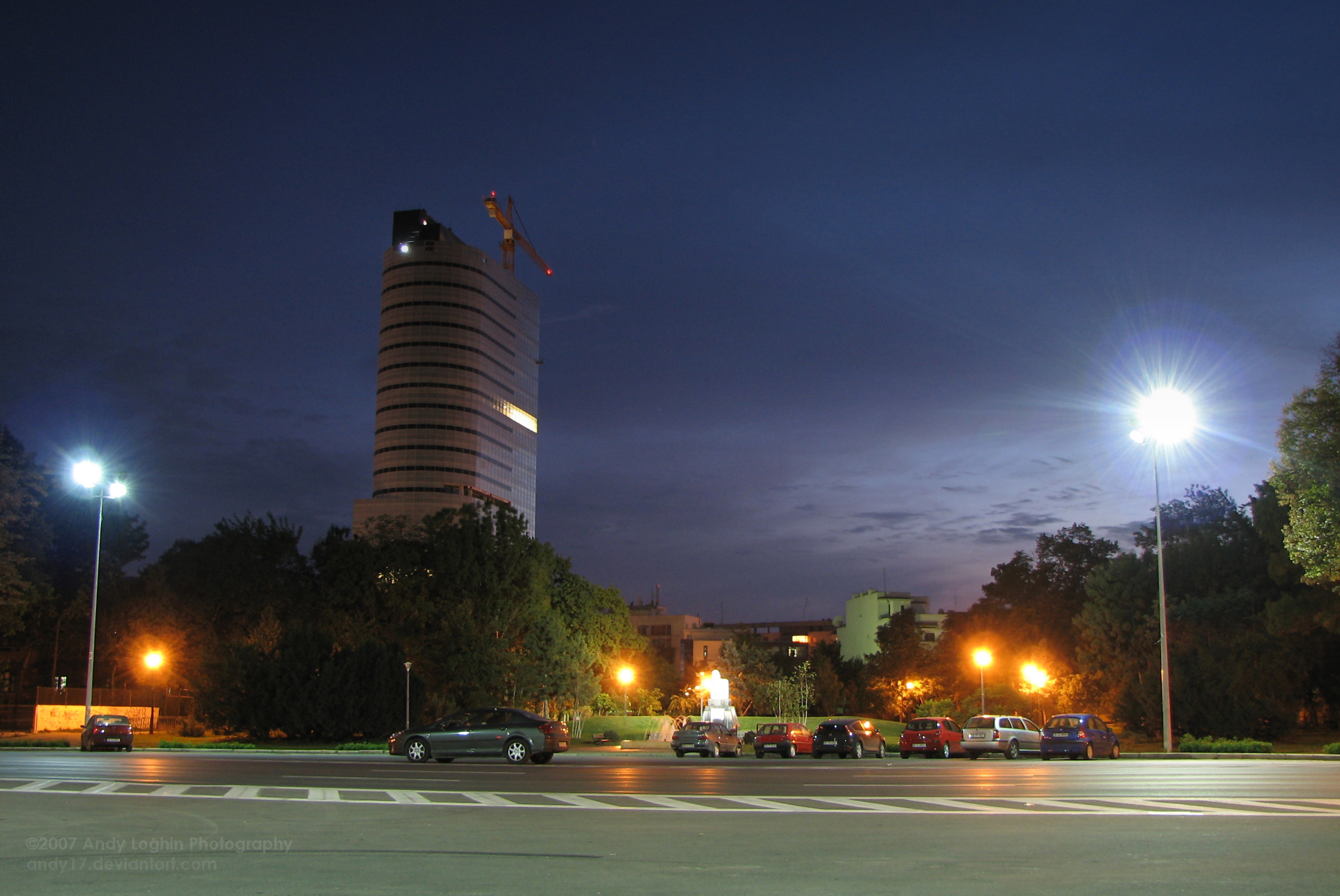
Tower Center International

This is a list of tallest structures in Romania. The list is incomplete. Please complete and correct, if necessary.

^{* including antenna}

Structure	City	Structural type	Year built	Height (m)	Location	Remarks
Phoenix Copper Smelter	Baia Mare	Chimney	1995	352	47°39′10.39″N 23°36′19.72″E	
Romag-Termo Power Plant, Chimney North	Halanga	Chimney	1981	300	44°40′32.67″N 22°41′12.03″E	
CET Brașov	Brașov	Chimney	1986	280	45°39′44.24″N 25°38′48.98″E	
CET Turceni	Turceni	Chimney	?	280	44°40′14.9″N 23°24′23.7″E ; 44°40′11.8″N 23°24′27″E ; 44°40′8.4″N 23°24′29.8″E ; 44°40′5.2″N 23°24′32.9″E	
Large chimney of CE Rovinari	Rovinari	Chimney	?	280	44°54′30.02″N 23°8′6.14″E	
CET Pitești	Pitești	Chimney	?	280	44°48′24.99″N 24°54′50.67″E	never in use
Chimney of Iulius Mall Suceava	Suceava	Chimney	?	265	47°39′32.2″N 26°16′13.3″E	
Chimney of CET Târgu Jiu	Târgu Jiu	Chimney	?	256	45°00′45.85″N 23°15′33.95″E	never in use
Bod Transmitter	Bod	Guyed mast	1946	250	45°45′22.27″N 25°36′26.77″E ; 45°45′13.16″N 25°36′25.15″E	2 guyed masts, carrying a T-antenna for longwave broadcasting
Romag-Termo Power Plant, Chimney South	Halanga	Chimney	1981	250	44°40′27.8″N 22°41′13.46″E	
Copșa Mică Chimney	Copșa Mică	Chimney	1988	250	46°6′59″N 24°13′15″E	
Brăila Power Station, Large chimney	Chiscani	Chimney	?	250	45°9′54.12″N 27°55′24.18″E	
CET Progresu	Bucharest	Chimney	?	240	44°22′18.12″N 26°6′30.5″E	
Rus Transmitter	Rus	Guyed mast		240	47°16′15″N 23°36′00″E	
Feleac Transmitter	Cluj-Napoca	Guyed mast		236	46°42′51.26″N 23°38′32.17″E	
CET Constanţa	Constanța	Chimney		224	44°9′31.28″N 28°36′26.99″E	
Boldur Transmitter	Boldur	Guyed mast		220	45°41′19.8″N 21°47′50.7″E ; 45°41′18.1″N 21°47′57.4″E	2 guyed masts, used for mediumwave broadcasting, insulated against ground?
Chimneys of Mintia-Deva Power Station	Mintia	Chimney		220	45°54′44.23″N 22°49′29.49″E ; 45°54′45.9″N 22°49′33.64″E	
Chimney of New Zlatna Copper Smelter	Zlatna	Chimney		200	46°06′52.18″N 23°14′3.86″E	
Chimney of Crivina Power Station	Anina	Chimney		220	45°02′1.59″N 21°48′57.69″E	demolished
Văcăreni transmitter	Văcăreni	Guyed mast		218	45°19′40.97″N 28°10′37.02″E	
Large Chimney of Lupeni Smelter	Lupeni	Chimney		216.4	45°21′4.46″N 23°11′57.85″E	
Boiu transmitter	Boiu	Guyed mast		216	45°56′5.99″N 23°6′29.35″E	
CET Bacău	Bacău	Chimney		210	46°31′48.8″N 26°56′18.15″E ; 46°31′48.5″N 26°56′15.4″E	
Mihoveni transmitter	Mihoveni	Guyed mast		213	47°39′45.51″N 26°9′4.61″E	
Saveni transmitter	Saveni	Guyed mast		210	47°56′2.27″N 26°50′19.58″E	
Urseni transmitter	Timișoara	Guyed mast		210	45°43′15.67″N 21°15′19.48″E	
Large Chimney of Doicești Power Station	Doicești	Chimney		208	45°0′2.77″N 25°23′49.51″E	
Balota transmitter	Balota	Guyed mast		206	44°36′1.35″N 22°49′9.75″E	
Turnul industrial din Dej	Dej	Chimney		204	47°09′46.02″N 23°53′46.73″E	demolished in 2011 by explosives
CET Arad, Large Chimney	Arad	Chimney		201	46°13′20.59″N 21°19′42.65″E	
Ciurel Transmitter	Bucharest	Lattice Tower		200	44°26′31.6″N 26°02′18.3″E	
Capriora transmitter	Popeni	Guyed mast		200	46°14′28.72″N 27°51′3.82″E	
Chimney of Craiova Power Station 1	Craiova	Chimney		200	44°23′15.68″N 23°43′5.19″E	, facility also known as Ișalnița Power Station
CE Rovinari	Rovinari	Building with 2 chimneys	?	200	44°54′30″N 23°8′13.41″E ; 44°54′26.68″N 23°8′16.8″E	
Brăila Power Station, Small chimney	Chiscani	Chimney	?	200	45°9′57.12″N 27°55′27.35″E	
Petromidia Refinery, Large chimney	Năvodari	Chimney	?	200	44°20′12.17″N 28°38′29.41″E	
Large Chimney of CET Timișoara Sud	Timișoara	Chimney	?	200	45°42′26.19″N 21°11′49.62″E	
Strejnic transmitter	Strejnic	Lattice tower		199	44°54′51.65″N 25°52′14.07″E	
Scheia transmitter	Scheia	Guyed mast		197	47°56′04″N 26°06′06″E	
Orțișoar transmitter	Orțișoara	Guyed mast		196	45°58′2.71″N 21°12′53.74″E ; 45°58′0.54″N 21°12′57.89″E	used for mediumwave broadcasting on 630 kHz
Timișoara transmitter	Timișoara	Guyed mast		196	45°45′59″N 21°13′39″E	2 masts, used for mediumwave broadcasting on 630 kHz, dismantled in 2003
Pietrăria transmitter	Pietrăria	Guyed mast		193	47°05′10.24″N 27°38′48.34″E	
Towers of Brăila Bridge	Brăila	Suspension bridge	2023	192	45°19′1.85″N 27°59′42.07″E ; 45°18′47.48″N 28°0′29.23″E	
Vârlezi Wind Turbines	Vârlezi	Wind turbine		188	45°52′30″N 27°50′44″E	
Voinești Transmitter	Voinești	Guyed mast		?	45°03′26.3″N 25°15′37.5″E ; 45°03′22.8″N 25°15′44.3″E	used for mediumwave broadcasting on 630 kHz
Tâncăbești Transmitter	Tâncăbești	Guyed mast		187	44°40′15.9″N 26°04′50.4″E	used for mediumwave broadcasting on 855 kHz
Chimney of CET Slatina	Slatina	Chimney		186	44°24′17.06″N 24°22′46.21″E	demolished
Chimney of CET1 Oradea	Oradea	Chimney		180 m	47°05′4.83″N 21°53′34.05″E	
Chimney of CET Vest Bucuresti	Bucharest	Chimney		180 m	44°25′25.06″N 25°58′42.52″E	
Chimney of CET 2 Borzești	Borzești	Chimney		180	46°15′51.53″N 26°47′43.09″E	demolished
Chimney of CET Suceava	Suceava	Chimney		180 m	47°39′6.76″N 26°17′53.84″E	
CET Zalău	Zalău	Chimney		168	47°12′21.12″N 23°1′52.96″E ; 47°12′24.85″N 23°1′58.4″E	
Chimney of CET II Holboca	Holboca	Chimney		168	47°08′50.48″N 27°43′1.56″E	
Gura Apelor Dam	Gura Apelor	Dam		168	45°20′20.3″N 22°43′18″E	
Oradea transmitter	Oradea	Guyed mast		167	47°03′31.71″N 21°58′22.3″E	
Vidraru Dam	Vidraru	Dam	1965	166	45°21′59.9″N 24°37′50″E	
Uricani Transmitter	Uricani	Guyed mast		165	47°10′56.19″N 27°27′29.22″E ; 47°10′55.02″N 27°27′24.37″E	used for mediumwave broadcasting, insulated against ground
Jucu Transmitter	Jucu	Guyed mast		165	46°52′6.16″N 23°48′37.67″E ; 46°52′3.1″N 23°48′27.16″E ; 46°52′0.4″N 23°48′27.16″E	used for mediumwave broadcasting, insulated against ground?
Dobruja-South transmitter	Băneasa	Guyed mast		161	44°02′59.71″N 27°45′8.29″E	
Large Chimney of Paroşeni Power Station	Lupeni	Chimney		160	45°21′58″N 23°15′40″E	
Valea Nucarilor Wind Turbines	Valea Nucarilor	Wind turbine		155	45°01′56″N 28°50′54″E ; 45°03′45″N 28°49′04″E	
Chimney of Oradea Power Station II	Oradea	Chimney		153	47°01′37.93″N 21°59′5.4″E	
Chimney of Antibiotice SA	Iași	Chimney		152	47°10′26.39″N 27°29′16.87″E	
Large Chimney of Cokery of Călărași Steel Works	Călărași	Chimney		152	44°13′48.73″N 27°17′30.73″E	
Galați TV Tower*	Galați	Concrete tower	1978	150	45°24′47.4″N 28°1′26.83″E	
Bacău TV Tower*	Bacău	Concrete tower		150	46°36′18.53″N 26°55′46.18″E	
Mihai Viteazu Wind Turbines	Mihai Viteazu	Wind turbine		150	44°37′46″N 28°36′28″E	
Cogealac Wind Turbines	Cogealac	Wind turbine		150	44°29′54″N 28°34′05″E	
Fantanele Wind Turbines	Fantanele	Wind turbine		150	44°35′48″N 28°35′28″E	
Dorobantu Wind Turbines	Dorobantu	Wind turbine		150	44°55′50″N 28°20′09″E	
Albesti Wind Turbines	Albesti	Wind turbine		150	46°32′45″N 27°54′58″E	
Vutcani Wind Turbines	Vutcani	Wind turbine		150	46°28′35″N 27°55′36″E	
Peștera Wind Turbines	Peștera	Wind turbine		150	44°11′25″N 28°05′07″E	
Silistea Wind Turbines	Silistea	Wind turbine		150	44°23′31″N 28°11′39″E	
Pecineaga Wind Turbines	Pecineaga	Wind turbine		150	43°52′40″N 28°29′21″E ; 43°52′32″N 28°25′36″E	
Crucea Wind Turbines	Crucea	Wind turbine		150	44°29′06″N 28°16′31″E	
Tortoman Wind Turbines	Tortoman	Wind turbine		150	44°23′22″N 28°10′49″E	
Târgușor Wind Turbines	Târgușor	Wind turbine		150	44°29′16″N 28°19′25″E	
Peștera Wind Turbines	Peștera	Wind turbine		150	44°11′53″N 28°01′24″E	
Cernavodă Wind Turbines	Cernavodă	Wind turbine		150	44°18′54″N 28°09′47″E	
Insurăței Wind Turbines	Insurăței	Wind turbine		150	44°58′19″N 27°33′19″E	
Valea Nucărilor Wind Turbines	Valea Nucărilor	Wind turbine		150	45°02′08″N 28°51′09″E	
Smulți Wind Turbines	Smulți	Wind turbine		150	45°55′43″N 27°47′41″E ; 45°55′41″N 27°47′38″E	
Șiria Transmitter	Șiria	Guyed mast		150	46°15′53.43″N 21°39′49.21″E	
Craiova Power Station Chimney	Craiova	Chimney		149	44°20′42.93″N 23°48′52.85″E	
Techirghiol TV Tower*	Techirghiol	Concrete tower		146	44°2′12.5″N 28°37′25.04″E	
Casimcea Wind Turbines	Casimcea	Wind turbine		142	44°43′05″N 28°20′31″E	
Centrului Naţional de Comunicaţii – Radiocom Transmitter	Bucharest	Lattice Tower	2008	140	44°23′38.5″N 26°7′26.5″E	
Slatina Radio Tower	Slatina	Lattice tower		140 m	44°25′26.56″N 24°23′2.44″E	
Bucharest South Power Station Chimney	Bucharest	Chimney		140	44°24′18.02″N 26°09′14.46″E	
Chimney of CET 2 Borzesti	Borzesti	Chimney		140	46°15′55.74″N 26°47′43.62″E	demolished
Botiz transmitter	Botiz	Guyed mast		139	47°51′18.1″N 22°58′24.24″E ; 47°51′1.59″N 22°58′29.45″E	used for broadcasting on 567 kHz
Târgu Jiu Transmitter	Târgu Jiu	Guyed mast		138.7	45°1′2.73″N 23°17′34.76″E ; 45°1′6.17″N 23°17′31.1″E	Transmitter for 558 kHz
Floreasca City Center – Sky Tower	Bucharest	Office building		137	44°28′42″N 26°6′14″E	
Galbeni Mediumwave Radio Mast	Galbeni	Guyed mast		135.6	46°45′20.6″N 26°50′51.96″E	insulated against ground, used for broadcasting on 1179 kHz
Câmpia Turzil Radio Tower	Câmpia Turzil	Lattice tower		135	46°30′51″N 23°54′46″E	
Limanu Wind Turbines	Limanu	Wind turbine		134	43°45′00″N 28°28′28″E	
Măgura Boiului TV Tower	Deva	Lattice tower		134	45°52′21.04″N 22°51′42.69″E	
Ciuperceni Transmitter	Ciuperceni	Guyed mast		130	43°46′40″N 24°54′56″E	
Chimney of Bistrița CPL	Bistrița	Chimney		128	47°08′17.46″N 24°29′9.23″E	
Tei Radio Tower	Bucharest	Lattice tower		127	44°27′12.46″N 26°06′23.99″E	
Bicaz Dam (Izvorul Muntelui Dam)	Piatra Neamț	Dam	1961	127	46°56′18.7″N 26°6′11.1″E	
Portul Bechet electricity pylon	Bechet	Lattice tower	1967	126.5	43°44′58.94″N 23°57′5.56″E	built for the Danube crossing of the 220 kV-powerline Ișalnița-Kozlodui, today unused
Făgărașu Nou Wind Turbines	Făgărașu Nou	Wind turbine		125	44°52′52″N 28°13′40″E	
Casimcea Wind Turbines	Casimcea	Wind turbine		125	44°44′07″N 28°18′56″E	
Rahmanu Wind Turbines	Rahmanu	Wind turbine		125	44°49′30″N 28°15′00″E	
Baia Wind Turbines	Baia	Wind turbine		125	44°45′00″N 28°39′00″E	
Iscroni Radio Mast	Iscroni	Guyed mast		123	45°22′30.06″N 23°20′35.19″E	insulated against ground
Siriu Dam	Siriu	Dam		122	45°29′29.6″N 26°15′10.4″E	
Chimney of CET Botoșani	Botoșani	Chimney		122	47°44′55.37″N 26°38′08″E	
Tulcea Radio Tower	Tulcea	Lattice tower		120	45°09′55″N 28°48′25″E	
Chimney of Romplumb	Baia Mare	Chimney		120	47°41′4.51″N 23°37′19.23″E	
Sacele Wind Turbines	Sacele	Wind turbine		120	44°29′43″N 28°34′29″E	
Dragan Dam	Huedin	Dam	1987	120	46°47′19.7″N 22°42′56.4″E	
Rausor Dam	Rausor	Dam		120	45°23′37.8″N 25°03′45.9″E	
Chimney 1 of CET București Sud	Bucharest	Chimney		120	44°24′19.32″N 26°9′9.19″E	blue painted
Bucharest Tower Center	Bucharest	Highrise	2007	120	44°27′16.16″N 26°4′52.26″E	
Small Chimney of Paroşeni Power Station	Lupeni	Chimney		120		demolished
Sintering plant no2 smoke stack	Hunedoara	Chimney	1963	120	45°46′20″N 22°54′12″E	demolished
Craiova Power Station Chimney	Craiova	Chimney		119	44°20′34.34″N 23°48′59.49″E	
Topolog transmitter	Topolog	Guyed mast		119	44°51′23.85″N 28°25′10.89″E	
Isacea Danube Powerline Crossings	Isaccea	Tower	?	118	45°16′13.2″N 28°29′46″E ; 45°16′5.7″N 28°30′1.25″E	powerlines for 750 kV and 400 kV crossing border to Ukraine
Galați Mediumwave Radio Mast	Galați	Guyed mast		117.35	45°24′13.81″N 27°59′40.4″E	insulated against ground, used for broadcasting on 1332 kHz
Ghirdoveni transmitter	Ghirdoveni	Guyed mast		115	44°56′20.91″N 25°39′16.21″E	
Nucet Radio Tower	Nucet	Lattice tower		115	45°52′20.29″N 22°51′43.86″E	
Arad Chemical Works Chimney	Arad	Chimney		115	46°10′14.97″N 21°26′2.15″E	
Semenic TV Tower	Semenic	Lattice tower on building		115	45°10′57.46″N 22°03′15.64″E	
Piatră Hill Radio Mast	Gălbiori	Guyed mast		114.3	44°28′28.65″N 28°18′22.16″E	
Basarab Tower*	Bucharest	Highrise		114	44°27′7.5″N 26°3′37.3″E	built for elevator tests
Bolotesti TV Tower	Bolotești	Lattice tower		111	47°51′26.08″N 26°56′58.22″E	
Chimney East of Old Zlatna Copper Smelter	Zlatna	Chimney		110	46°06′22.67″N 23°13′55.41″E	
Chimney West of Old Zlatna Copper Smelter	Zlatna	Chimney		110	46°06′24.03″N 23°13′49.4″E	demolished
Mahmudia Meteorological Tower	Mahmudia	Guyed mast		110	45°05′14″N 29°04′19″E	
Ramnicu Sarat Telecommunication Tower	Râmnicu Sărat	Lattice tower		109.7	45°22′42.27″N 27°02′35.51″E	
Paltinu Dam	Paltinu	Dam	1971	108	45°14′45.2″N 25°44′11.7″E	
Baba Ana Radio Tower	Baba Ana	Lattice tower		108	44°55′33″N 26°30′31″E	
Herastrau transmitter	Bucharest	Lattice Tower/ Guyed mast		107	44°28′36.7″N 26°03′02.2″E ; 44°28′37.3″N 26°03′09.4″E	FM-/TV-transmission site with T-antenna spun between a lattice tower and a guyed mast
Administrative Palace, Satu Mare*	Satu Mare	Highrise	1984	107	47°47′20″N 22°52′23″E	
Vadu Izei Radio Mast	Vadu Izei	Guyed mast		107	47°52′38.45″N 23°56′34.71″E	insulated against ground, used for broadcasting on 1404 kHz
Piteşti Radio Tower	Piteşti	Lattice tower		107	44°51′06″N 24°51′48″E	
Dej Radio Tower	Dej	Lattice tower		107	47°08′30″N 23°52′49″E	
Sighet Radio Tower	Sighet	Lattice tower		106	47°52′52″N 23°56′30″E	
Pecineagu Dam	Pecineagu	Dam		105	45°33′56.5″N 25°05′37.6″E	
Murfatlar Radio Tower	Murfatlar	Lattice tower		105	44°10′38.76″N 28°24′43.42″E	
Medgidia Radio Tower	Medgidia	Lattice tower		105	44°14′42″N 28°15′47″E	
Cernavodă Radio Tower	Cernavodă	Lattice tower		105	44°18′51″N 28°01′23″E	
Brăila Radio Tower	Brăila	Lattice tower		105	45°14′46″N 27°57′14″E	
Sinoe Radio Tower	Sinoe	Lattice tower		105	44°37′34″N 28°48′04″E	
Silistea Noua Radio Tower	Silistea Noua	Lattice tower		105	44°21′50.9″N 24°58′56.35″E	
Conachi Radio Tower	Conachi	Lattice tower		105	45°35′26″N 27°33′59″E	
Bodoc Radio Tower	Bodoc	Lattice tower		105	45°56′57″N 25°50′07″E	
Iași Radio Tower	Iași	Lattice tower		105	47°08′55″N 27°37′38″E	
Zalau Radio Tower	Zalau	Lattice tower		105	47°11′32″N 23°02′40″E	
Dambu Mare Radio Tower	Dambu Mare	Lattice tower		105	47°08′50″N 23°57′28″E	
Tecuci Radio Tower	Tecuci	Lattice tower		105	45°53′30″N 27°21′53″E	
Topolog Radio Mast	Topolog	Guyed mast		105	44°51′24.03″N 28°25′10.38″E	
House of the Free Press*	Bucharest	Highrise	1956	104	44°28′51.36″N 26°4′16.35″E	
Targu Mureş Power Station Chimney	Targu Mureş	Chimney (lattice structure)		104	46°30′42.93″N 24°30′28.58″E	
Topolog Wind Turbines	Topolog	Wind turbine		104	44°08′27″N 28°15′12″E ; 44°51′19″N 28°19′45″E	
Chimney of Iași Power Station	Iași	Chimney		104	47°08′57.58″N 27°36′18.21″E	
Large Chimney of Adjud Cellulose and Paper Factory	Adjud	Chimney		103.6	46°06′24.64″N 27°11′38.41″E	
Selenic Telecommunication Tower	Văliug	Lattice tower on building		103.6	45°10′57.6″N 22°03′15.82″E	
Vacareni Radio Tower	Vacareni	Lattice tower		103	45°23′04″N 23°28′24″E	
Ion Corvin Radio Mast	Ion Corvin	Guyed mast		102	44°07′1.23″N 27°48′4.76″E	
Tanacu Radio Tower	Tanacu	Lattice tower		101	46°40′15.27″N 27°47′20.8″E	
Calea Gulesti Radio Tower	Bucarest	Lattice tower		100	44°28′4.86″N 26°01′39.09″E	
Peștera Radio Tower	Peștera	Lattice tower		100	44°08′02″N 28°08′06″E	
Simleu Radio Tower	Simleu	Lattice tower		100	47°14′04″N 22°49′28″E	
Paltinis TV Tower	Oncesti	Lattice tower		100	45°38′33.01″N 23°56′36.37″E	
Ciocarlia Wind Turbines	Ciocarlia	Wind turbine		100	44°08′27″N 28°15′12″E	
Topraisar Wind Turbines	Topraisar	Wind turbine		100	43°58′42″N 28°31′07″E	
Mihai Viteazul Wind Turbines	Mihai Viteazul	Wind turbine		100	44°39′37″N 28°39′53″E ; 44°36′58″N 28°38′59″E	
Pantelimon Wind Turbines	Pantelimon	Wind turbine		100	44°32′13″N 28°19′42″E ; 44°32′18″N 28°17′36″E	
Siemens Martin (Open hearth furnace) No 2 Steel mill smoke stacks (a total of 8 chimneys each 100m tall)	Hunedoara	chimney	1956–1964	100	45°45′37.05″N 22°53′41.2″E ; 45°45′36″N 22°53′40.82″E ; 45°45′33.85″N 22°53′39.85″E ; 45°45′32.89″N 22°53′39.41″E ; 45°45′31.87″N 22°53′39″E ; 45°45′29.71″N 22°53′38.19″E ; 45°45′28.73″N 22°53′37.88″E ; 45°45′27.7″N 22°53′37.4″E	demolished
BRD Tower*	Bucharest	Highrise	2003	93	44°27′09″N 26°05′01″E	
Bucharest Financial Plaza	Bucharest	Highrise	1997	87	44°25′58″N 26°05′48″E	
Palace of the Parliament	Bucharest	Highrise	1989	86	44°25′39″N 26°5′15″E	
Charles de Gaulle Plaza*	Bucharest	Highrise	2005	85	44°27′55″N 26°05′15″E	
Euro Tower	Bucharest	Highrise	2009	80	44°27′25″N 26°06′23″E	
InterContinental Bucharest	Bucharest	Highrise	1970	77	44°26′14″N 26°06′08″E	
Cathedral Plaza	Bucharest	Highrise	2008	75	44°26′31″N 26°05′31″E	
Millennium Business Center	Bucharest	Highrise	2006	72	44°26′14″N 26°06′36″E	
Howard Johnson Hotel	Bucharest	Highrise	2001	70	44°26′47.35″N 26°5′56.22″E	
Fructus Tower	Timișoara	Highrise	2010	65	45°46′00″N 21°13′55″E	

== See also ==
- List of tallest buildings in Romania
- List of tallest buildings in Bucharest
