= Anina (disambiguation) =

Anina is a Romanian city.

Anina may also refer to:

== People ==
- Anina (model), an American-born fashion model
- Anina (singer) (born 1985), a Norwegian singer and songwriter
- Anina Burger (born 1967), a South African cricketer
- Anina Pinter, Los Angeles-based costume designer

== Other ==
- Anina (film), a 2013 Uruguayan–Colombian animated film
- Gârliște River (Caraș), a Romanian river
- Anina Mine, a coal mine in Romania
- Anina-Doman oil field, a shale oil field in Romania
- Crivina Power Station, a thermal power plant in Romania
