= Bucharest West Power Station =

Power station in Bucharest, Romania

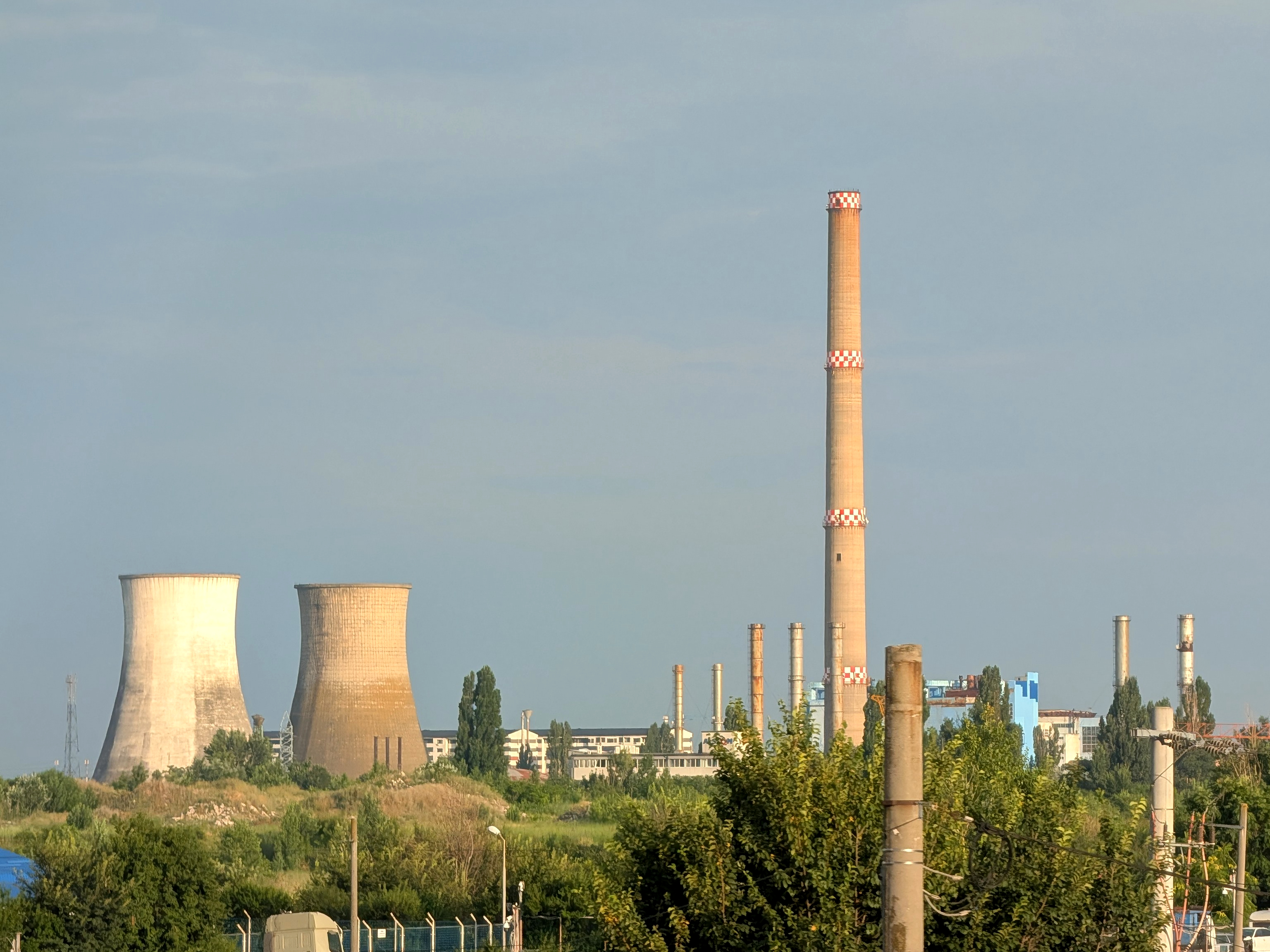
- The chimney of the power station
- Country: Romania
- Location: Bucharest
- Coordinates: 44°25′26″N 25°58′38″E
- Status: Operational
- Owner: Termoelectrica

Thermal power station
- Primary fuel: Natural gas and coke

Power generation
- Units operational: 5
- Nameplate capacity: 310 MW

The Bucharest West Power Station is a large thermal power plant located in Bucharest having 5 generation groups, 4 of 40 MW each commissioned in 1955, and one group of 190 MW commissioned in 2007 having a total electricity generation capacity of 310 MW.

== See also ==
- List of power stations in Romania
