= Pitești Sud Power Station =

Thermal power plant in Piteşti, Romania

Piteşti Sud Power Station
- Country: Romania
- Location: Piteşti
- Coordinates: 44°51′30″N 24°52′00″E
- Status: Operational
- Owner: Termoelectrica

Thermal power station
- Primary fuel: Natural gas and coal

Power generation
- Units operational: 5
- Nameplate capacity: 136 MW

The Piteşti Sud Power Station is a large thermal power plant located in Piteşti, having 2 generation groups of 50 MW each and 3 groups of 12 MW having a total electricity generation capacity of 136 MW.

== See also ==
- List of power stations in Romania
