= Brazi II Power Station =

Thermal powerplant in Brazi, Romania

- Country: Romania
- Location: Brazi
- Status: Operational
- Owner: Termoelectrica

Thermal power station
- Primary fuel: Natural gas

Power generation
- Units operational: 3
- Nameplate capacity: 150 MW

The Brazi II Power Station is a large thermal power plant located in Prahova County, Brazi, Romania. It is owned and operated by OMV Petrom and is Romania's largest privately-funded greenfield project for electricity generation, having 3 generation groups 50 MW each resulting a total electricity generation capacity of 150 MW. The power plant operates on natural gas, with a combined-cycle system that enables it to produce electricity with lower emissions. This setup includes two gas turbines, each with a capacity of 290 MW, and a steam turbine at 310 MW, resulting in a total installed capacity of 860 MW.

== See also ==
- List of power stations in Romania
