= Giurgiu Power Station =

Power plant in Giurgiu County, Romania

- Country: Romania
- Location: Giurgiu
- Status: Operational
- Owner: Termoelectrica

Thermal power station
- Primary fuel: Coal

Power generation
- Units operational: 3
- Nameplate capacity: 150 MW

The Giurgiu Power Station is a large thermal power plant located in Giurgiu, having 3 generation groups of 50 MW each resulting a total electricity generation capacity of 150 MW.

== See also ==
- List of power stations in Romania
