= List of power stations in Romania =

Location of power stations in Romania: nuclear, coal/oil/gas, hydroelectric

This is a list of the main thermal power plants in Romania which at the end of 2006 had a total generating capacity of 11.335 MW.

== Coal/oil/gas ==
Power station	Town	Coordinates	Installed capacity (MW)	Unit capacity (MW)	Refs
Turceni Power Station	Turceni	44.668622°N 23.405771°E	2640	8 x 330	
Mintia Power Station	Mintia	45.914004°N 22.825234°E	1260	6 x 210	
Işalniţa Power Station	Işalniţa	44.388562°N 23.718002°E	1035	3 x 50; 1 x 55; 2 x 100; 2 x 315	
Rovinari Power Station	Rovinari	44.906803°N 23.138344°E	990	2 x 200; 4 x 330	
Brăila Power Station	Chiscani	45.166214°N 27.922847°E	960	3 x 210; 1 x 330	
Brazi Power Station	Negoiesti	44.8829°N 26.008265°E	910	6 x 50; 2 x 105; 2 x 200	
Iernut Power Station	Iernut	46.467749°N 24.18329°E	800	4 x 100; 2 x 200	
Borzeşti Power Station	Oneşti	46.250669°N 26.833098°E	655	3 x 25; 2 x 50; 1 x 60; 1 x 210	
Bucharest South Power Station	Bucharest	44.404645°N 26.152332°E	550	2 x 50; 2 x 100; 2 x 125	
Galaţi Power Station	Galaţi	45.43603°N 27.981362°E	535	2 x 60; 1 x 100; 3 x 105	
Craiova II Power Station	Craiova	44.345251°N 23.814647°E	300	2 x 150	
Paroşeni Power Station	Jiu Paroşeni	45.364750°N 23.260975°E	300	3 x 50; 1 x 150	

== Hydroelectric ==
Station	Town	Coordinates	Capacity (MW)	Refs
Bicaz-Stejaru Hydroelectric Power Station	Bicaz	46.9386307°N 26.1028719°E	210	
Brădişor Dam	Brădişor		115	
Lotru-Ciunget Hydroelectric Power Station	Ciunget	45.4470051°N 23.7681913°E	800	
Mărişelu Hydroelectric Power Station	Mărişelu		221	
Oaşa Dam	Sebeş		150	
Iron Gate I Hydroelectric Power Station	Drobeta-Turnu Severin	44.6732766°N 22.5320363°E	1,166	
Iron Gate II Hydroelectric Power Station	Portile de Fier II	46.7889°N 22.5671625°E	321	
Remeţi Hydroelectric Power Station	Remeţi	44.6732766°N 22.7156°E	100	
Ruieni Hydroelectric Power Station	Turnu Ruieni	45.4260459°N 22.475667°E	153	
Râul Mare Hydroelectric Power Station	Râul Mare	45.3376069°N 22.7201986°E	335	
Şugag Dam	Şugag	45.689244°N 23.6093831°E	150	
Tismana Hydroelectric Power Station	Tismana	45.0444035°N 22.9472423°E	106	
Vidraru Hydroelectric Power Station	Arges	45.3667°N 24.6307°E	220	

== Nuclear ==
Name	Location	Coordinates	Type	Capacity, MWe	Operational	Refs
Cernavodă Nuclear Power Plant	Cernavodă	44.3203019°N 28.059361°E	CANDU	1400	1996, 2007	

== See also ==
- Energy in Romania
- List of coal power stations
- List of largest power stations in the world
