= Arad Power Station =

Thermal power plant in Arad, Romania

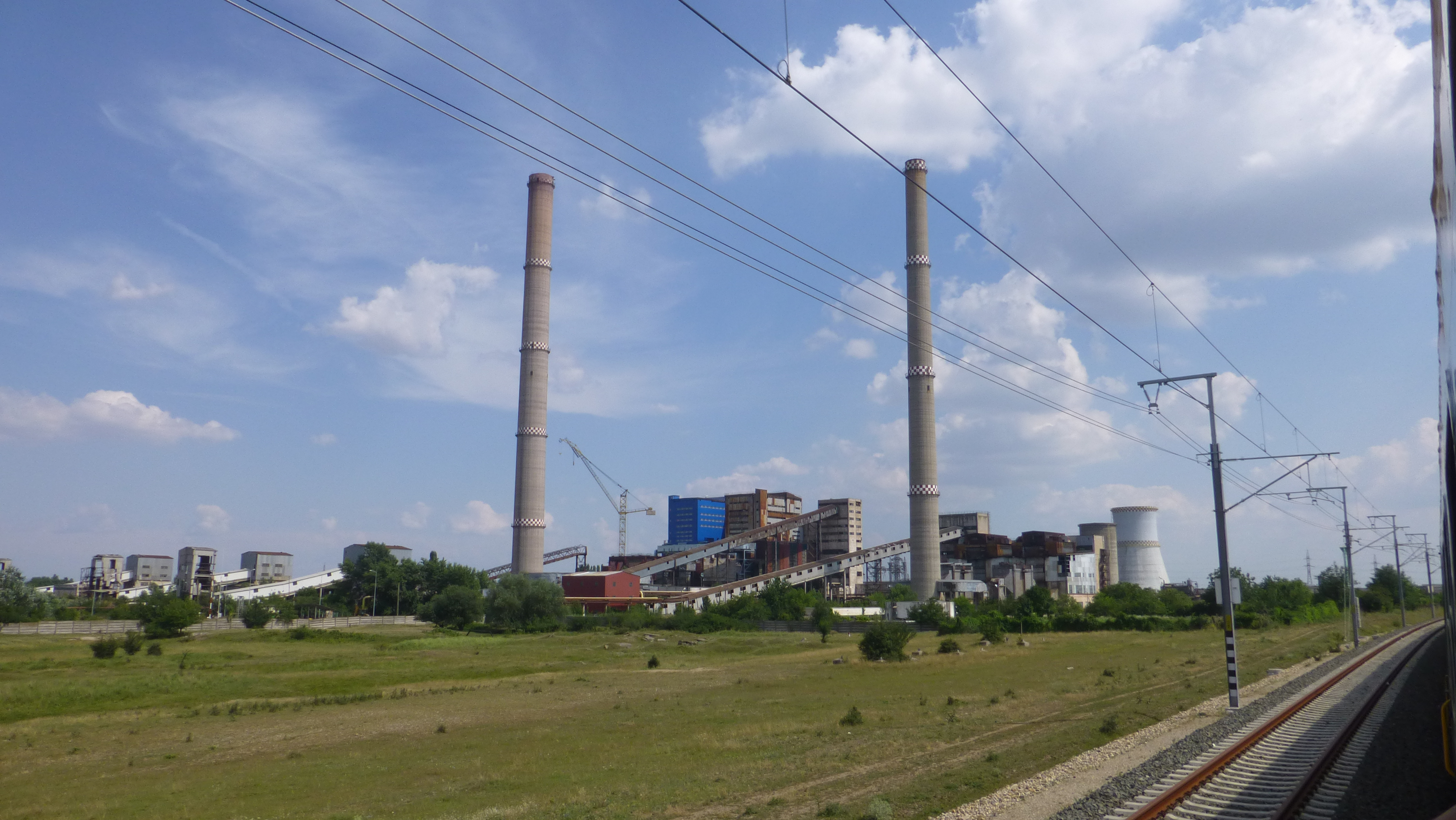
- Country: Romania
- Location: Arad
- Coordinates: 46.221095988341744°N 21.328157104297535°E
- Status: Operational
- Owner: Termoelectrica

Thermal power station
- Primary fuel: Natural gas and coal

Power generation
- Units operational: 3
- Nameplate capacity: 112 MW

The Arad Power Station is a large thermal power plant located in Arad, having 2 generation groups of 50 MW each and one generating unit of 12 MW having a total electricity generation capacity of 112 MW.

The eastern chimney of the power station's two chimneys is 201 meters tall.

== See also ==
- List of tallest structures in Romania
