= Turceni Power Station =

Thermal power plant in Turceni, Gorj County, Romania

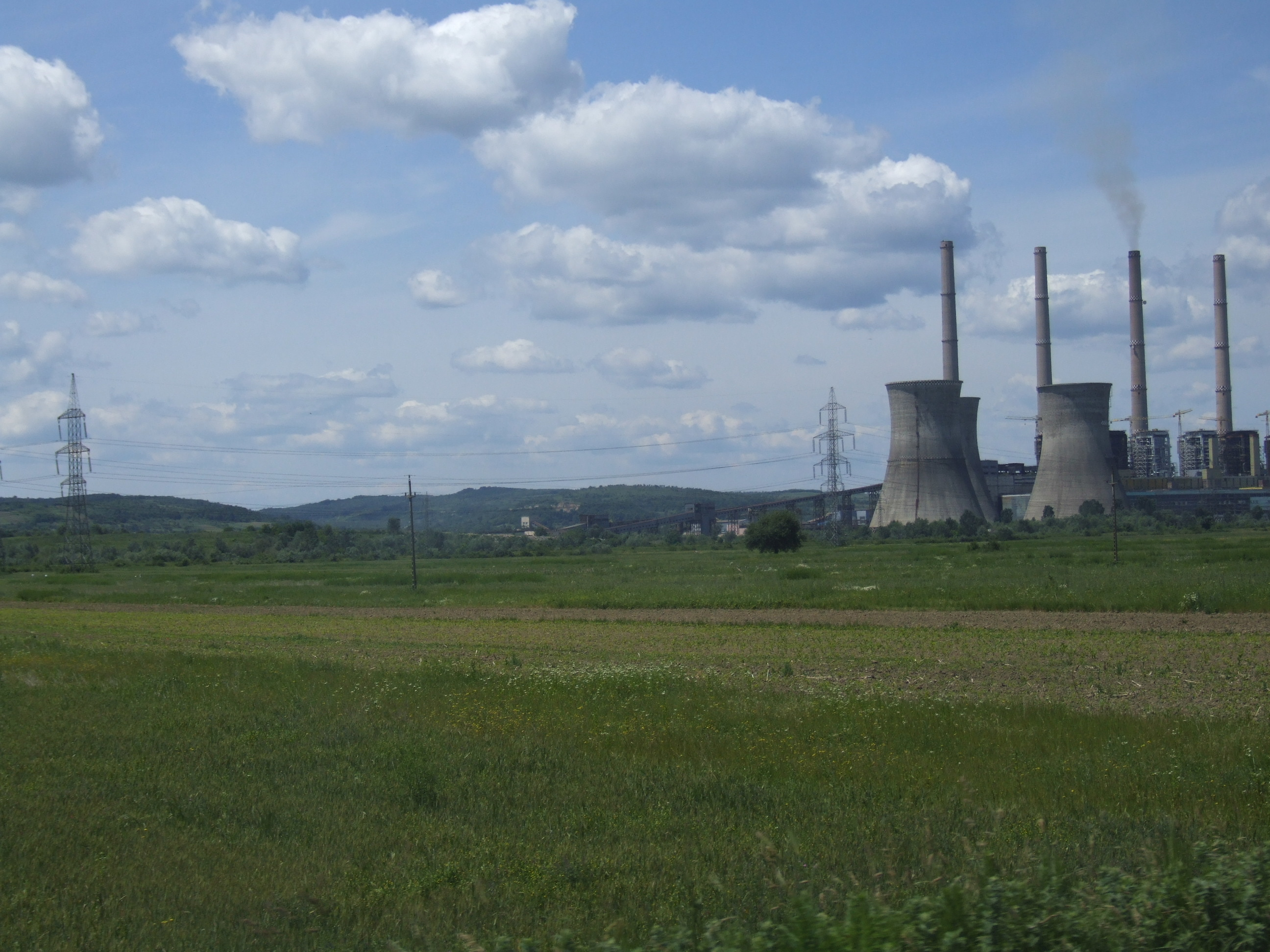
- Plant south cooling towers and all smokestacks viewed from the east
- Official name: Complexul Energetic Turceni
- Country: Romania
- Location: Gorj County
- Coordinates: 44°40′11″N 23°24′28″E
- Status: Operational
- Commission date: 1978
- Operator: Complexul Energetic Oltenia

Thermal power station
- Primary fuel: Lignite
- Cooling source: Jiu River; 7 × natural draft cooling towers

Power generation
- Units operational: 2 × 330 MW; 2 × 330 MW (mothballed)
- Units cancelled: 1 × 330 MW
- Units decommissioned: 3 × 330 MW
- Nameplate capacity: 1,320 MW
- Annual net output: 7,367 GW·h (2011)

External links
- Commons: Related media on Commons

The Turceni Power Station is situated in Gorj County (South-Western Romania), on the banks of the Jiu River, halfway between the cities of Craiova and Târgu Jiu.

It is Romania's largest electricity producer and one of the largest thermal power plants in Europe, having 4 units of 330 MW net each. But only 2 units are operational, with the other 2 being mothballed thus totalling a capacity of 1230 MW. An eighth unit was not completed, and in fact was dismantled. Unit 6, was refurbished and mothballed awaiting modernization.

The power station uses coal from the Jilț Coal Mine and the Tehomir underground mine.

The power plant has four smokestacks, each one 280 metres (920 ft) tall.

== Background ==
The Turceni power plant is sponsored by Complexul Energetic Oltenia. The project envisaged eight units of 309 MW net each, but that was increased to 330 MW. The first seven units entered service from 1978 to 1987. The eighth unit was not commissioned and later dismantled. Unit 2 was later decommissioned, and unit 6 was refurbished and mothballed. Unit 4 and 5 were refurbished afterwards. The specific coal that the power plant uses is lignite, a coal which is not as environmentally sustainable as other types of coal due to its high carbon emissions. So far, there are 2 lignite mines in Romania which supply the resources for the units.

== Design and specification ==
Each unit is composed of a boiler, a turbine and a generator. The Babcock & Wilcox-licensed boiler, of the tower forced circulation type and intermediate overheating is rated at 1,035 t steam per hour. Slag and ash are hydraulically removed. The boiler temperature output is 540 °C (1,004 °F) at 199 bars (2,890 psi). The steam turbine drives a synchronous hydrogen cooled Alsthom/ABB licensed generator, which delivers 309 MW net, 330 MW gross power. Cooling water is provided by the Jiu River and condenser cooling is delivered by 7 × natural draft cooling towers in countercurrent. The power plant is required to have some regulations on their sulfur emissions, so the project may be financed by a yen-based official development assistance loan from the Japan Bank for International Cooperation (JBIC) to install flue gas desulfurization units on the power plants to remove around 95% of SO2.

The plant supply is connected by 6 × 110 kV lines and output goes to 4 × 400 kV lines through 24 × 400 kV transformers.

== Operations ==
All remaining units are expected to be decommissioned by 2030.

Unit	Capacity (MW)	Commissioned	Status
Turceni - 1	330	July 1978	decommissioned
Turceni - 2	330	August 1979	decommissioned
Turceni - 3	330	August 1980	decommissioned
Turceni - 4	330	December 1981	refurbished, operational
Turceni - 5	330	August 1983	refurbished, operational
Turceni - 6	330	September 1985	refurbished, mothballed
Turceni - 7	330	November 1987	mothballed
Turceni - 8		-	cancelled

== Production ==
Starting 2012, production data is provided by Autorității Naționale de Reglementare în domeniul Energiei (National Regulatory Authority for Energy) as part of S.C. Complexul Energetic Oltenia S.A. generation, together with the Rovinari, Ișalnița and Craiova plants.

Year	GW·h	Year	GW·h
2012	-	2007	6,702
2011	7,367	2006	6,883
2010	6,167	2005	5,675
2009	6,220	2004	5,684
2008	7,681	2003	6,799

== Costs and Financing ==
The rehabilitation of Unit 6 will cost approximately EUR 266 million, and is being financed by the European Bank for Reconstruction and Development (EBRD). Initially, the EBRD offered a loan of EUR 150 million in 2008–2009. After the rehabilitation and start of the project, the EBRD will provide about EUR 200 million using an A/B loan structure towards the Turceni project with the hopes of improving energy efficiency, reducing carbon dioxide emissions, decreasing pollution, and implementing modern technology.

== Controversies ==
There are many controversies surrounding the project and whether the European Bank for Research and Development (EBRD) should finance the rehabilitation of this project. In 2009, the Health and Environment Alliance concluded that the Turceni power plant was considered the second most polluting industrial facility in all of Europe. The gross amount of primary energy consumption in Romania has also decreased significantly over the last 10 years, with an average annual decrease of around 5.66%. This drastic decrease stirs up controversy on whether or not the plant is worth being financed by the EBRD.

The lack of transparency and regulatory precautions are another reason why the project has many naysayers. Since Unit 6 had already existed before its closure and now its rehabilitation, an Environmental Impact Assessment (EIA) was not mandatory. An EIA is a key component in properly addressing potential environmental consequences of a project, and not having on for this grand power plant has made environmental NGOs and other members of the public uneasy. There have also been alleged cases of money laundering, suspicious payments, and bribery.

The harmful effects caused on the surrounding environment has been a topic of controversy as well. The continuation of building the unit and furthering the project will cause large amounts of deforestation, as mines will have to be enlarged to provide extra supplies of energy. These reasons have brought organizations such as Greenpeace Romania and CEE Bankwatch Network to verbally protest against the sponsors and the EBRD. The Turceni Power Plant has already negatively impacted the local Romanians and the environment; in 2013, the Oltenia Energy Complex in Turceni was responsible for the accidental spillage of coal ash. This accident spread to approximately 10 households and 15 hectares of agricultural lands. Many months after the spillage, these villagers were still facing the negative benefits of the spillage, as their houses and surrounding areas were not cleaned up. This incident caused a deep distrust and further controversy towards the rehabilitation of the power plant.

== See also ==
- List of tallest structures in Romania
