= Oradea Power Station =

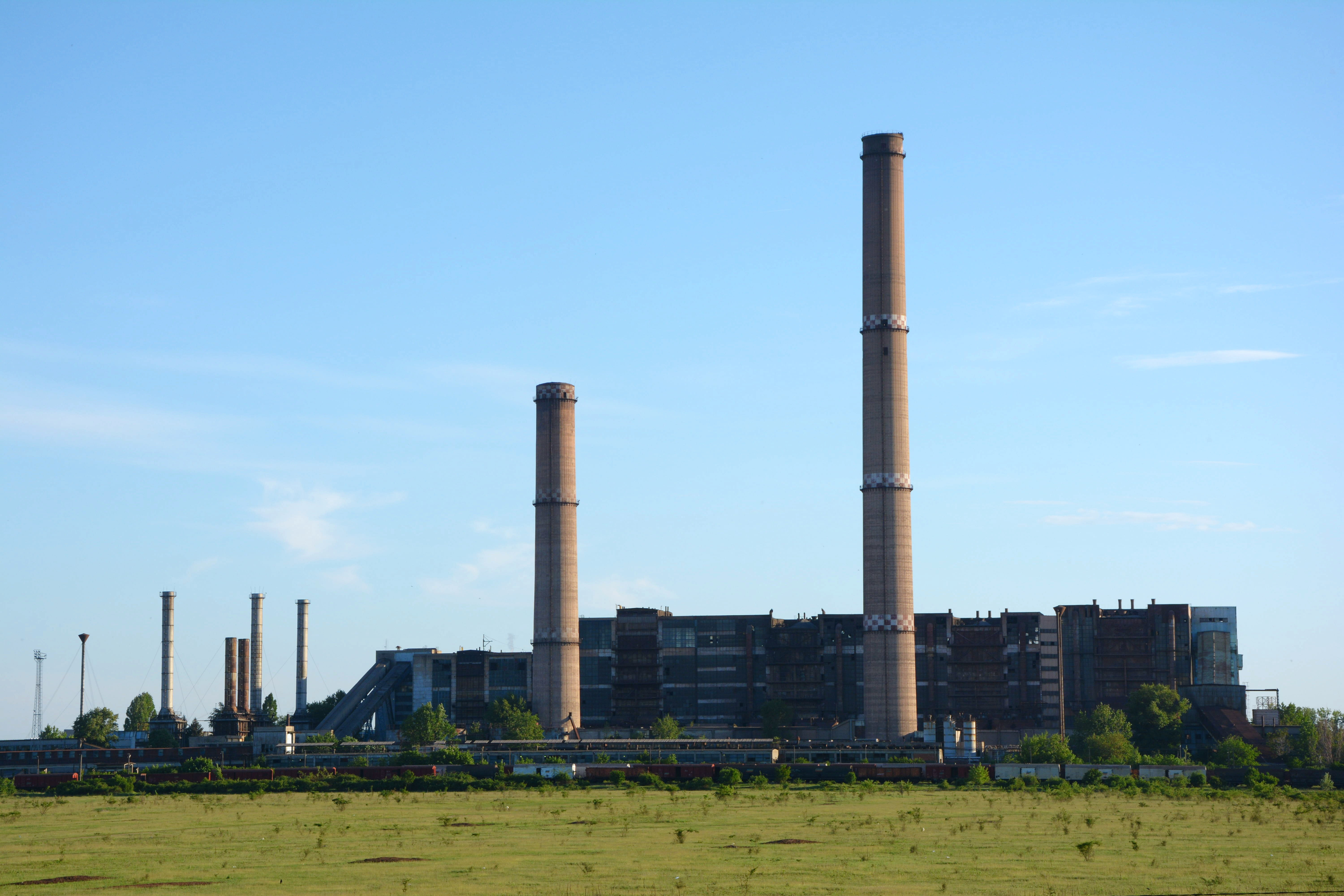
- Country: Romania
- Location: Oradea
- Status: Operational
- Owner: Electrocentrale Oradea

Thermal power station
- Primary fuel: Coal

Power generation
- Units operational: 5
- Nameplate capacity: 205 MW

The Oradea Power Station is a large thermal power plant located in Oradea, having 5 generation groups, 4 of 50 MW each and one of 5 MW resulting a total electricity generation capacity of 205 MW.

== See also ==
- List of power stations in Romania
