= Brăila (disambiguation) =

Brăila is a city in Muntenia, eastern Romania.

Brăila or Braila may also refer to:

- Brăila County, whose seat is Brăila
- Brailivka, known as Brăila in Romanian
- Brăila, a village in the commune of Băcioi, Moldova
- Brăila Power Station, a thermal power plant
- Great Brăila Island, an island on the Danube river in Brăila County
- Port of Brăila, Brăila
- Ștefan Mihăilescu-Brăila (1925–1996), Romanian actor
- Volodymyr Braila (born 1978), Ukrainian footballer

== See also ==
- ACS Dacia Unirea Brăila, an association football club based in Brăila
- HC Dunărea Brăila, a women's handball club based in Brăila
- Franco-Româna Brăila, a defunct association football club based in Brăila
- Balta Mică a Brăilei Natural Park, Brăila County
