= Bretelin =

Bretelin may refer to:

- Bretelin village in Vețel commune, Romania
- Bretelin River, a river in Romania
