= Iași I Power Station =

Iaşi I Power Station
- Country: Romania
- Location: Iaşi
- Coordinates: 47°09′30″N 27°35′30″E
- Status: Operational
- Owner: Termoelectrica

Thermal power station
- Primary fuel: Natural gas and coke

Power generation
- Units operational: 4
- Nameplate capacity: 150 MW

The Iaşi I Power Station is a large thermal power plant located in Iaşi, having 4 generation groups, 2 of 50 MW each and 2 of 25 MW having a total electricity generation capacity of 150 MW.
