= Brașov Power Station =

Braşov Power Station
- Country: Romania
- Location: Braşov
- Status: Operational
- Owner: Termoelectrica

Thermal power station
- Primary fuel: Natural gas and coal

Power generation
- Units operational: 2
- Nameplate capacity: 100 MW

The Braşov Power Station is a CHP thermal power plant located in Braşov, having 2 generation groups of 50 MW each having a total electricity generation capacity of 100 MW.
