= Buzău Power Station =

Power plant in Buzäu, Romania

- Country: Romania
- Location: Buzău
- Coordinates: 45°09′45″N 26°49′10″E
- Status: Operational
- Owner: Termoelectrica

Thermal power station
- Primary fuel: Natural gas and coke

Power generation
- Units operational: 5
- Nameplate capacity: 207 MW

The Buzău Power Station is a large thermal power plant located in Buzău, Romania having four generation groups of 45 MW and one group of 27 MW and having a total electricity generation capacity of 207 MW.
