= Iași II Power Station =

Power plant in Iași County, Romania

- Country: Romania
- Location: Iași
- Status: Operational
- Owner: Termoelectrica

Thermal power station
- Primary fuel: Natural gas and coke

Power generation
- Units operational: 2
- Nameplate capacity: 100 MW

The Iași II Power Station is a large thermal power plant located in Iași, having 2 generation groups of 50 MW each having a total electricity generation capacity of 100 MW.
