= Suceava Power Station =

- Country: Romania
- Location: Suceava
- Status: Operational
- Owner: Termica

Thermal power station
- Primary fuel: Coal

Power generation
- Units operational: 2
- Nameplate capacity: 100 MW

The Suceava Power Station is a large thermal power plant located in Suceava, Romania, having two generation groups of 50 MW each resulting a total electricity generation capacity of 100 MW.

== See also ==
- List of power stations in Romania
