= Fântânele Power Station =

Power station in Mureș County, Romania

- Country: Romania
- Location: Mureș County
- Status: Operational
- Owner: Termoelectrica

Thermal power station
- Primary fuel: Natural gas

Power generation
- Units operational: 5 x 50 MW
- Nameplate capacity: 250 MW

The Fântânele Power Station is a large thermal power plant located in Mureș County having 5 generation groups of 50 MW having a total electricity generation capacity of 250 MW.
