= Paroșeni Power Station =

Power plant in Hunedoara County, Romania

Paroșeni Power Plant
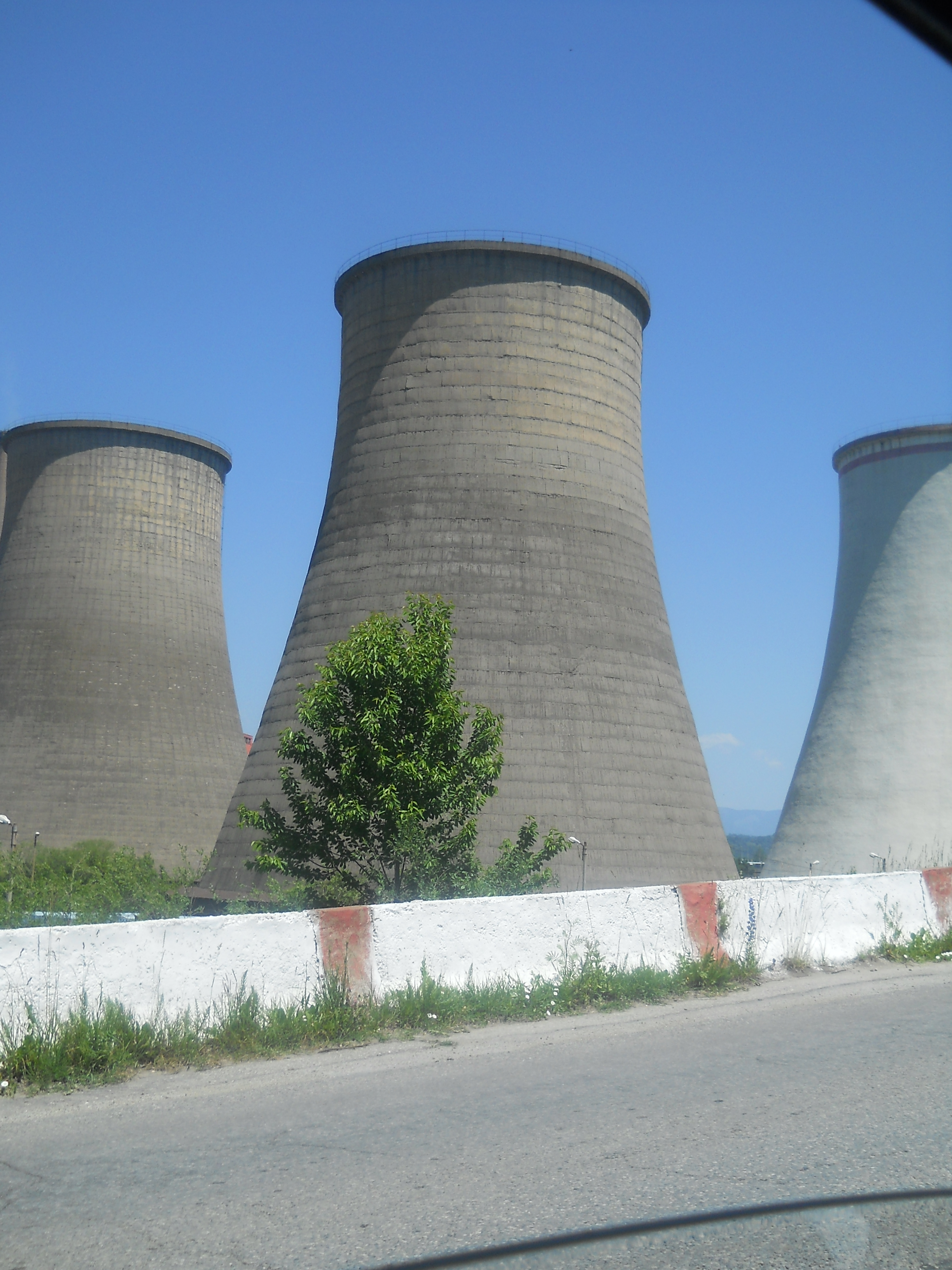
- Country: Romania
- Location: Hunedoara county
- Coordinates: 45°54′48″N 22°49′32″E
- Status: Operational
- Construction began: 1952
- Commission date: 1956
- Operator: Complexul Energetic Hunedoara

Thermal power station
- Primary fuel: Bituminous coal

Power generation
- Units operational: 1 x 150 MW
- Units decommissioned: 3 x 50 MW
- Nameplate capacity: 150 MW
- Capacity factor: 130 MW

External links
- Website: cevj.ro

The Paroșeni Power Station is a large electricity producer and one of the largest thermal power plants in Romania with one unit and an installed capacity of 150 MW. The powerplant used to have 3 more units of 50 MW each but they were decommissioned.

The power plant is situated in the Hunedoara County (central-western Romania), on the banks of the Jiu River.

== Operations ==
Units 1, 2 and 3 were decommissioned in 2009 due to not meeting environmental standards for pollution.

Unit	Commissioned	Capacity (MW)	Status
Paroșeni - 1	1956	50	decommissioned
Paroșeni - 2	1957-1959	50	decommissioned
Paroșeni - 3	1957-1959	50	decommissioned
Paroșeni - 4	1964	150	refurbished, operational

== See also ==
- List of power stations in Romania
