= Crivina Power Station =

- Official name: Termocentrala de la Crivina
- Country: Romania
- Location: Crivina
- Coordinates: 45°02′1.59″N 21°48′57.69″E
- Status: Decommissioned
- Construction began: 1976
- Commission date: 1983
- Decommission date: 1988
- Owner: Termoelectrica

Thermal power station
- Primary fuel: Oil shale

Power generation
- Units decommissioned: 3 x 330 MW
- Nameplate capacity: 990 MW

The Crivina Power Station (Romanian: Termocentrala de la Crivina) was a large thermal power plant located in Crivina, near Anina in Caraș-Severin County. It had three generating units of 330 MW each, altogether having a total electricity generating capacity of 990 MW. It was intended to be the first oil shale power station built in Romania. The total cost of the oil shale power plant was around US$1 billion. The Crivina Power Station was supplied with 4 million tonnes of oil shale per year from the nearby Anina Mine.

== History ==
This power plant works only for 76 hours in reality. At the beginning of the 1970s Nicolae Ceaușescu, then President of Romania, decided to build a large thermal power station in Caraș-Severin County to exploit the large oil shale deposits located in the area. At first the power station was intended to be built in Ticvaniu Mic commune, now part of the Ticvaniu Mare commune, near Oraviţa but the chosen site had a very small water supply that was not sufficient for the power station. In 1976 a new location was found at Crivina, located in the mountains near Anina. In 1983 the construction of the power station was complete and the first 330 MW electric power generation unit was put online. The turbine could not reach its highest potential capacity due to the low quality of the oil shale deposits. The communist regime also built a town that was used to house the power station's workers. It was intended to have 10,000 inhabitants, and a part of Anina had to move to this new location to make way for oil shale surface mines.

The first of the three power generation units was completed in 1983, and in 1984 generated its first electricity from burning oil shale. The unit functioned only around 2000 hours per year between 1984 and 1988 until it was shut down, its main generator having broken down and was sent to Bucharest for repairs, only for it to be sent to Rovinari in 1990. Eventually between 2003 and 2009, most of the power station was demolished and slowly sold for scrap. The station also had a 220 metres (720 ft) tall flue gas stack that was at the time Romania's second tallest.
