= Brazi Power Station =

Power plant in Brazi, Romania

- Country: Romania
- Location: Brazi
- Status: Operational
- Operator: Termo Ploiesti

Thermal power station
- Primary fuel: Natural gas

Power generation
- Units operational: 1 x 105 MW; 1 x 25 MW
- Units decommissioned: 5 x 50 MW 1 x 150 MW 2 x 200 MW
- Nameplate capacity: 130 MW

The Brazi Power Station is a thermal power plant located in Brazi, a commune in Prahova, Romania, with two operational generation groups, one 105 MW and one 25 MW, resulting in a total electricity generation capacity of 130 MW. It used to also have five 50MW, two 150 MW and two 200 MW.

Between 2004 and 2022 it was operated by S.C. Dalkia Termo Prahova S.R.L., later renamed to S.C. Veolia Energie Prahova S.R.L. Since 2022, it has been operated by Termo Ploiești.

== See also ==
- List of power stations in Romania
