= Bucharest South Power Station =

Thermal power plant in Bucharest

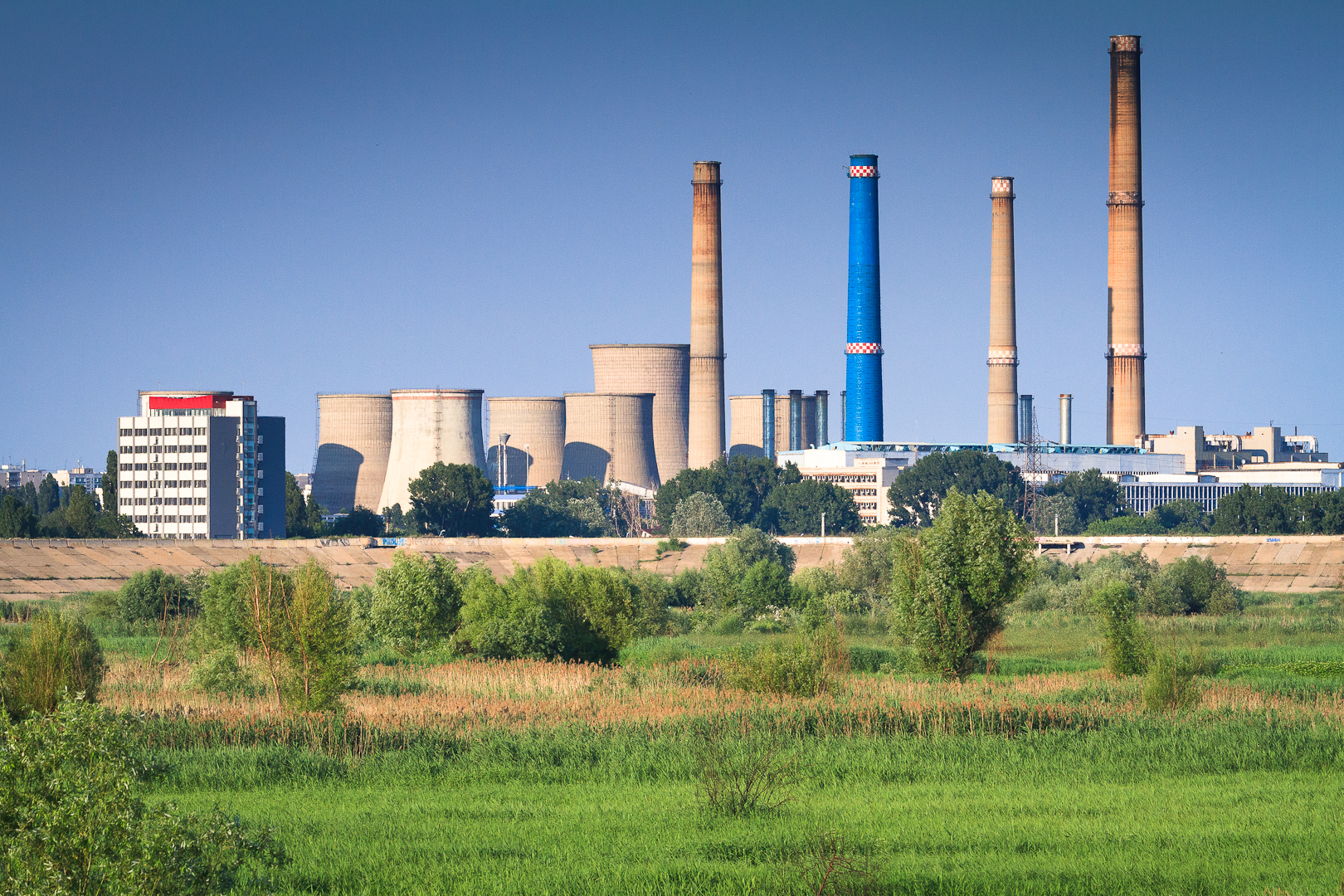
- View of the power station from Văcăreşti Lake
- Country: Romania
- Location: Bucharest
- Coordinates: 44°24′21″N 26°9′20″E
- Status: Operational
- Owner: Termoelectrica

Thermal power station
- Primary fuel: Natural gas and coke

Power generation
- Units operational: 6
- Nameplate capacity: 550 MW

External links
- Commons: Related media on Commons

The Bucharest South Power Station is a large thermal power plant located in Bucharest, having 2 generation groups of 50 MW each, 2 units of 100 MW and 2 units of 125 MW having a total electricity generation capacity of 550 MW.

The two chimneys of the power station are 140 metres tall.
