= Progresu Power Station =

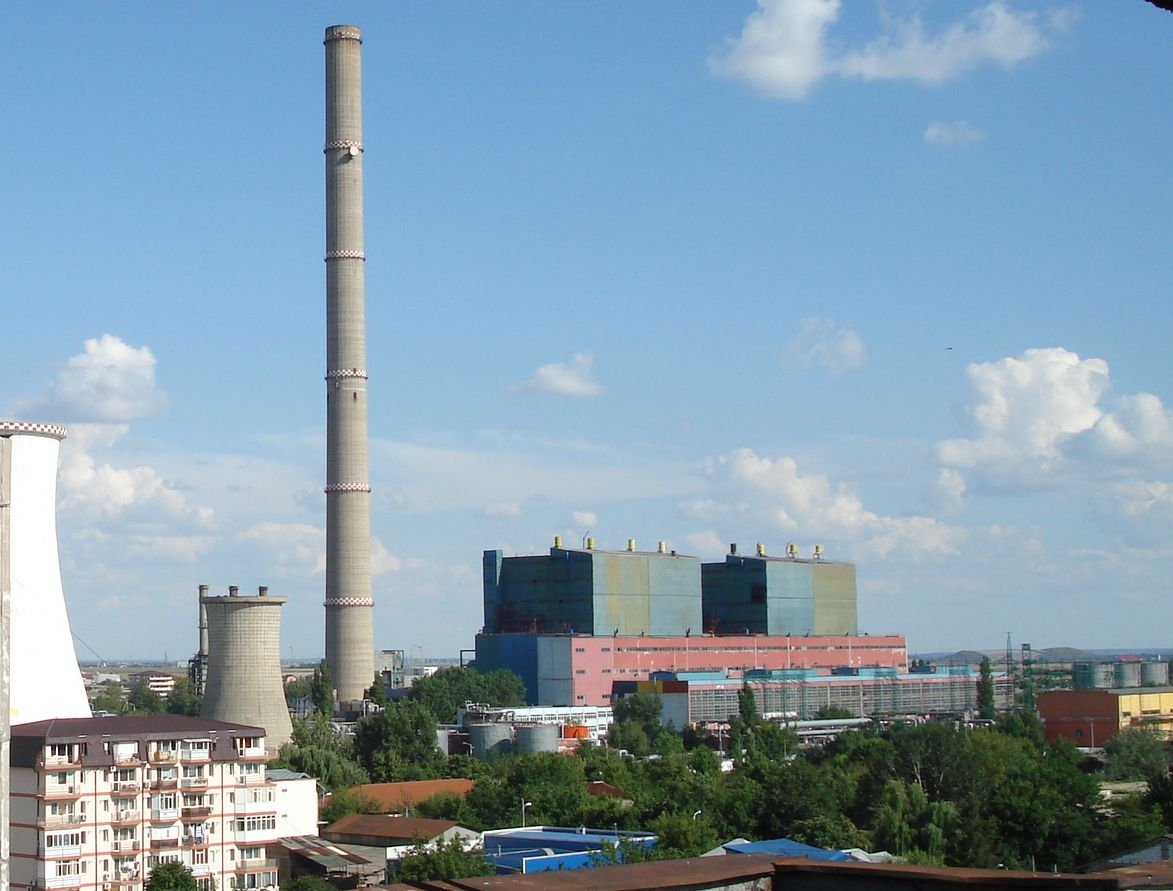
- Vedere a coşului de fum şi a clădirii termocentralei Progresu
- Country: Romania
- Location: Bucharest
- Coordinates: 44°22′22″N 26°6′26″E
- Status: Operational
- Owner: Termoelectrica

Thermal power station
- Primary fuel: Natural gas and coke
- Site elevation: 90 m (300 ft)

Power generation
- Units operational: 4
- Nameplate capacity: 200 MW

The Progresu Power Station is a large thermal power plant located in Bucharest, having 4 generation groups of 50 MW each having a total electricity generation capacity of 200 MW. Its chimney is the tallest structure in Bucharest with a height of 240 metres.

44°22′18.12″N 26°6′30.5″E
