= Reformed church of Mintia =

Historical monument, Reformed church in Romania

Coordinates: 45°55′25″N 22°51′08″E

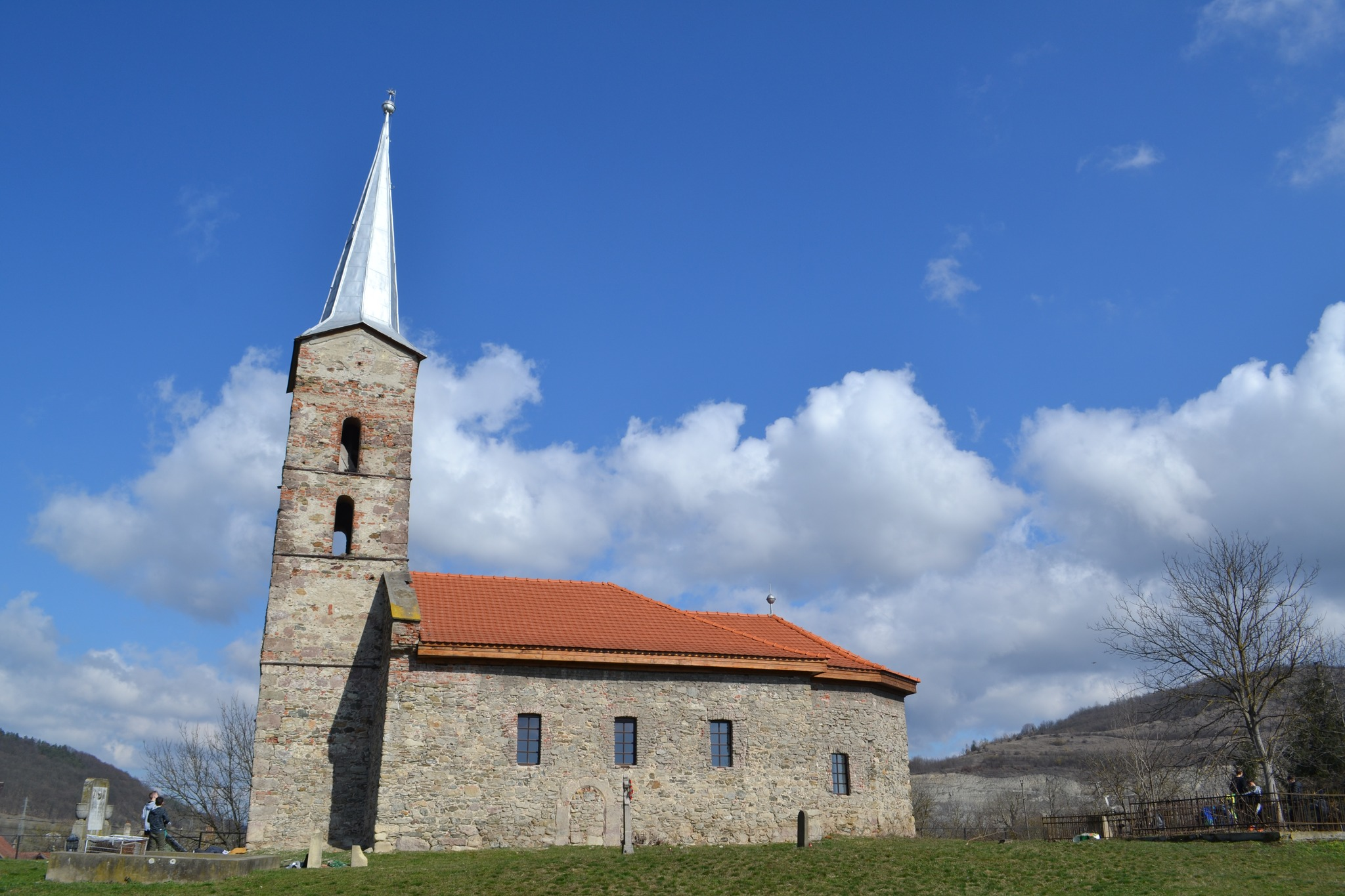
The South side of the church

The Reformed church of Mintia in Mintia, Hunedoara County, Romania, is a declared historic monument. It is found in the National Register of Historic Monuments under the code HD-II-m-A-03365.

== History ==
It was built around 1640, presumably on the site of a medieval church, as indicated by its vaulted sanctuary. The village was the property of the Gyulay family for a long time, and the church served as the family's court parish. Several members of the Gyulay and the Kuun family are buried in the church. It was an independent congregation until 1930, after which the pastorate ceased to exist, and ministers came from Ilia and Deva. Its bell, made in 1760, was transferred to the Reformed Church of Deva when the congregation terminated.

In 1978, a new roof was installed on the church. By 2000 the congregation had been depopulated and the condition of the abandoned church steadily deteriorated. Between 2020 and 2022 the church was restored with the support of the Hungarian Government and the Hunedoara County Council.

== Description ==
According to Ferenc Léstyán, it was originally a Romanesque basilica. Its sanctuary is polygonal, with the coat of arms of the Haller and Gyulay families underneath. The ceiling is partly vaulted. The entrance under the tower bears a Renaissance stone carving representing a bunch of grapes.
