= Pietrărie Transmitter =

Coordinates: 47°05′09″N 27°38′48″E

Pietrăria transmitter (Romanian: Releul Pietrărie) is a 180-metre guyed mast for FM and TV broadcasting at Pietrăria, a village near Iaşi, Romania. It has a square cross section and is much thicker than most guyed masts of similar height.

The dendrological park of Repedea is in the transmitter's vicinity.

== See also ==
- List of tallest structures in Romania
- Seven hills of Iaşi
