= Margit Wein =

Hungarian opera singer, voice teacher (1861–1948)

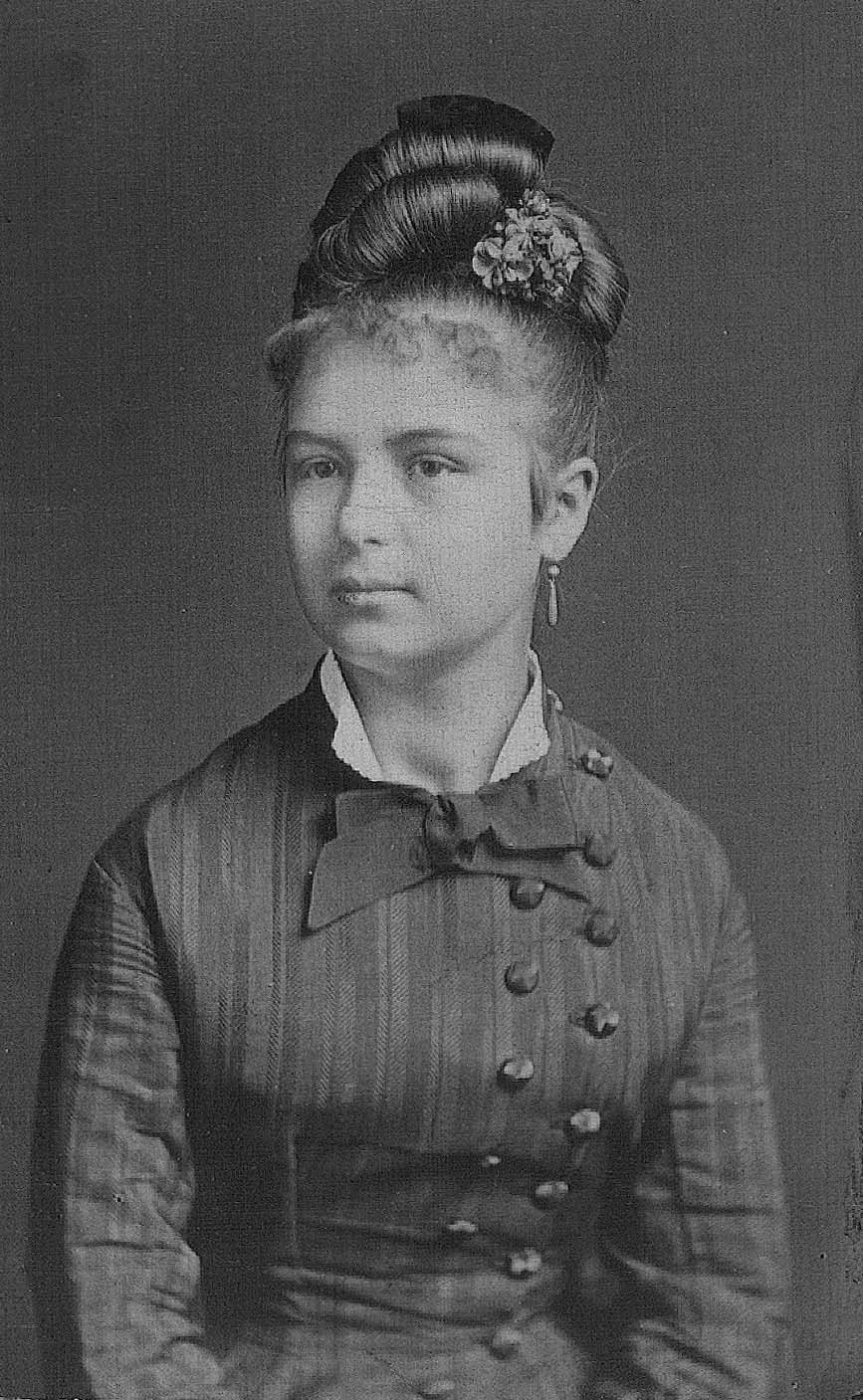

Background information
- Born: 15 December 1861; Lesnyek, Vețel, Hungary
- Died: 28 November 1948 (aged 86) Budapest
- Occupation: Opera singer

Margit Wein, Ábrányiné Wein Margit (15 December 1861 – 28 November 1948) was a Hungarian opera singer (soprano).

== Life ==
Her father, János Wein, was the first director and partly founder of the Budapest Water Works. Born in Lesnyek, part of Vețel, Wein graduated from the opera department of the University of Theatre and Film Arts in Budapest. 1 April 1884, she joined the National Theatre and was a member of the newly opened Hungarian State Opera House from September to 1899. During her farewell performance, the students of the Academy of Music protested her departure, as a result of which István Keglevich closed the student hostel. The incident received huge press coverage, and the matter was even discussed in parliament. After a long break, Keglevich allowed the girls back into the box, and assigned the boys the gallery. She also performed in Vienna (1897) and Cluj-Napoca.

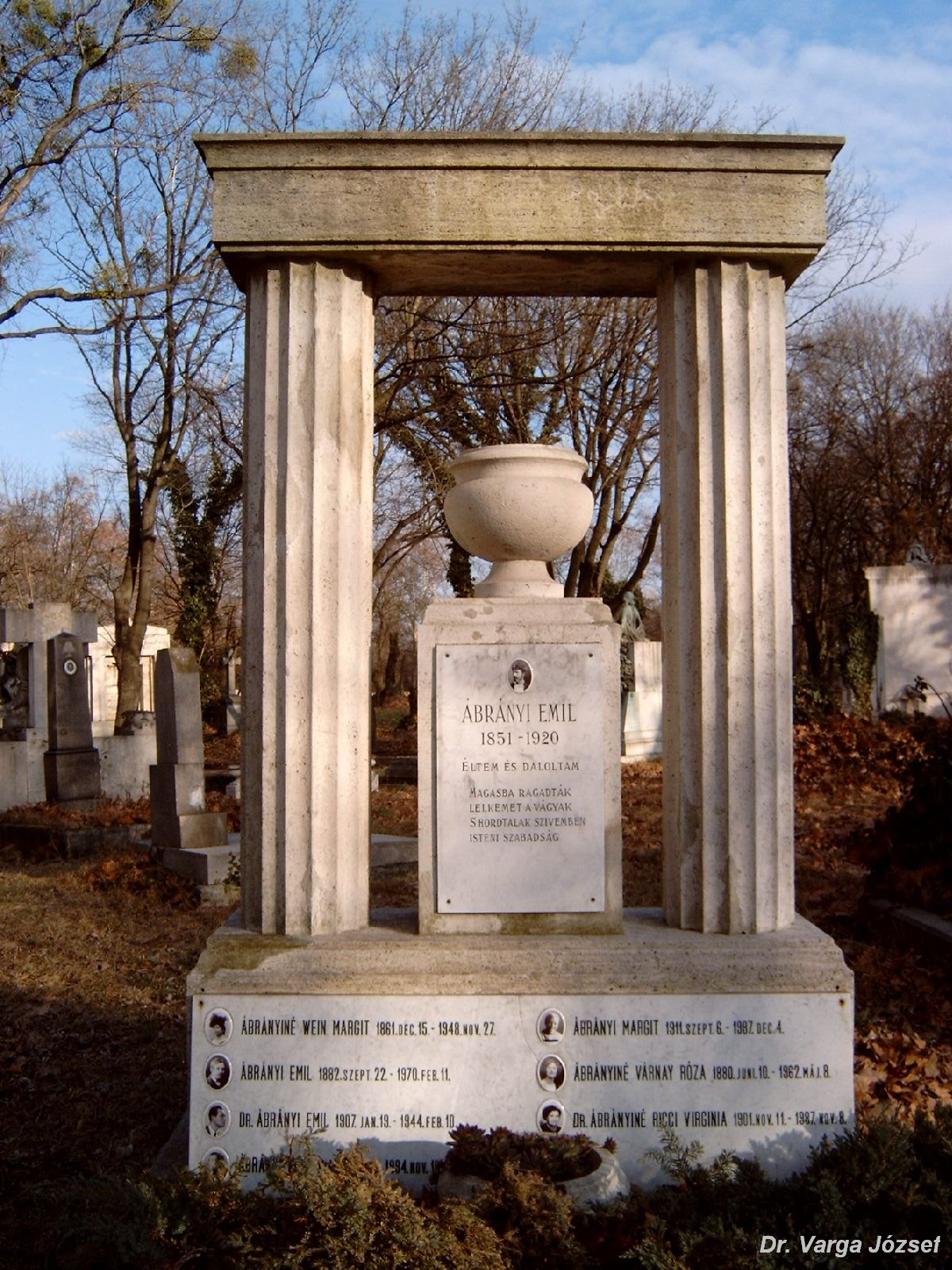
Margit Wein's grave in the Ábrányi family cemetery. Fiumei út cemetery: 37/2-1-33

== Death ==
In 1882 she married the poet Emil Ábrányi. Between 1901 and 1920 she was a teacher at the Franz Liszt Academy of Music. She was the first to sing the title roles of several operas in Budapest. Wein died in Budapest and is buried in the Fiume Road Graveyard with her husband and other members of the Ábrányi family.

== Important roles ==
- Daniel Auber: Le domino noir – Angela
- Daniel Auber: La muette de Portici – Princess
- Vincenzo Bellini: The Sleepwalker – Amina
- Gaetano Donizetti: La fille du régiment – Marie
- Gaetano Donizetti: Lucia of Lammermoor – title role
- Ferenc Erkel: Hunyadi László – Mária Gara
- Ferenc Erkel: The Lord of the Rings – Melinda
- Karl Goldmark: A házi tücsök – Dot
- Jenő Hubay: A falu rossza – Boriska
- Engelbert Humperdinck: Jancsi és Juliska – Jancsi
- Conradin Kreutzer: A granadai éji szállás – Gabrielle
- Ruggero Leoncavallo: Bajazzók – Nedda
- Ruggero Leoncavallo: Bohémek – Musetta
- Aimé Maillart: Villars dragonyosai – Rose Friquet
- Pietro Mascagni: Parasztbecsület – Lola
- Victor Massé: Jeanette menyegzője – Jeanette
- Giacomo Meyerbeer: A hugenották – Valois Margaret
- Giacomo Meyerbeer: Ördög Róbert – Isabella
- Giacomo Meyerbeer: L'Africaine – Inez
- Wolfgang Amadeus Mozart: Don Juan – Zerlina
- Wolfgang Amadeus Mozart: Figaro lakodalma – Cherubino
- Wolfgang Amadeus Mozart: A varázsfuvola – Pamina
- Gioachino Rossini: A sevillai borbély – Rosina
- Gioachino Rossini: Tell Vilmos – Matilda
- Bedřich Smetana: The Bartered Bride – Mařenka
- Ambroise Thomas: Mignon– Philine
- Ambroise Thomas: Hamlet – Ophelia
- Giuseppe Verdi: Rigoletto – Gilda
