= Vețel =

- Commune
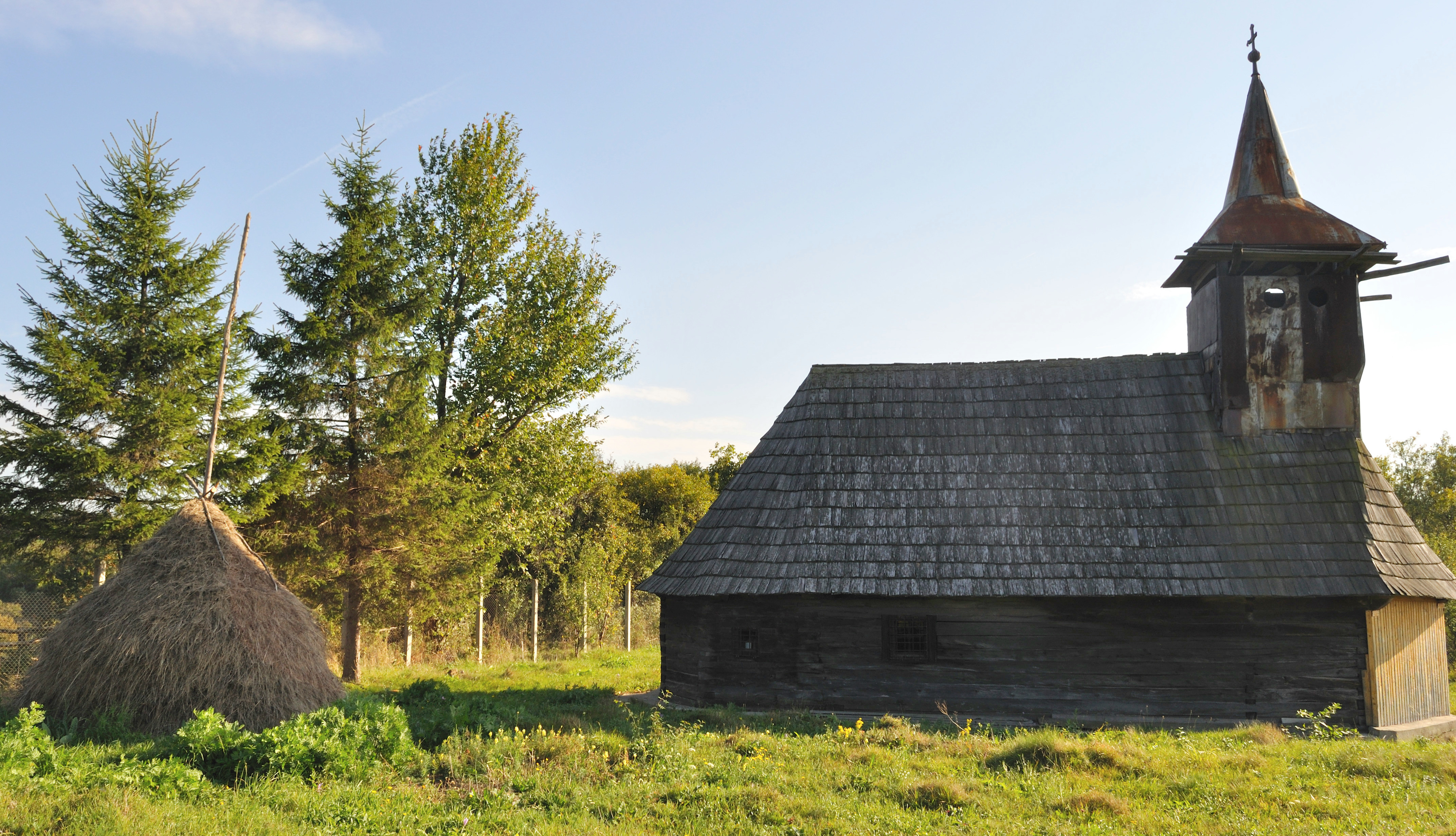
- Wooden church in Boia Bârzii

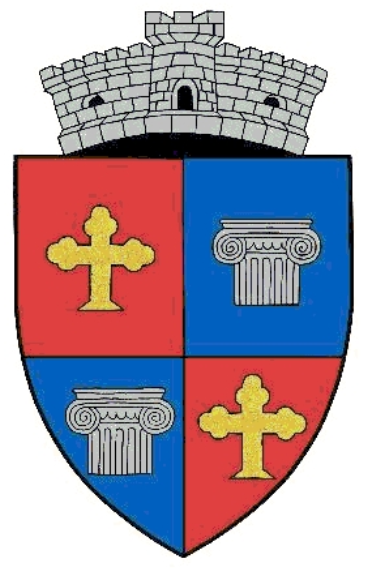
- Coat of arms

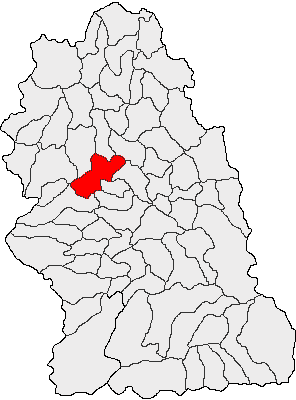
- Location in Hunedoara County

- Location in Romania
- Coordinates: 45°54′N 22°49′E
- Country: Romania
- County: Hunedoara

Government
  - Mayor (2024–2028): Gheorghe Capșa (PNL)
- Area: 113.89 km^{2} (43.97 sq mi)
- Elevation: 204 m (669 ft)
- Population (2021-12-01): 3,104
  - Density: 27.25/km^{2} (70.59/sq mi)
- Time zone: UTC+02:00 (EET)
  - Summer (DST): UTC+03:00 (EEST)
- Postal code: 337525
- Area code: +(40) 254
- Vehicle reg.: HD
- Website: primaria-vetel-hd.ro

Vețel (Hungarian: Vecel; German: Witzel) is a commune in Hunedoara County, Transylvania, Romania. It is composed of ten villages: Boia Bârzii (Bojabirz), Bretelin (Brettyelin), Căoi (Káun), Herepeia (Filimon Sîrbu between 1948 and 1964; Herepe), Leșnic (Lesnyek), Mintia (Marosnémeti; Bayersdorf), Muncelu Mare (Nagymuncsel), Muncelu Mic (Kismuncsel), Runcu Mic (Erdőhátrunk), and Vețel.

Historical population
Year	Pop.	±%
1850	2,583	—
1977	4,090	+58.3%
2002	2,760	−32.5%
2011	2,872	+4.1%
2021	3,104	+8.1%
Source: Census data

At the 2002 census, the commune had 2,760 inhabitants, of which 91.6% were Romanians, 4.7% Hungarians, and 3.6% Roma; 87.8% were Romanian Orthodox, 4.4% Pentecostal, 3.1% Roman Catholic, 2.1% Baptist, and 1.7% Reformed. At the 2021 census, Vețel had a population of 3,104; of those, 86.47% were Romanians, 3.67% Roma, and 1.1% Hungarians.

Mintia village is the site of the Mintia-Deva Power Station, as well as the 17th-century Reformed church of Mintia, which is on Romania's National Register of Historic Monuments.

== Natives ==
- Filimon Sârbu (1916–1941), communist activist and anti-fascist militant
- Margit Wein (1861-1948), opera singer (soprano)
