= Mintia-Deva Power Station =

Thermal power plant in Romania

Mintia-Deva Power Plant
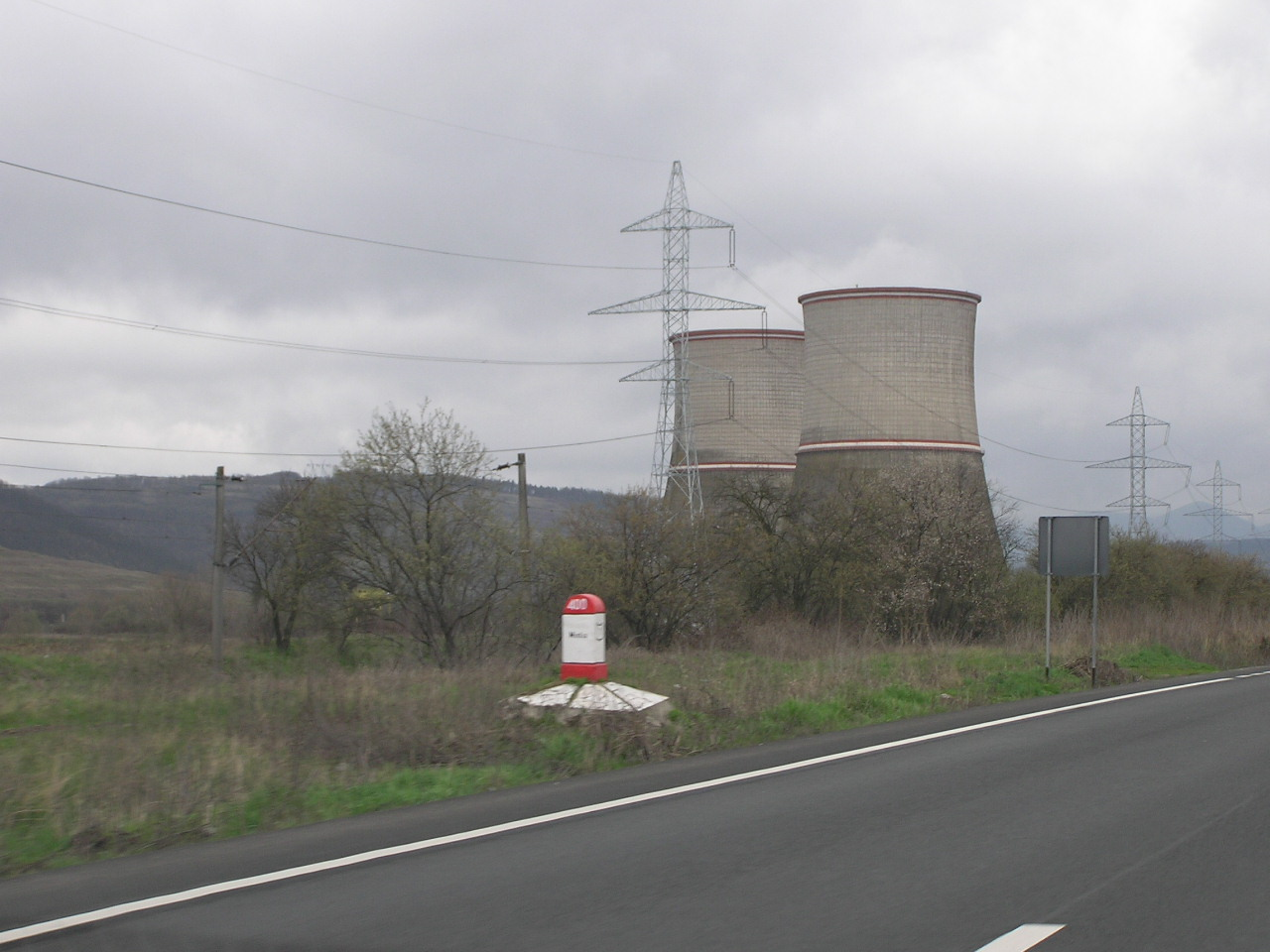
- Country: Romania
- Location: Vețel, Hunedoara County
- Coordinates: 45°54′48″N 22°49′32″E
- Status: Mothballed
- Commission date: 1969
- Owner: Mass Group Holding

Power generation
- Units decommissioned: 5 x 210 MW; 1 x 235 MW

External links
- Commons: Related media on Commons

The Mintia-Deva Power Plant was Romania's third largest thermal power plant having 5 identical groups of 210 MW each and one of 235 MW thus totalling a capacity of 1,285 MW. The primary fuel was bituminous coal mixed with natural gas.

The power plant is situated in Hunedoara County (South-Western Transylvania), on the banks of the Mureș River, 7 km (4.3 mi) from the city of Deva. The 3 chimneys of the power station are 220 m (720 ft) tall.

== Operations ==
The plant has been mothballed in early 2021. Reasons cited are lack of investment in emissions control, several years of poor management and political interference in the plant's management.

It was controlled by Electrocentrale Deva, a state-owned company. It was sold in 2022 to Mass Group Holding, an Iraqi company with headquarters in Jordan, for EUR 91.2 million. The transaction comes with strings attached, imposed by the Romania’s energy ministry, as a shareholder. These include the obligation for the buyer to complete a new 1,290 MW power unit, of which 800 MW is to be based on natural gas and renewable sources, by the end of 2026.

Unit	Capacity (MW)	Commissioned	Status
Mintia - 1	210	1969	decommissioned
Mintia - 2	210	1969 - 1971	decommissioned
Mintia - 3	210	1969 - 1971	decommissioned
Mintia - 4	210	1969 - 1971	decommissioned
Mintia - 5	210	1977	decommissioned
Mintia - 6	235	1980	decommissioned

== See also ==
- List of power stations in Romania
