= Anina Mine =

Mine in Romania

Anina Coal mine
Location
- Location: Anina, Caraș-Severin County, Romania

Production
- Products: Anthracite, lignite, brown coal and oil shale

History
- Opened: 1790
- Closed: 2006

Owner
- Company: Miniera Banat

Anina Coal Mine is an underground mine that is now closed. It was one of the largest mines in Romania. It is located in South-Western Romania, in Anina, Caraș-Severin County in the historical Banat region. The mine still has large reserves of anthracite, lignite, brown coal and oil shale amounting to over 1.3 billion tonnes. It was owned by Miniera Banat a state owned company that specialised in the management of coal mines in the Banat region. The mine opened in 1790 making it the longest running mine in Romania until its closure in 2006. Its galleries are hundreds of kilometers in length and reach a depth of 1,200 metres (3,900 ft) making it the deepest mine in Romania and one of the deepest in Europe. The mine supplied oil shale to the nearby Crivina Power Station, a 990 MW thermal power station, the first oil shale power station in Romania, that had to be supplied with around 4 million tonnes of oil shale per year.

The Anina mine was the site of many fatal accidents during its history, which claimed over 1,000 lives from its opening in 1790 to its closure in 2006.

== Reserves ==
The Anina mine still has large anthracite, lignite, brown coal and oil shale reserves amounting to over 840 million tonnes. The large share of these reserves is represented by oil shale with reserves amounting to 728 million tonnes and represents the largest oil shale reserves in Romania. Other important reserves include 83 million tonnes of anthracite, 26 million tonnes of brown coal and 6 million tonnes lignite.
