= Techirghiol TV Tower =

- Interactive map of the Techirghiol TV Tower area

General information
- Status: Completed
- Type: telecommunications
- Location: Techirghiol, Romania
- Coordinates: 44°2′12″N 28°37′25″E
- Owner: Societatea Nationala de Radiocomunicatii Radiocom

Height
- Antenna spire: 146 m (479 ft)

Technical details
- Floor count: 1

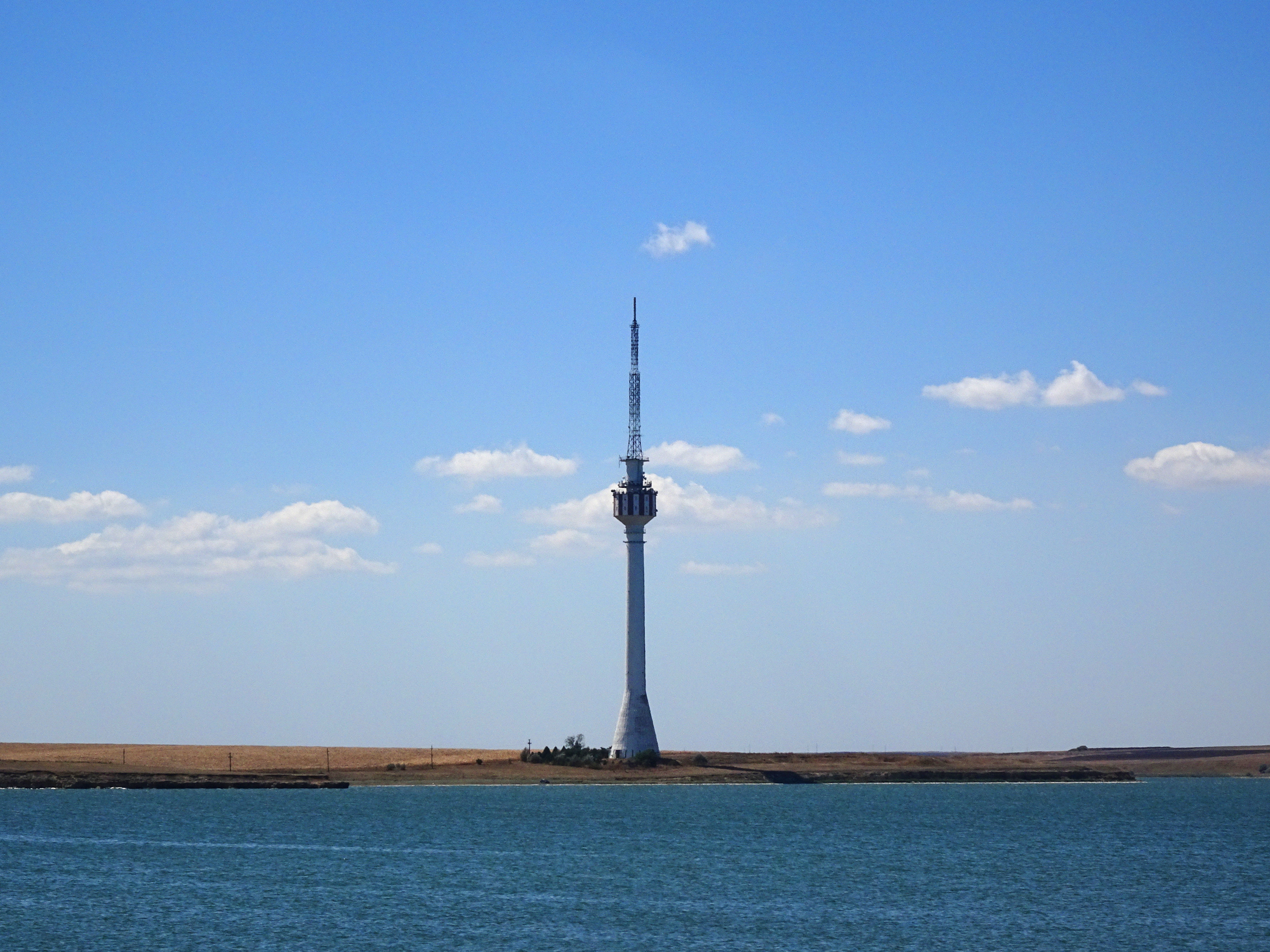
The Techirghiol TV tower

The Techirghiol TV Tower is a 146-meter high TV tower built of reinforced concrete at Techirghiol, Romania.

== See also ==
- List of towers
