= Galați Power Station =

Power station in Galați County, Romania

Galaţi Power Station
- Country: Romania
- Location: Galaţi
- Coordinates: 45°26′09″N 27°58′54″E
- Status: Decommissioned
- Decommission date: 2021
- Owner: Remat București Sud

Thermal power station
- Primary fuel: Natural gas and coke

Power generation
- Units decommissioned: 2 x 60 MW; 1 x 100 MW; 3 x 105 MW
- Nameplate capacity: 535 MW

The Galaţi Power Station was a large thermal power plant located in Galaţi, having various configurations of generation groups between 60 MW and 105 MW each having a total electricity generation capacity of 535 MW. In 1999, this was reduced to 375 MW, with one 60 MW and one 100 MW being decommissioned.

The plant went bankrupt in late 2020 and has since been decommissioned.
