= Remeți Hydroelectric Power Station =

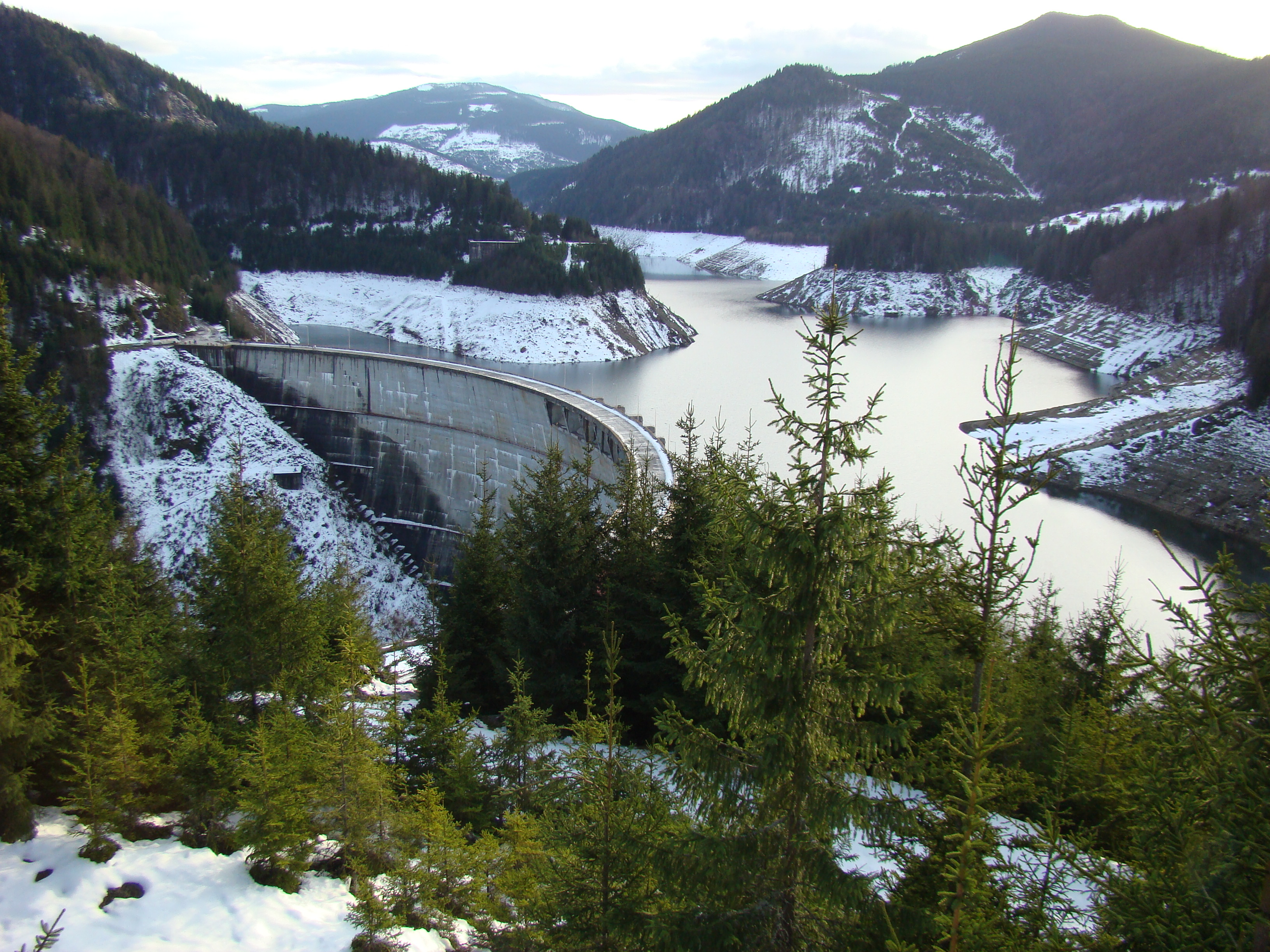

- Location within Romania
- Country: Romania
- Location: Remeţi, Romania
- Coordinates: 46.831°N 22.684°E

Reservoir
- Creates: Remeţi
- Total capacity: 112 million cubic metres (91,000 acre⋅ft)
- Surface area: 1 km^{2} (0.39 sq mi)

Remeți Hydroelectric Power Station

Remeţi Hydro Power Plant is a large power plant on the Drăgan River in Romania.

== See also ==
- Porţile de Fier I
- Porţile de Fier II
