= Ruieni Hydroelectric Power Station =

- Interactive map of Ruieni Hydroelectric Power Station
- Country: Romania
- Location: Turnu Ruieni, Caraș-Severin County

Reservoir
- Creates: Ruieni
- Total capacity: 96.2 million cubic metres (78,000 acre⋅ft)
- Surface area: 1 km^{2} (0.39 sq mi)

Ruieni Hydroelectric Power Station

Ruieni Hydroelectric Power Plant is a large power plant on the Sebeș River situated in Romania.

The project was started and finished in the 1990s and it was made up by the construction of a rockfill with a clay core dam 125 m (410 ft) high which was equipped with two vertical turbines, the hydropower plant having an installed capacity of 153 MW.

The power plant generated 264 GWh of electricity.

== See also ==
- Iron Gate I Hydroelectric Power Station
- Iron Gate II Hydroelectric Power Station
