= Tismana Hydroelectric Power Station =

Motru Dam
- Interactive map of Motru Dam
- Official name: Barajul Motru
- Location: Romania
- Coordinates: 45°2′39.84″N 22°56′51″E
- Opening date: 1982

Dam and spillways
- Impounds: Motru River
- Height: 48 m (157 ft)
- Length: 370 m (1,210 ft)

Reservoir
- Creates: Motru Lake
- Total capacity: 4,800,000 m^{3} (170,000,000 cu ft)
- Catchment area: 79 km^{2} (31 mi^{2})
- Surface area: 0.37 km^{2} (0.14 mi^{2})

Power Station
- Installed capacity: 106 MW
- Annual generation: 262 GWh

Tismana Hydro Power Plant is a large power plant on the Motru River situated in Romania.

The project was started in 1979 and finished in 1982 and it was made up by the construction of an arched concrete dam 48 m (157 ft) high which was equipped with two vertical turbines, the hydropower plant having an installed capacity of 106 MW.

The power plant generates 262 GWh of electricity per year.

== See also ==
- Iron Gate I Hydroelectric Power Station
- Iron Gate II Hydroelectric Power Station
