= Craiova II Power Station =

Power station in Craiova, Romania

- Country: Romania
- Location: Craiova
- Coordinates: 44.3452°N 23.8156°E
- Status: Operational
- Owner: Electrocentrale Craiova

Thermal power station
- Primary fuel: Natural gas and coal

Power generation
- Units operational: 2 x 150 MW
- Units planned: 1 x 295 MW
- Nameplate capacity: 300 MW

The Craiova II Power Station is a large thermal power plant located in Craiova, Romania, having 2 generation groups of 150 MW each having a total electricity generation capacity of 300 MW.

== Operations ==
Unit	Capacity (MW)	Commissioned	Status
Craiova - 1	150		operational
Craiova - 2	150		operational
Craiova - 3	295		proposed

== Future extensions ==
There were plans to add another generating group of 150 MW at Craiova II Power Station that will result a total power generating capacity of 450 MW at a cost of US$225 million. These plans were abandoned.

There are plans to add another generating group of 295 MW using natural gas as fuel.
