= Brăila Power Station =

- Country: Romania
- Location: Brăila
- Coordinates: 45°9′54″N 27°55′24″E
- Status: Decommissioned
- Owner: Complexul Energetic Oltenia

Thermal power station
- Primary fuel: Natural gas and coal

Power generation
- Units decommissioned: 2 x 3 MW; 2 x 210 MW; 1 x 330 MW; 2 x 25 MW; 1 x 50 MW

The Brăila Power Station was a large thermal power plant located in Brăila, with 8 generation groups, 2 of 3 MW, 2 of 210 MW, 2 of 25 MW, 1 of 50 MW and 1 of 330 MW totaling electricity installed capacity of 856 MW. Its two chimneys are 250 metres and 200 metres tall.

It's being prepared to be sold.

== Operations ==
Unit	Capacity (MW)	Commissioned	Status
Braila - 1	3	1955	decommissioned
Braila - 2	3	1955	decommissioned
Braila - 3	210	1973-1974	decommissioned
Braila - 4	210	1973-1974	decommissioned
Braila - 5	330	1979	decommissioned
Braila - 6	25	1982-1984	decommissioned
Braila - 7	25	1982-1984	decommissioned
Braila - 8	50	1982-1984	decommissioned

== See also ==
- List of power stations in Romania
