= Ișalnița Power Station =

Işalniţa Power Station
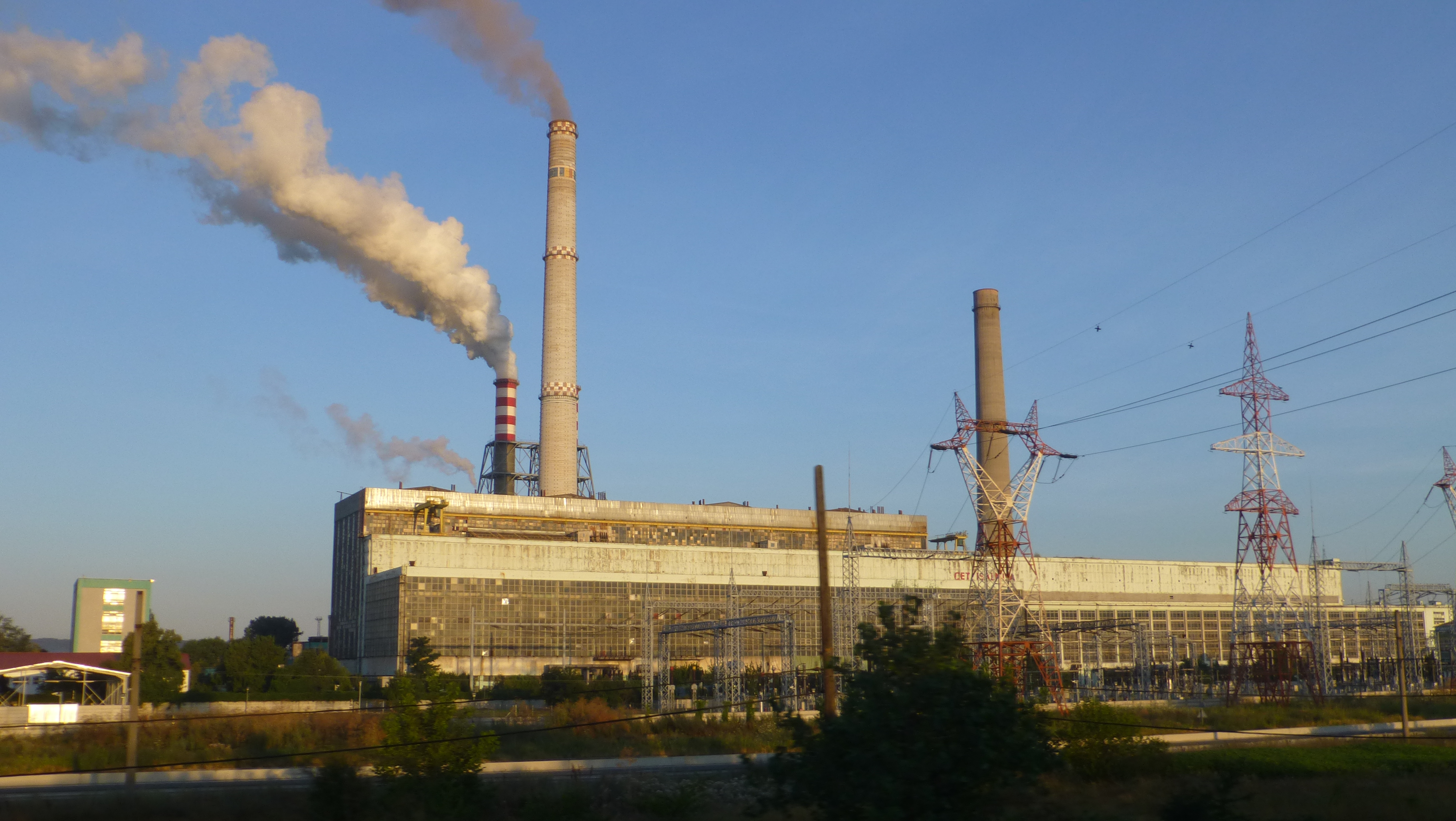
- Country: Romania
- Location: Işalniţa, Dolj County
- Coordinates: 44°23′15″N 23°43′5″E
- Status: Operational
- Commission date: 1968
- Owner: Complexul Energetic Oltenia

Thermal power station
- Primary fuel: Lignite, natural gas

Power generation
- Units operational: 1 x 315 MW (mothballed)
- Units planned: 1 x 850 MW
- Units decommissioned: 1 x 315 MW
- Nameplate capacity: 315 MW

External links
- Commons: Related media on Commons

The Işalniţa Power Station is a thermal power plant located in Işalniţa, Dolj County operating with one generating unit of 315 MW.

The tallest chimney of the power station is 200 metres tall.

== Future extensions ==
A consortium formed by Alstom, Sumitomo and IHI Corporation was commissioned to upgrade the 315 MW group to 345 MW each at a total cost of US$315 million.

There were plans to add another generating group of 500 MW at Işalniţa Power Station at a cost of US$750 million. The plans were later canceled.

There are plans with Alro Slatina for construction of a new unit of 850 MW that will use natural gas as fuel.

== Operations ==
The recovery and resilience plan for Romania included decommissioning of Unit 8, which was achieved in 2021.

Unit 7 stopped production from January 1, 2024 and was put in reserve, according with Complex Energetic Oltenia's plan to restructure the company. It will be in reserve until the end of 2025, after which it will be decommissioned.

| Unit | Capacity (MW) | Commissioned | Status |
|---|---|---|---|
| Ișalnița - 1 | 50 | | decommissioned |
| Ișalnița - 2 | 50 | | decommissioned |
| Ișalnița - 3 | 50 | | decommissioned |
| Ișalnița - 4 | 55 | | decommissioned |
| Ișalnița - 5 | 100 | | decommissioned |
| Ișalnița - 6 | 100 | | decommissioned |
| Ișalnița - 7 | 315 | | mothballed |
| Ișalnița - 8 | 315 | | decommissioned |
