= Anina =

- Town
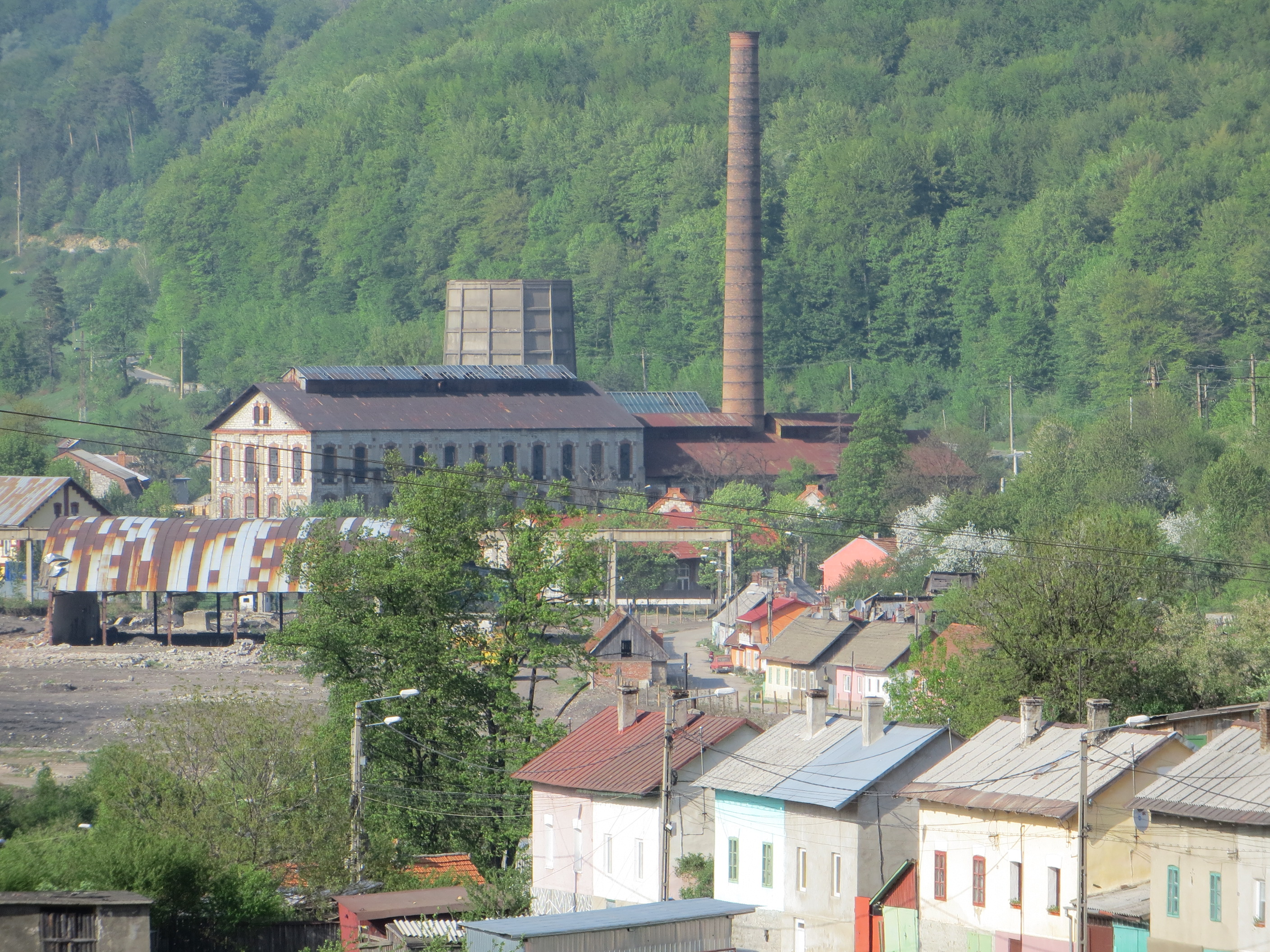
- Anina Iron Works

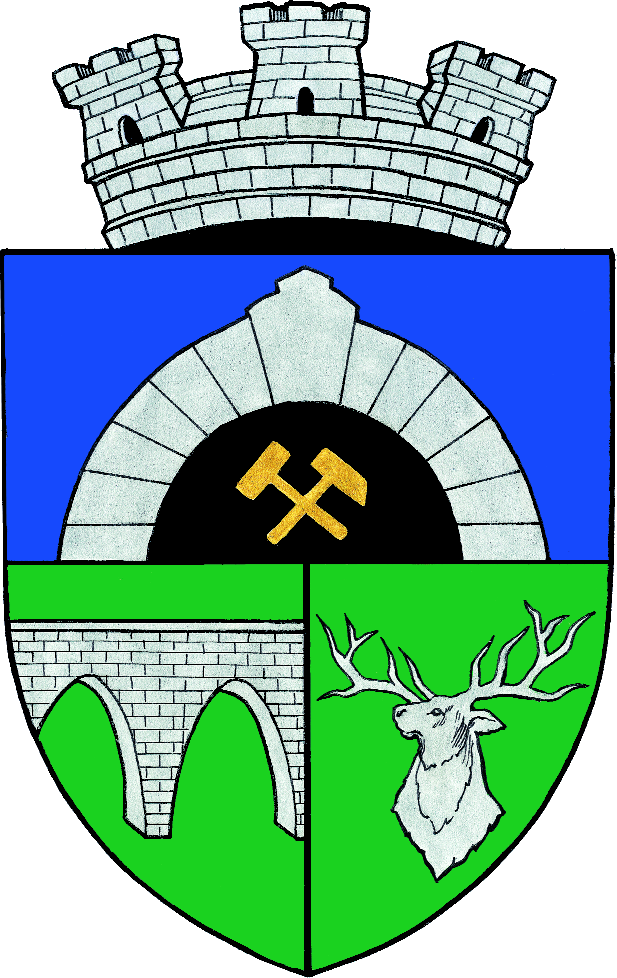
- Coat of arms

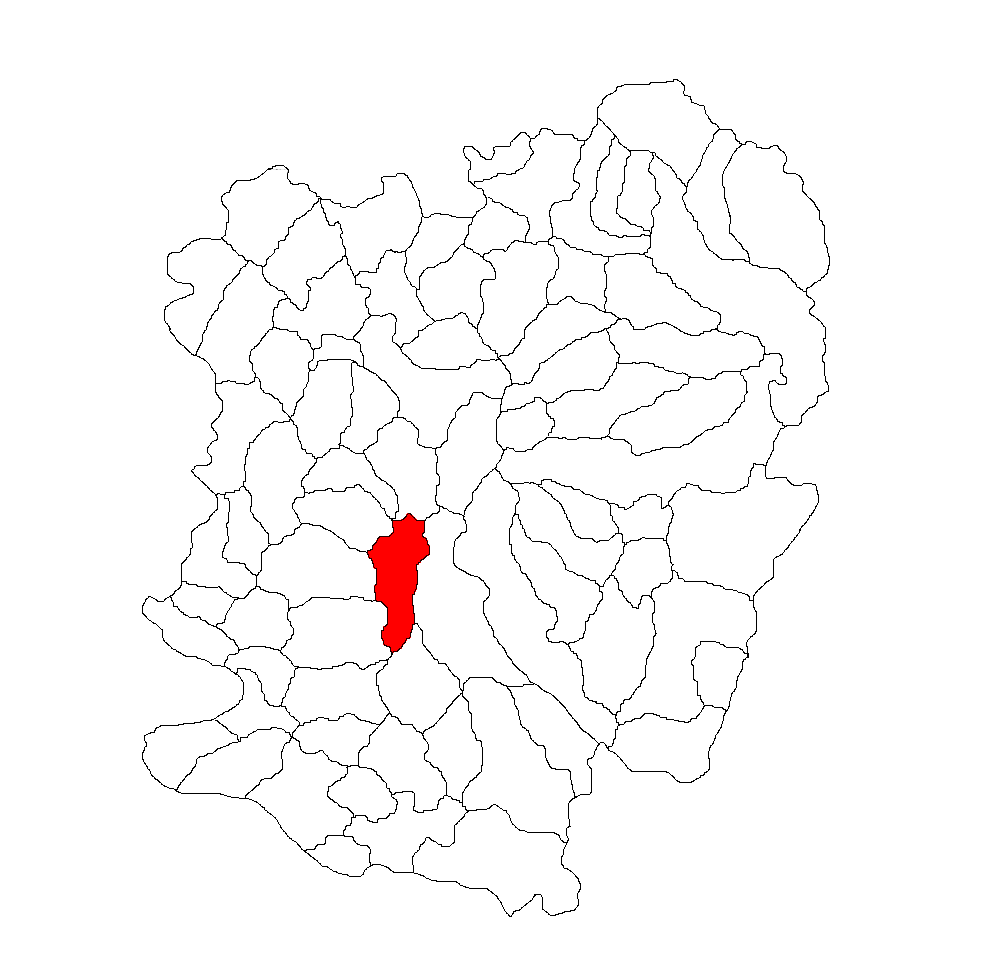
- Location in Caraș-Severin County

- Location in Romania
- Coordinates: 45°5′30″N 21°51′12″E
- Country: Romania
- County: Caraș-Severin

Government
  - Mayor (2024–2028): Gheorghe Românu (PNL)
- Area: 145.53 km^{2} (56.19 sq mi)
- Elevation: 600 m (2,000 ft)
- Population (2021-12-01): 5,521
  - Density: 37.94/km^{2} (98.26/sq mi)
- Time zone: UTC+02:00 (EET)
  - Summer (DST): UTC+03:00 (EEST)
- Postal code: 325100
- Area code: (+40) 02 55
- Vehicle reg.: CS
- Website: www.primaria-anina.ro

Anina (Romanian pronunciation: ['anina]; German: Steierdorf; Hungarian: Stájerlakanina) is a town in the Banat region of Romania, in Caraș-Severin County, with a population of 5,521 in 2021. The town administers one village, Steierdorf (German: Steierdorf, Hungarian: Stájerlak).

== Geology ==
Anina represents one of the most important localities in the Southern Carpathians for Jurassic fossils, both plants and animals, as the geological heritage here is particularly diverse and well preserved (Popa, 2001, 2005). Anina is a fossil-Lagerstatte for Early Jurassic biota, the Hettangian-Sinemurian terrestrial Steierdorf Formation recording an extremely rich floral association, vertebrate and invertebrate tracks, traces and burrows. This paleontological heritage was uncovered also by significant mining works, such as underground mines and open cast mines, such works permitting the three-dimensional studies of the continental deposits, a unique opportunity in Europe and in the world, until the unfortunate closing of the last major mine in 2006. Still, the sterile dumps of the former mines and the former open cast mines of Ponor and Colonia Cehă very are rich in plant material, and they represent the subject of local conservation, as preserved sites or Sites of Special Scientific Interest (SSSI).

The Early Jurassic (Hettangian - Sinemurian) flora is represented by Bryophytes (Hepaticae), Pteridophytes (Filicopsida, Sphenopsida, Lycopsida) and Gymnosperms (Pteridospermopsida, Ginkgopsida, Cycadopsida, Coniferopsida), with numerous coal generators (Givulescu, 1998, Popa and Van Konijnenburg - Van Cittert, 2005). Very rare vertebrate tunnels were recently described (Popa and Kedzior, 2006), such burrows being formerly reported only from three occurrences in the world (South Africa, Arizona and Argentina), tetrapod tracks such as Batrachopus cf. deweyi (Popa, 2000), and sauropod tracks of Parabrontopodus sp. type (Pienkowski et al., 2009).

The Middle Jurassic marine formations are also extremely rich in marine invertebrates and drifted floral remains, while the Upper Jurassic and Lower Cretaceous units display basinal and carbonate platform features (Bucur, 1997).

== Human geography ==
Historical population
Year	Pop.	±%
1956	11,837	—
1966	14,063	+18.8%
1977	11,478	−18.4%
1992	11,329	−1.3%
2002	10,594	−6.5%
2011	7,485	−29.3%
2021	5,521	−26.2%
Source: Census data

In 2002, the oldest modern human remains in Europe were discovered in a cave near Anina. Nicknamed "Ion din Anina" (John of Anina), the remains (the lower jaw) are some 40,000 years old.

The coal mining industrial heritage is significant, with Austrian industrial architecture and pits still preserved, such as the Northern Pit (Anina Pit I), Pit II, Pit IV (next to the Terezia Valley). Coal mining activities began in 1792, after the first coal outcrop was discovered by Matthew Hammer.

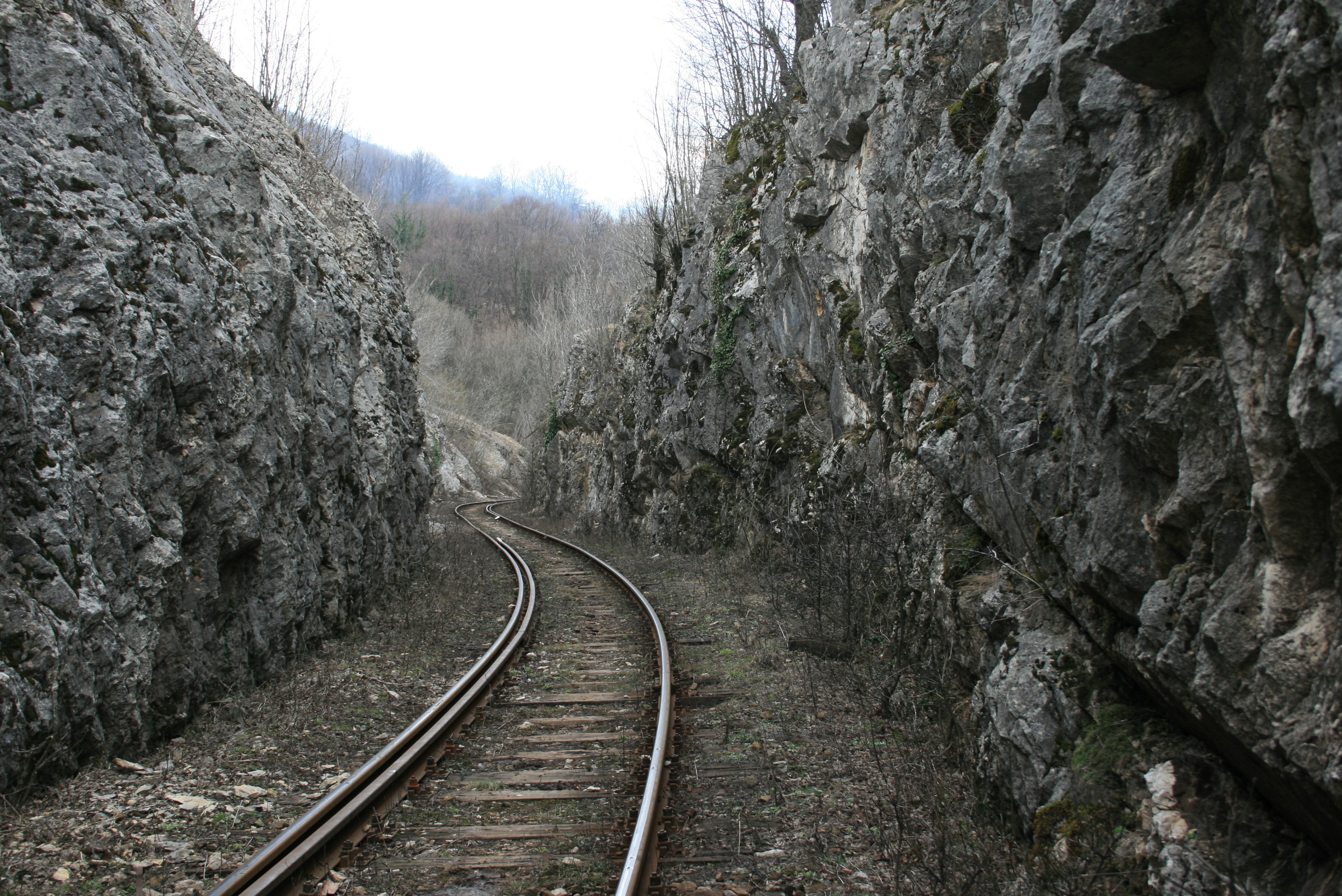
View from Oravița – Anina mountain railway in 2010

The Anina-Oravița railway built in 1863 is still in use today for touristic purposes. It is known for its landscapes, viaducts and long tunnels. The railway preserves many aspects of the original design and, as such, it does not comply with many UIC standards and it needs special, more powerful locomotives and shorter rail coaches to operate.

== Climate ==
Anina has a humid continental climate (Cfb in the Köppen climate classification).

Climate data for Anina
Month	Jan	Feb	Mar	Apr	May	Jun	Jul	Aug	Sep	Oct	Nov	Dec	Year
Mean daily maximum °C (°F)	1 (34)	2.8 (37.0)	7.5 (45.5)	13.3 (55.9)	17.7 (63.9)	21 (70)	23 (73)	23.3 (73.9)	18.3 (64.9)	13.5 (56.3)	8.3 (46.9)	2.5 (36.5)	12.7 (54.8)
Daily mean °C (°F)	−2.3 (27.9)	−0.9 (30.4)	3.2 (37.8)	8.7 (47.7)	13.3 (55.9)	16.7 (62.1)	18.6 (65.5)	18.7 (65.7)	14.1 (57.4)	9.1 (48.4)	4.5 (40.1)	−0.7 (30.7)	8.6 (47.5)
Mean daily minimum °C (°F)	−5.6 (21.9)	−4.4 (24.1)	−1.2 (29.8)	3.7 (38.7)	8.3 (46.9)	11.8 (53.2)	13.7 (56.7)	13.9 (57.0)	9.9 (49.8)	5.3 (41.5)	1.4 (34.5)	−3.5 (25.7)	4.4 (40.0)
Average precipitation mm (inches)	66 (2.6)	62 (2.4)	68 (2.7)	90 (3.5)	93 (3.7)	110 (4.3)	92 (3.6)	75 (3.0)	79 (3.1)	65 (2.6)	63 (2.5)	74 (2.9)	937 (36.9)
Source: https://en.climate-data.org/europe/romania/caras-severin/anina-15645/

== Natives ==
- Franz Rosenberger (1895 – 1967), composer
- Geza Slovig (1897 – 1944), church musician, music educator, and composer
- Alexandru Rogobete (born 1991), politician
- Ion Timofte (born 1967), footballer

== See also ==
- Anina Mine
- Anina-Doman oil field
- Peștera Muierilor
- Peștera cu Oase
