= Termoelectrica =

- Company type: State owned
- Industry: Electricity
- Founded: 2000
- Headquarters: Bucharest, Romania
- Key people: Viorel Marian (CEO)
- Revenue: US$346 million (2007)
- Number of employees: 1,683 (2006)
- Website: www.termoelectrica.ro

Termoelectrica is a Romanian state-owned company, its shares being held by the Romania Ministry of Industry, which has as main objective power generation with mostly fossil fuels, and also 19 thermal power plants.

Termoelectrica owns three subsidiaries with a total installed capacity of 1,717 MW and an annual average power production of 5.910 TWh, 9.64% of the total national output of Romania.

== Subsidiaries ==
Electrocentrale Bucharest
- Company type: Public
- Industry: electricity
- Founded: 2003
- Headquarters: Bucharest, Romania
- Key people: Ion Marcu, CEO
- Revenue: US$ 1.01 billion (2007)
- Number of employees: 2,719 (2007)
- Parent: state owned
- Website: www.elcen.ro

Electrocentrale Bucharest is a Romanian state-owned company, its shares being held by Termoelectrica which has as main objective power generation with thermal power plants.

Electrocentrale Bucharest owns three subsidiaries with a total installed capacity of 2,008 MW and an annual average power production of 6.759 TWh, which is 12.7% of the total national output of Romania.

== See also ==
- Energy law
