= List of Bucharest metro stations =

This is a list of the stations on the Bucharest Metro rapid transit system in Bucharest, Romania. There are 64 stations in the Bucharest Metro.

== Lines ==
=== In operation ===
- Line 1: Dristor 2 — Pantelimon
- Line 2: Pipera — Tudor Arghezi
- Line 3: Preciziei — Anghel Saligny
- Line 4: Străulești — Gara de Nord 2
- Line 5: Râul Doamnei/Valea Ialomiței — Eroilor 2

=== Under construction ===
- Line 6: 1 Mai — Aeroport Otopeni

== Stations ==
For each of the 64 stations, the list reports the lines serving it, the opening year and the statistics of passenger usage; the English translation of the name (in quotes) and other names previously used (in italics) are listed, where available, in the second last column. Interchange ^{(i)} and terminal stations ^{(t)} are in bold.

Station	Line(s)	Opened	Notes	Usage pass./year (million)
1 Decembrie 1918	M3	2008		3.09
1 Mai^{(i)(t)}	M4; M6	2000 (1 Mai 1) 2027 (1 Mai 2)	• 'May 1'	1.63
Academia Militară	M5	2020	• 'Military Academy'	0.059
**Aeroport Băneasa**	M6	2027	• 'Băneasa Airport'	
**Aeroport Otopeni**	M6	2027	• 'Otopeni Airport'	
**Anghel Saligny^{(t)}**	M3	2008	• Linia de Centură (2008–2009)	0.76
Apărătorii Patriei	M2	1986	• 'Defenders of the Fatherland'	4.21
Aurel Vlaicu	M2	1987		8.12
Aviatorilor	M2	1987	• '[of the] Aviators'	4.78
**Basarab^{(i)}**	M1 M4 M6	1992 (original platforms); 2000 (widened platforms)		2.59
**Berceni^{(t)}**	M2	1986	• Depoul I.M.G.B. (1986–2009)	0.54
**Bruxelles**	M6	2027		
Constantin Brâncoveanu	M2	1988		3.87
Constantin Brâncuși	M5	2020		0.072
Costin Georgian	M1	1981	• Muncii (1981–1992)	2.72
Crângași	M1	1984		5.62
Dimitrie Leonida	M2	1986	• I.M.G.B. (1986–2009)	4.17
**Dristor^{(i)(t)}**	M1 M3	1981 (Dristor 1); 1989 (Dristor 2)		7.13
Eroii Revoluției	M2	1986	• 'Heroes of the Revolution'; • Pieptănari (1986–1990)	5.20
**Eroilor^{(i)(t)}**	M1 M3; M5	1979 (Eroilor 1); 2020 (Eroilor 2)	• '[of the] Heroes'	3.90; 0.043
Expoziției	M6	2027		
Favorit	M5	2020	• 'Favorite'	0.074
**Gara Băneasa**	M6	2027	• 'Băneasa Railway station'	
**Gara de Nord^{(t)}**	M1 M4M6	1987 (Gara de Nord 1); 2000 (Gara de Nord 2)	• 'Northern Railway station'	5.07; 0.28
Gorjului	M3	1994 (outbound platform); 1998 (inbound platform)		4.19
Grivița	M4 M6	2000		0.63
Grozăvești	M1	1979		3.02
Izvor	M1 M3	1979	• 'Spring'	2.85
Ion I.C Brătianu	M6	2027		
Jiului	M4	2011	• Pajura (proposed before opening)	0.94
Laminorului	M4	2017	• '[of the] Rolling Mill'; • Laromet (proposed before opening)	0.61
Lujerului	M3	1983	• Armata Poporului (1983–2009)	5.09
Mihai Bravu	M1 M3	1981	• 'Michael the Brave'	2.18
Nicolae Grigorescu	M1 M3	1981 (Nicolae Grigorescu 1); 2008 (Nicolae Grigorescu 2)	• Leontin Sălăjan (1981–1990)	3.99
Nicolae Teclu	M3	2008	• Policolor (2008–2009)	0.70
Obor	M1	1989		6.12
Orizont	M5	2020	• 'Horizon'	0.044
Otopeni	M6	2027		
Păcii	M3	1983	• '[of] Peace'	4.59
**Pajura**	M6	2027		
**Pantelimon^{(t)}**	M1	1991	• Antilopa (former alternate name)	0.66
Parc Bazilescu	M4	2011	• 'Bazilescu Park'	0.54
Parc Drumul Taberei	M5	2020	• 'Camp Road Park'	0.67 (2022)
**Paris**	M6	2027		
Petrache Poenaru	M1	1979	• Semănătoarea (1979–2009)	1.80
Piața Iancului	M1	1989	• 'Iancului Square'	3.50
Piața Montreal	M6	2027	• 'Montreal Square'	
Piața Muncii	M1	1989	• 'Labour Square'	3.06
Piața Romană	M2	1988	• 'Roman Square'	6.12
Piața Sudului	M2	1986	• 'South Square'	6.93
**Piața Victoriei^{(i)}**	M1 M2	1987 (Piața Victoriei 1); 1989 (Piața Victoriei 2)	• 'Victory Square'	7.25
**Piața Unirii^{(i)}**	M1 M2 M3	1979 (Piața Unirii 1); 1986 (Piața Unirii 2)	• 'Union Square'	12.96
**Pipera^{(t)}**	M2	1987		6.43
Politehnica	M3	1983		4.31
**Preciziei^{(t)}**	M3	1983	• '[of] Precision'; • Industriilor (1983–2009)	3.15
**Râul Doamnei^{(t)}**	M5	2020	• 'The Lady's River'	0.077
Republica	M1	1981	• 'the Republic'	2.33
Romancierilor	M5	2020	• '[of the] Novelists'	0.068
Ștefan cel Mare	M1	1989	• 'Stephen the Great'	3.91
**Străulești^{(t)}**	M4	2017		0.69
Timpuri Noi	M1 M3	1979	• 'New Times'	4.17
Tineretului	M2	1986	• '[of the] Youth'	2.75
Titan	M1	1981		3.22
Tudor Arghezi^{(t)}	M2	2023		
Tudor Vladimirescu	M5	2020	• Drumul Taberei 34 (proposed before opening)	0.057
Tokyo	M6	2027		
Universitate	M2	1987	• 'University'	6.51
**Valea Ialomiței^{(t)}**	M5	2020	• 'Ialomița Valley'	0.068
**Washington**	M6	2027		

== Extensions ==
=== M4 (green line) ===
Line M4, opened in 2000, currently runs from Gara de Nord to Străulești in the city's northwest. A southward extension to Gara Progresul railway station is under study, with a view to starting construction works in the near future.

- Știrbei Vodă
- Hașdeu (transfer: Metro M5)
- Uranus
- George Rozorea
- Chirigiu
- Filaret
- Eroii Revoluției (transfer: Metro M2)
- George Bacovia
- Toporași
- Nicolae Cajal
- Luică
- Giurgiului
- Gara Progresul

=== M5 (orange line) ===
Line M5 is the newest line, opened in 2020 from Eroilor to Râul Doamnei and Valea Ialomiței in the city's southwest. A two-stage extension to Piața Iancului and further to Pantelimon is planned, due to open in 2023 and 2030 respectively.

- Hașdeu (transfer: Metro M4)
- Cișmigiu
- Universitate (transfer: Metro M2)
- Calea Moșilor
- Traian
- Piața Iancului (transfer: Metro M1)
- Victor Manu
- Arena Națională
- Chișinău
- Morarilor
- Sfântul Pantelimon
- Vergului (transfer: Metro M1 at Pantelimon)

=== M6 (pink line) ===
Line M6 is designed to connect two important transportation hubs: the Gara de Nord railway station and the Henri Coandă International Airport in Otopeni, passing near Băneasa railway station and Aurel Vlaicu International Airport.

- Gara de Nord M4 (transfer: Metro M1, CFR station)
- Basarab M4 (transfer: Metro M1, CFR station)
- Grivița M4
- 1 Mai M4
- Pajura
- Expoziției
- Piața Montreal
- Gara Băneasa (transfer: CFR station)
- Aeroportul Băneasa
- Tokyo
- Washington
- Paris
- Bruxelles
- Otopeni
- Ion I. C. Brătianu
- Aeroportul Otopeni
