= Tudor Vladimirescu metro station =

Bucharest metro station

Tudor Vladimirescu
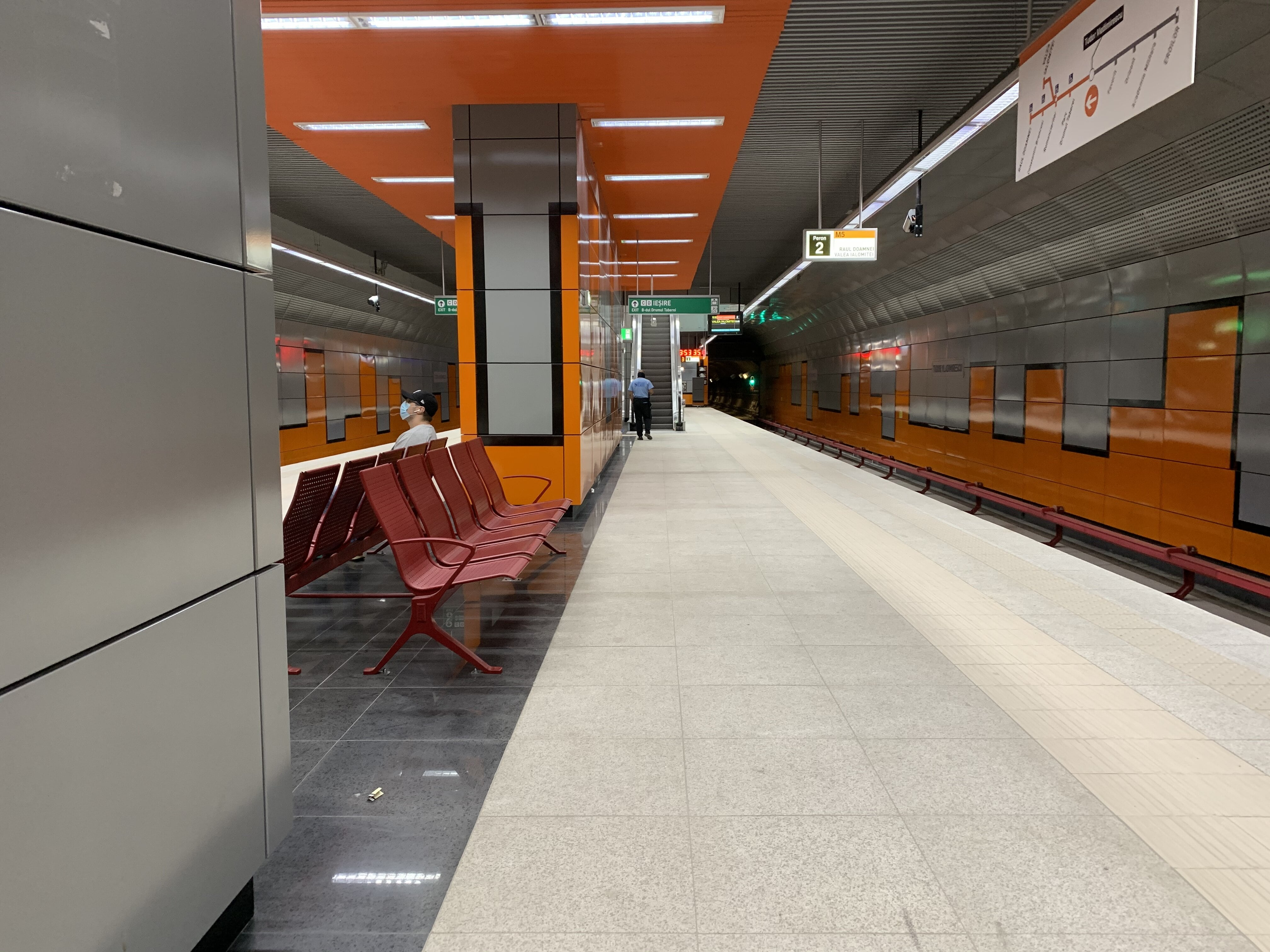
- Tudor Vladimirescu metro station platform

General information
- Location: Sector 6, Bucharest; Romania
- Coordinates: 44°25′23.2″N 26°2′29.4″E
- Platforms: 1 island platform
- Tracks: 2
- Bus routes: 105, 168, 368.

Construction
- Structure type: underground

History
- Opened: 15 September 2020

Services
Preceding station	Bucharest Metro	Following station
Parc Drumul Taberei towards Râul Doamnei or Valea Ialomiței	Line M5	Favorit towards Eroilor
Location

Tudor Vladimirescu is a station on line M5 of Bucharest Metro. Named after the Romanian revolutionary Tudor Vladimirescu, it is located between Favorit and Parc Drumul Taberei. The station was opened on 15 September 2020 as part of the inaugural section of M5, from Eroilor to Valea Ialomiței and Râul Doamnei.
