= Orizont metro station =

Bucharest metro station

Orizont
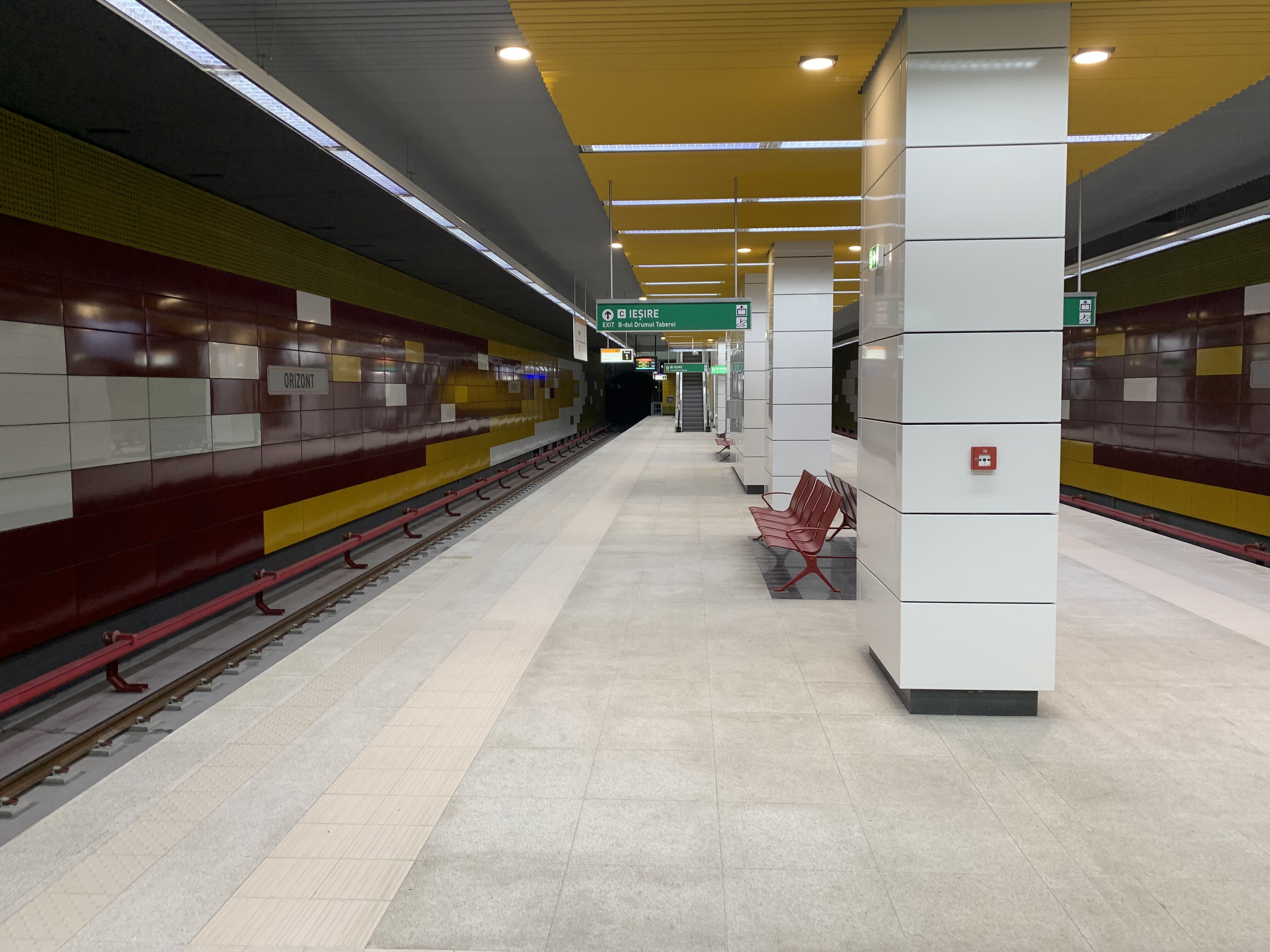
- Orizont metro station platform

General information
- Location: Sector 6, Bucharest; Romania
- Coordinates: 44°25′33.6″N 26°3′25.4″E
- Platforms: 1 island platform
- Tracks: 2
- Bus routes: 69, 93, 105, 139, 168, 368, 487.

Construction
- Structure type: underground

History
- Opened: 15 September 2020

Services
Preceding station	Bucharest Metro	Following station
Favorit towards Râul Doamnei or Valea Ialomiței	Line M5	Academia Militară towards Eroilor
Location

Orizont is a station on line M5 of Bucharest Metro. It is located between Academia Militară and Favorit. The station was opened on 15 September 2020 as part of the inaugural section of M5, from Eroilor to Valea Ialomiței and Râul Doamnei.
