= Favorit metro station =

Bucharest metro station

Favorit
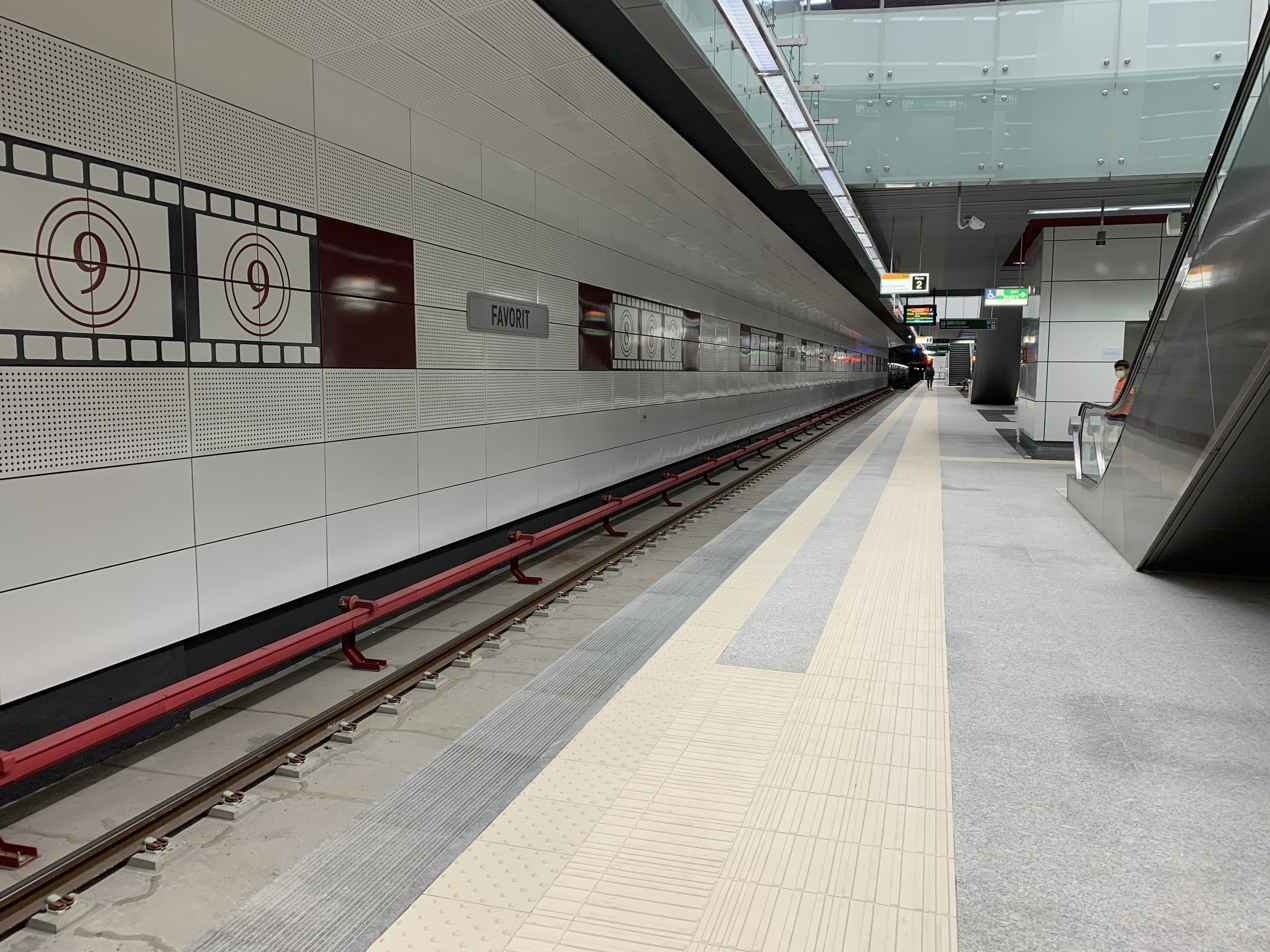
- Favorit metro station platform

General information
- Location: Sector 6, Bucharest; Romania
- Coordinates: 44°25′27.6″N 26°2′49.7″E
- Platforms: 1 island platform
- Tracks: 2
- Bus routes: 69, 93, 105, 168, 368.

Construction
- Structure type: underground

History
- Opened: 15 September 2020

Services
Preceding station	Bucharest Metro	Following station
Tudor Vladimirescu towards Râul Doamnei or Valea Ialomiței	Line M5	Orizont towards Eroilor
Location

Favorit is a station on line M5 of Bucharest Metro. It is located between Orizont and Tudor Vladimirescu. The station was opened on 15 September 2020 as part of the inaugural section of M5, from Eroilor to Valea Ialomiței and Râul Doamnei.
