= Izvor metro station =

Bucharest metro station

Coordinates: 44.43296°N 26.08990°E

Izvor
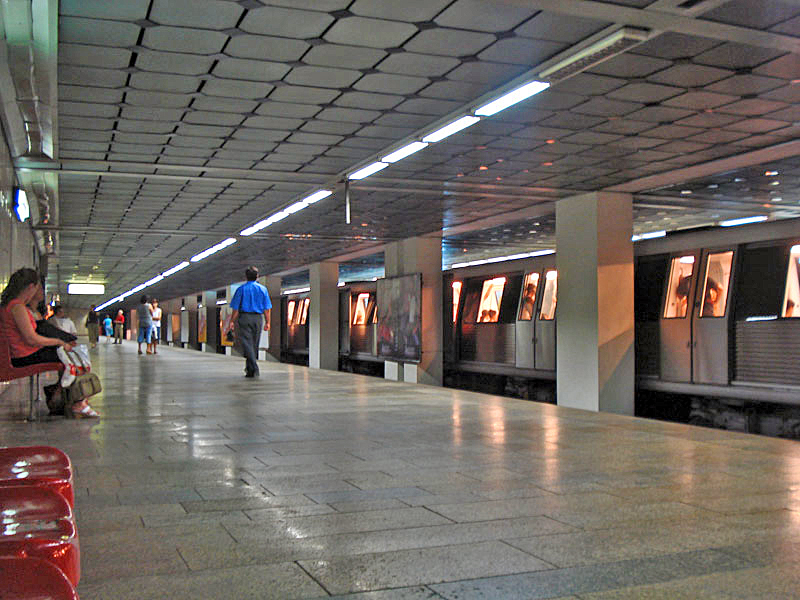
- Metro station in 2007

General information
- Location: Izvor; Sector 5, Bucharest; Romania
- Platforms: 2 side platforms
- Tracks: 2
- Bus routes: 63, 104, 123, 385.

Construction
- Structure type: Underground

History
- Opened: 19 November 1979

Services
Preceding station	Bucharest Metro	Following station
Eroilor towards Dristor 2	Line M1	Piața Unirii towards Republica
Eroilor towards Preciziei	Line M3	Piața Unirii towards Anghel Saligny
Location

Izvor is a metro station in Bucharest, Romania, located near the Palace of the Parliament. It also services one of the buildings of the Bucharest Veterinary University, the Gheorghe Lazăr High School and the Cișmigiu Gardens.

It was opened on 19 November 1979 as part of the first line of the Bucharest metro, between Semanatoarea and Timpuri Noi, on the right bank of the Dâmbovița River, in what was then the Izvor neighbourhood (the entire area on the right bank of the Dâmboviţa river was demolished four years later during Nicolae Ceaușescu's systematization plans in order to make way for the Palace of the Parliament). The station itself is shallow, with two lateral platforms allowing access to the centrally positioned tracks. There is no vestibule – the station is too shallow to allow for a level to be built above the tracks, and the architects of the Bucharest Metro did not fashion building above-ground vestibules such as those found in Moscow or London. As such, the ticketing machines are on the same level with the tracks themselves. As all entrances are on the southbound platform, the architects designed a passage running beneath the tracks to provide access from the southbound platform to the northbound platform. The only other station where this is the case is at Berceni on Line 2.

The station itself uses a dark gray and light beige colour scheme, employing cold white lighting. The station is quite small, being initially built to service a rather low-density residential area.

Myth has it that in the late-1970s when the line was being built, president Ceauşescu ordered that this station be linked to the Palace of the Parliament via an interconnecting train tunnel. If this is true or false remains a mystery.
