= Academia Militară metro station =

Bucharest metro station

Academia Militară
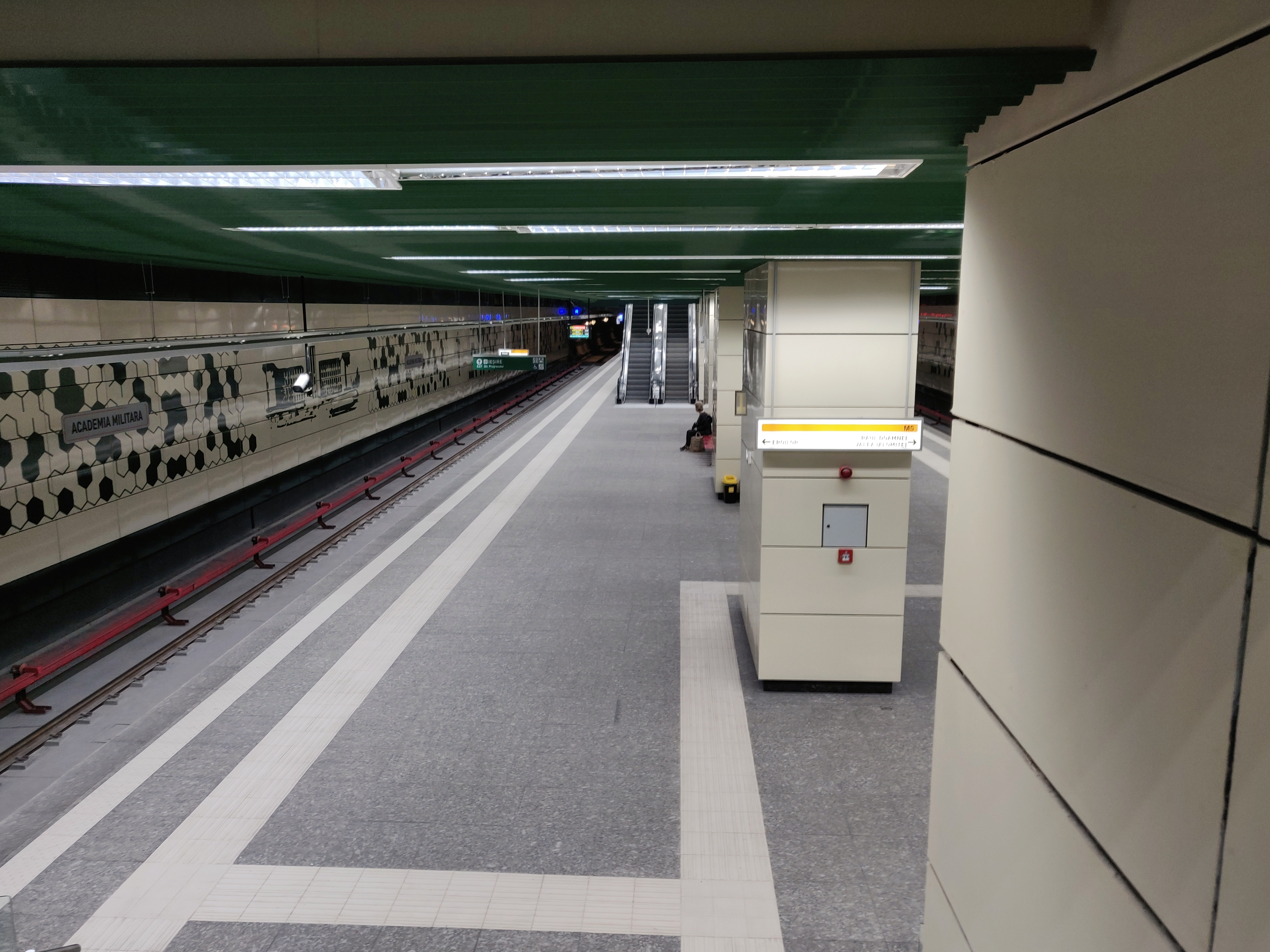
- The station's platform

General information
- Location: Sector 5, Bucharest; Romania
- Coordinates: 44°25′44.1″N 26°3′46.3″E
- Platforms: 1 island platform
- Tracks: 2
- Tram routes: 1, 10, 11, 25.
- Bus routes: 63, 69, 96, 117, 122, 137, 139, 168, 226, 368, 487.

Construction
- Structure type: underground

History
- Opened: 15 September 2020

Services
| Preceding station | Bucharest Metro | Following station |
|---|---|---|
| Orizont towards Râul Doamnei or Valea Ialomiței | Line M5 | Eroilor Terminus |
Location

Academia Militară is a station on line M5 of Bucharest Metro. It is located between Eroilor and Orizont. The station was opened on 15 September 2020 as part of the inaugural section of M5, from Eroilor to Valea Ialomiței and Râul Doamnei. It is named for the nearby Carol I National Defence University.
