= Constantin Brâncuși metro station =

Bucharest Metro station

Constantin Brâncuși

General information
- Location: Sector 6, Bucharest; Romania
- Coordinates: 44°25′12.3″N 26°1′12.6″E
- Platforms: 1 island platform
- Tracks: 2
- Bus routes: 93, 105, 138, 168, 232.

Construction
- Structure type: underground

History
- Opened: 15 September 2020

Services
Preceding station	Bucharest Metro	Following station
Râul Doamnei Terminus	Line M5	Romancierilor towards Eroilor
Location

Constantin Brâncuși is a station on line M5 of Bucharest Metro. Named after the Romanian-French sculptor Constantin Brâncuși, it is located between Romancierilor and Râul Doamnei. The station was opened on 15 September 2020 as part of the inaugural section of M5, from Eroilor to Valea Ialomiței and Râul Doamnei.
