= Parc Drumul Taberei metro station =

Bucharest metro station

Parc Drumul Taberei
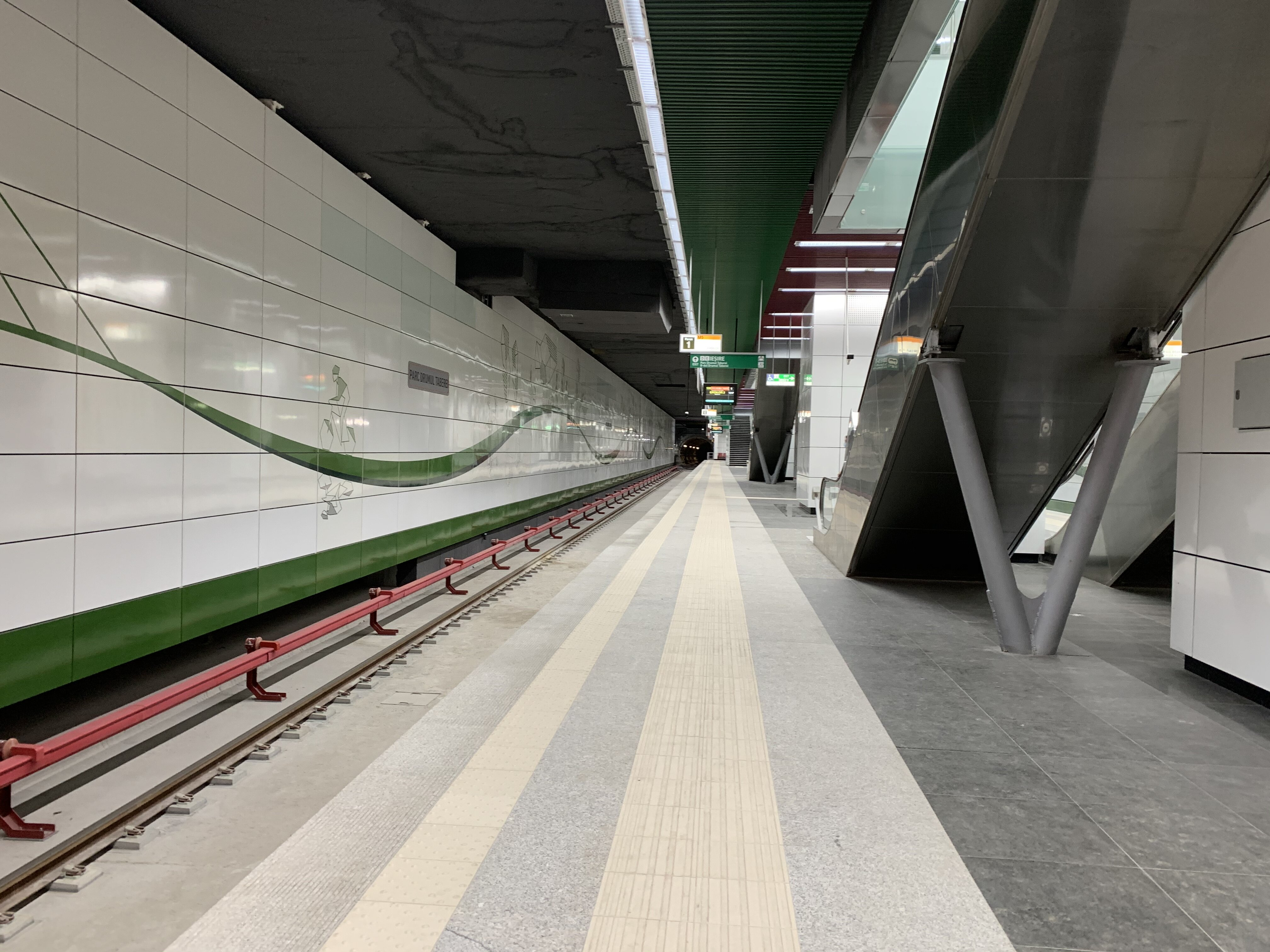
- Platform view of station

General information
- Location: Sector 6, Bucharest; Romania
- Coordinates: 44°25′20.1″N 26°1′59.7″E
- Platforms: 1 island platform
- Tracks: 2
- Tram routes: 41
- Bus routes: 105, 168, 368.

Construction
- Structure type: underground

History
- Opened: 15 September 2020

Services
Preceding station	Bucharest Metro	Following station
Romancierilor towards Râul Doamnei or Valea Ialomiței	Line M5	Tudor Vladimirescu towards Eroilor
Location

Parc Drumul Taberei (Camp Road Parc) is a station on line M5 of Bucharest Metro. It is located between Tudor Vladimirescu and Romancierilor. The station was opened on 15 September 2020 as part of the inaugural section of M5, from Eroilor to Valea Ialomiței and Râul Doamnei. The Drumul Taberei parc and the Steaua Stadium (the station that the Steaua football club uses) can be found nearby.
