= Grozăvești metro station =

Bucharest metro station

Coordinates: 44.44282°N 26.06000°E

Grozăvești
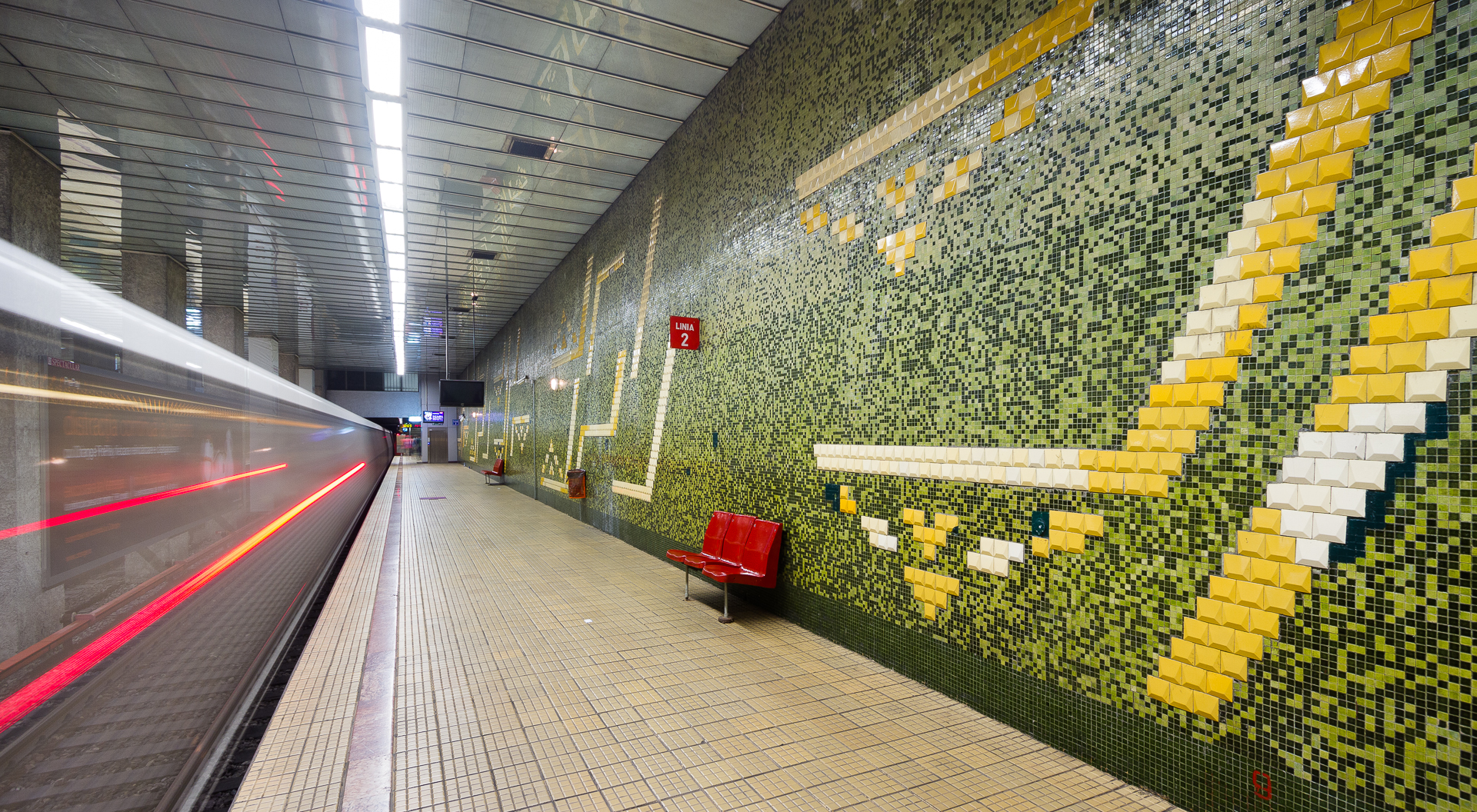

General information
- Location: Pod Grozăvești/Regie; Sector 6, Bucharest; Romania
- Platforms: 2 side platforms
- Tracks: 2
- Tram routes: 1, 10, 11.
- Bus routes: 90, 105.

Construction
- Structure type: Underground

History
- Opened: 19 November 1979

Services
Preceding station	Bucharest Metro	Following station
Petrache Poenaru towards Dristor 2	Line M1	Eroilor towards Republica
Location

Grozăvești is a metro station in Bucharest, Romania, on the Metro Line M1. It is located on the banks of the Dâmbovița River, next to Politehnica University of Bucharest (it is one of the three metro stations servicing the university), the Regie and the Grozăvești student campuses, the Grozăvești Power Station, the Carrefour Orhideea shopping centre, and the Basarab Overpass. It is also used by visitors of the Bucharest Botanical Garden.

Grozăvești was inaugurated on 19 November 1979 as part of the first line of the Bucharest Metro, between Semănătoarea and Timpuri Noi, and is currently servicing the M1 metro line.

The station was built employing a two-platform system, with the tracks in the center, and with exits at each end of the station, leading to a higher underground platform used as a vestibule. The station's theme colour is dark green, with walls covered in light and dark green mosaic pieces arranged at random as to not form any patterns.
