= Ștefan cel Mare metro station =

Bucharest metro station

Ștefan cel Mare
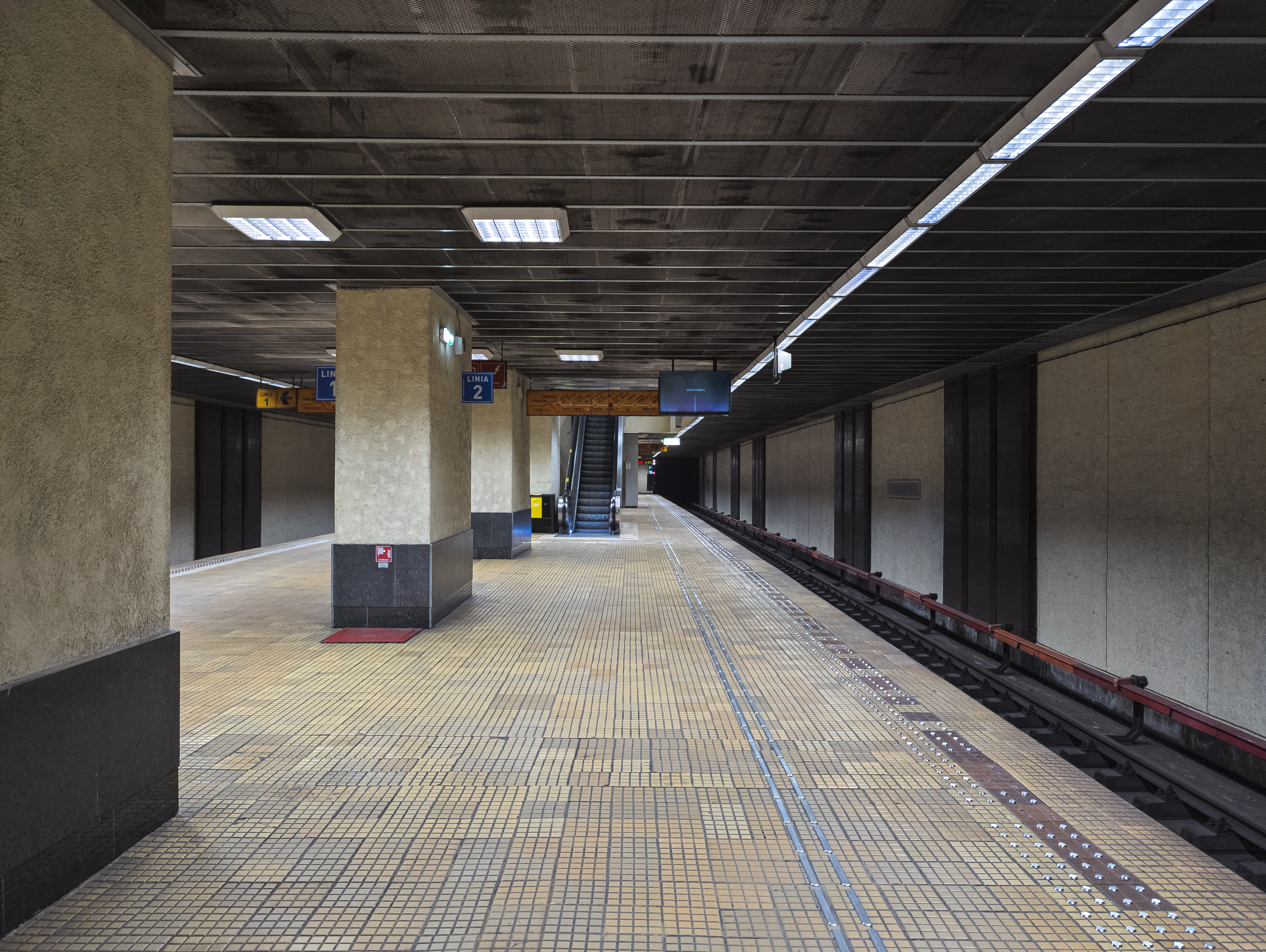

General information
- Location: Bulevardul Ștefan cel Mare; Sector 2, Bucharest; Romania
- Coordinates: 44°27′10″N 26°06′19″E
- Platforms: 1 Island platform
- Tracks: 2
- Tram routes: 1, 5, 10
- Bus routes: 135, 182, 335.

Construction
- Structure type: Underground

History
- Opened: 17 August 1989

Services
Preceding station	Bucharest Metro	Following station
Obor towards Dristor 2	Line M1	Piața Victoriei towards Republica
Location

Ștefan cel Mare is a metro station in Bucharest. Located in west-central Bucharest, it is named after Ștefan cel Mare, a medieval Moldavian prince regarded as a hero in Romania for his long resistance against the Ottoman Empire. It is located near the Dinamo Stadium. The STB connections are 1, 5 and 10 (trams).

== History ==
The station was opened on 17 August 1989 as part of the extension from Gara de Nord to Dristor of line III (now M1 line).

The station has suffered modifications over the years.

In June 2017 the original turnstiles were changed with new, modern ones featuring embedded digital card (magnetic stripe card) reader, smart card RFID reader (for contactless transport cards) and POS terminal for contactless payments (starting 2020). The acquisition was co-financed by the European Union through the Big Infrastructure Operational Program - POIM.

After an incident in 2019 when a passenger was hit by a plane of glass that fell from the ceiling in the Universitate station, the false glass ceilings were removed from most stations. In Ștefan cel Mare station these were replaced by metallic grids.

Tactile paving was mounted towards the end of 2022 for visually impaired people.

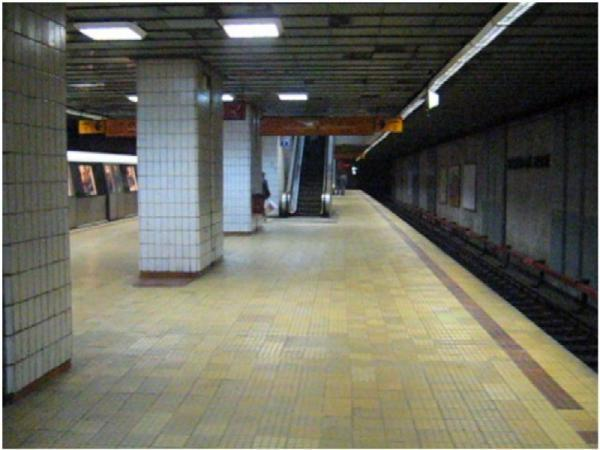
Ștefan cel Mare station in 2005

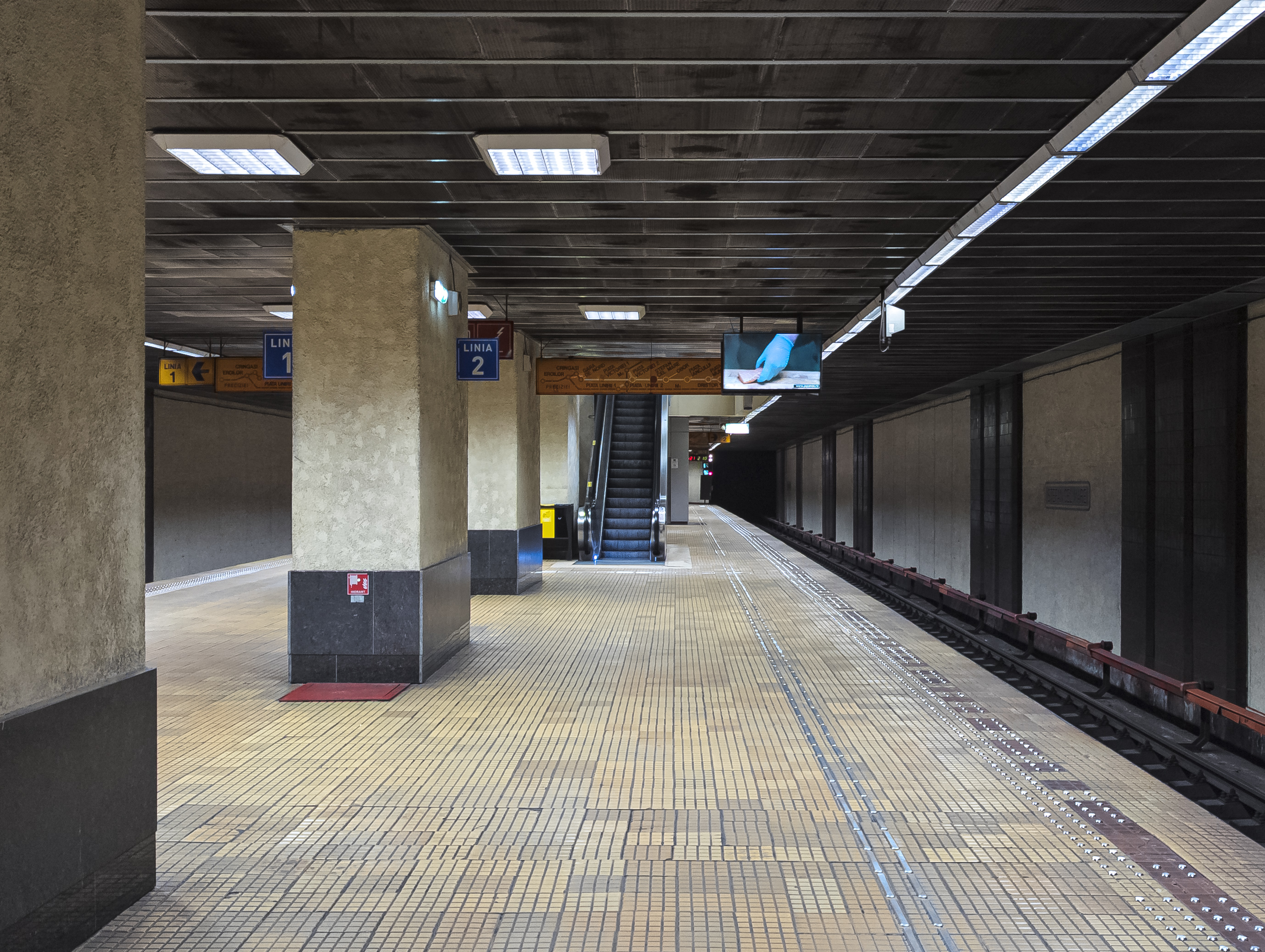
Ștefan cel Mare station in 2023

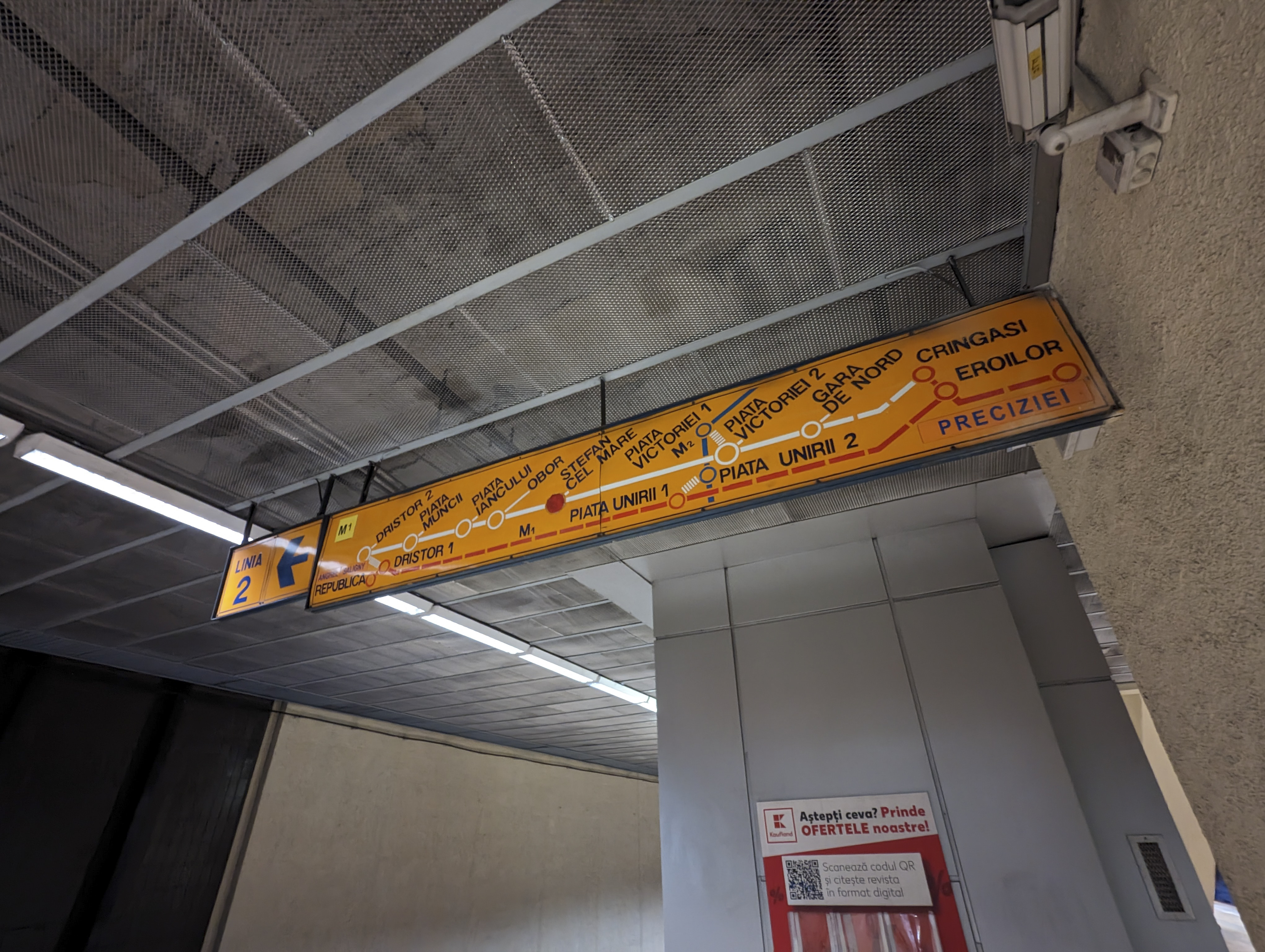
Original information panel of the line route, still in place as of March 2023

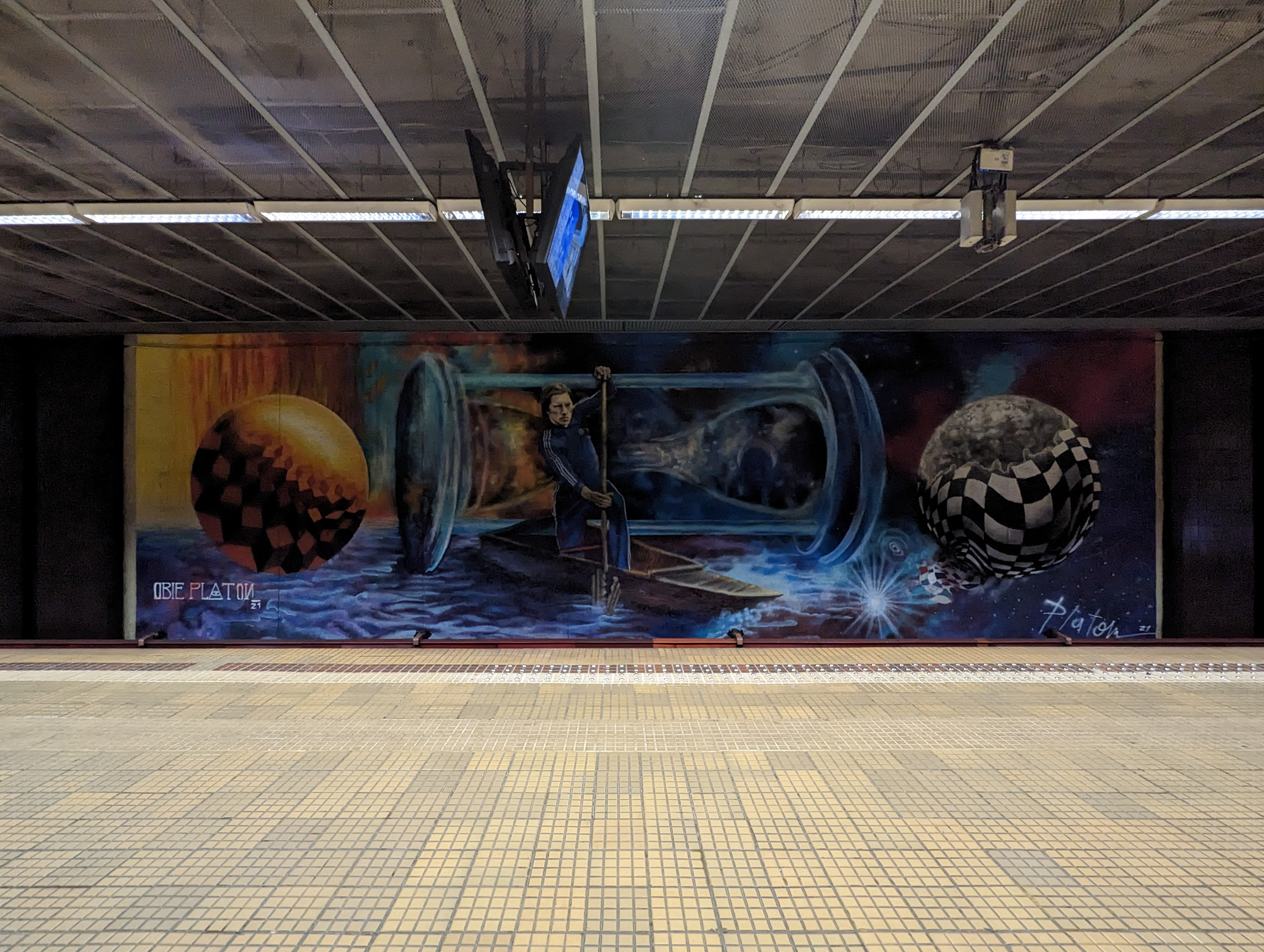
Art on one of the station's walls
