= Basarab metro station =

Bucharest metro station

Coordinates: 44.45073°N 26.06944°E

M1 M4 Basarab
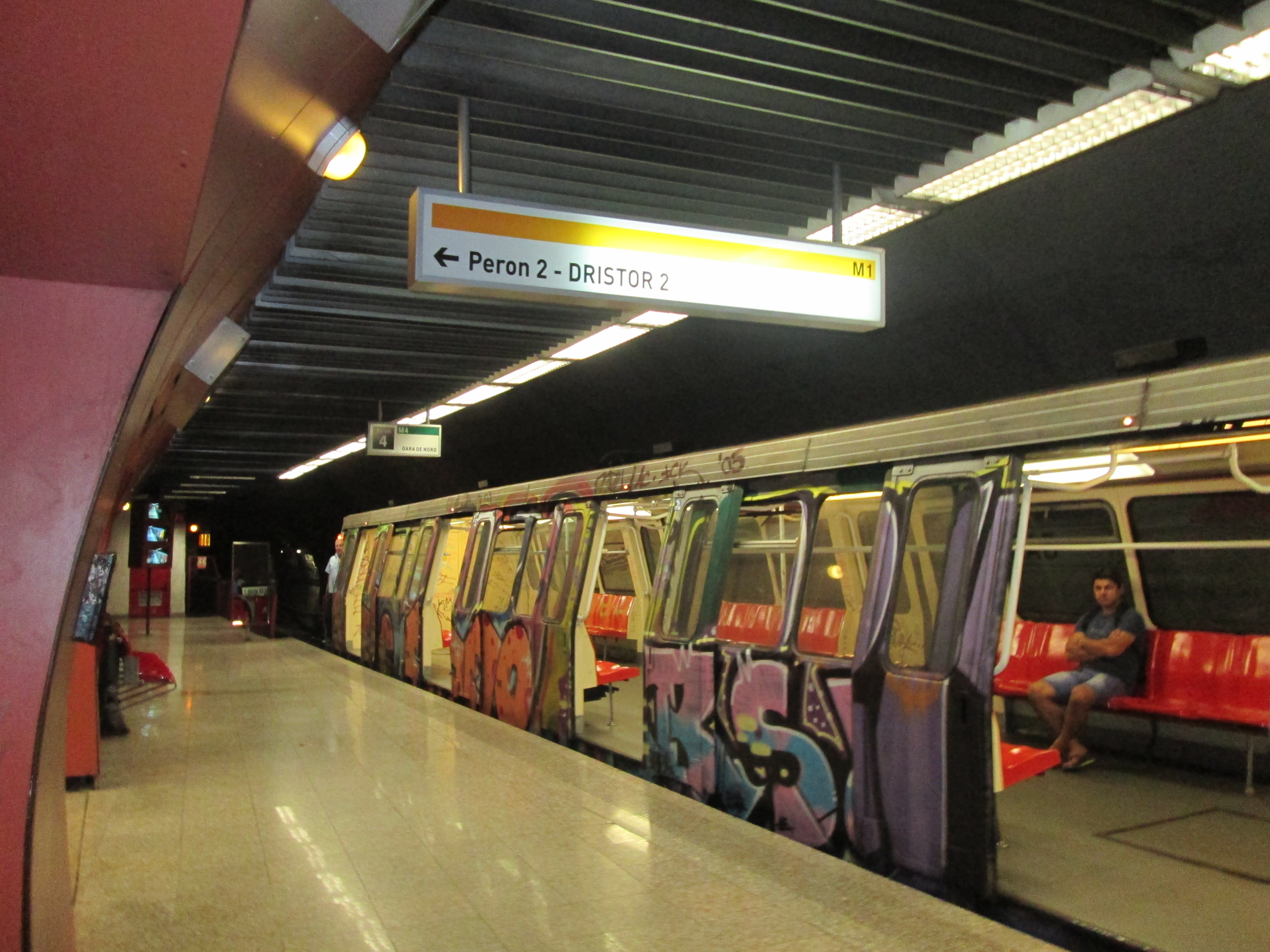
- Track used by the M4 line, 2016

General information
- Location: Basarab Train Station; Sector 1, Bucharest; Romania
- Platforms: 2 island platforms
- Tracks: 4
- Tram routes: 1, 10, 44.
- Bus routes: 86, 93, 97, 104, 105, 123, 162, 178, 182, 282.

Construction
- Structure type: Underground

History
- Opened: 26 August 1992 (M1); 1 March 2000 (M4)

Services
Preceding station	Bucharest Metro	Following station
Crângași towards Republica	Line M1	Gara de Nord towards Dristor 2
Grivița towards Străulești	Line M4	Gara de Nord Terminus
Location

Basarab is a metro station in Bucharest. It is located near the Basarab railway station (Gara Basarab), which is part of Bucharest's main railway station, at the intersection of Calea Griviței and Nicolae Titulescu Avenue.

Access to Gara Basarab proper (a small annex of Gara de Nord, used mainly for commuter trains) is possible via a tunnel crossing the 14 platforms and tracks of Gara de Nord.

The station has four tracks on the same level, two of the tracks on each side of the station, and two as a pair in the center, leaving space for two wide platforms. The two central tracks are used by M1 while the outermost tracks are used by M4, leaving one platform to be used for northbound trains and one for southbound trains. Each platform has very long and thick wall-like columns, spanning for three quarters of the station, allowing access between the M1 and M4 sections through 6 points. This was done to easier conceal the work being done on the M4 side while passengers were using the M1 side. The design of the two sides, although part of the same station and even the same platform, is quite different – the M1 side features white-grey marble walls and floors, with a grey travertine roof arranged as to form a square grid, lit by square white fluorescent neon lights built inside the grid while the M4 side features orange synthetic walls, black Azul Noce granite on the floors, and yellow neon lighting running in a continuous line along the station, above the tracks. The station is usually announced in trains at Gara de Nord, Grivița, and Crângași as "the place to switch between M1 and M4".

== History ==
The M1 station was added on 26 August 1992 to the already operating extension from Crângași to Gara de Nord. The M4 station was opened on 1 March 2000 as part of the inaugural section of the line from Gara de Nord to 1 Mai.

The Basarab metro station was added after Line M1 was finished, with the sole intent of providing a means to change from M1 to M4. Initially, the trains of M1 and M4 were supposed to run on the same trackage up to Crângași but a change of project in 1988 involved building separate trackage for each, with the trains running exclusively under Calea Griviței and no longer reaching Crângași. Another reason for building Basarab metro station was that although the two lines that cross it also co-exist in Gara de Nord metro station, access between the two is impossible without leaving the system and paying for a fare again. The station is extremely close to the Gara de Nord metro station (not only are the lights of Basarab easily visible through the tunnel at Gara de Nord 2, but both stations are built below the platforms of Gara de Nord railway station), a situation uncommon for a system characterized by large distances between stations (up to 2 km (1.2 mi)). The construction of the station began in November 1990 and was completed in January 1992 for the M1 section and March 2000 for the M4 section.

The station has suffered modifications over the years.

In June 2017 the original turnstiles were changed with new, modern ones featuring embedded digital card (magnetic stripe card) reader, smart card RFID reader (for contactless transport cards) and POS terminal for contactless payments (starting 2020). The acquisition was co-financed by the European Union through the Big Infrastructure Operational Program - POIM.

Tactile paving was mounted towards the end of 2022 for visually impaired people.
