= Obor metro station =

Bucharest metro station

Obor
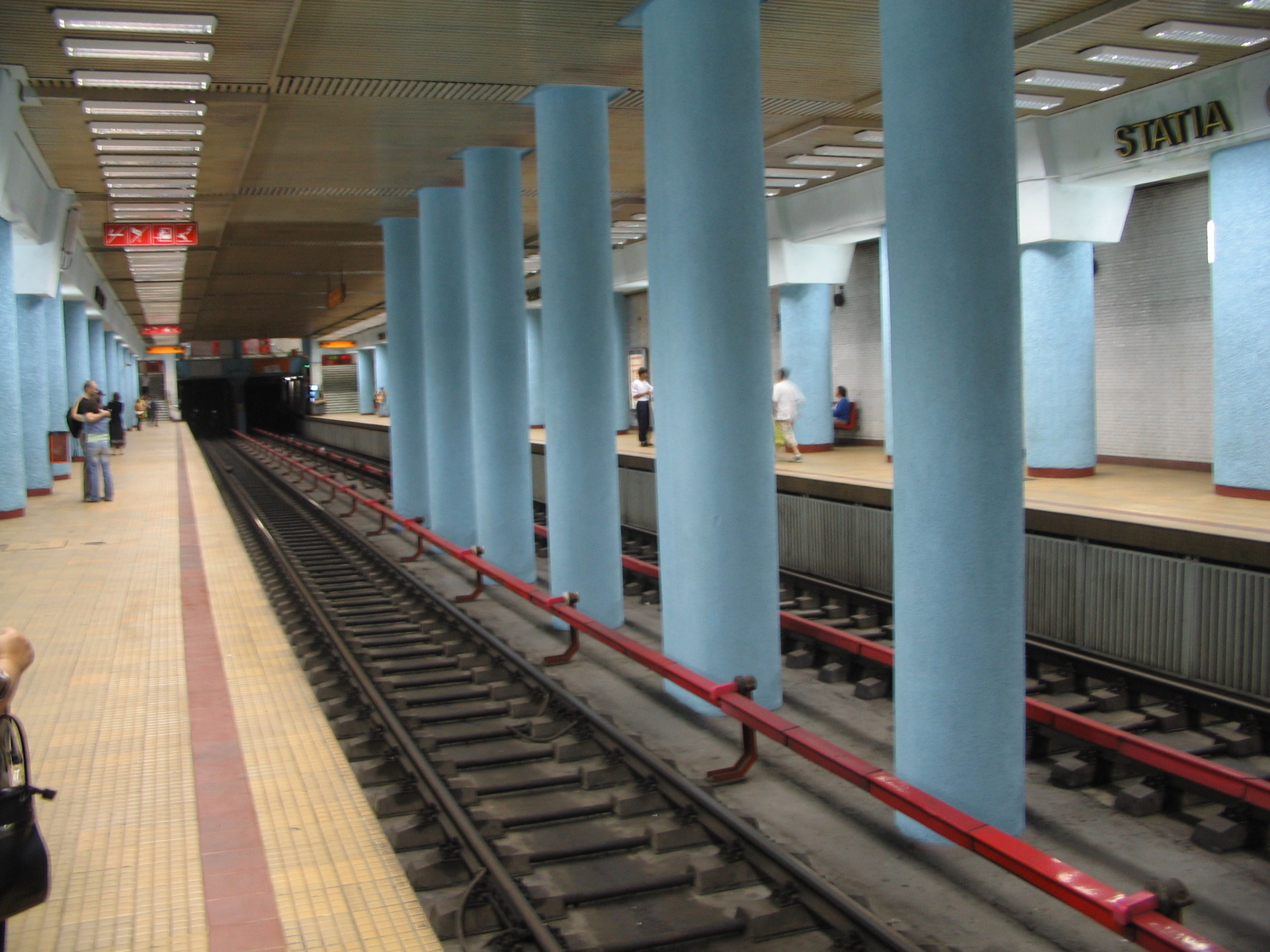
- Blue pillars separating the two track

General information
- Location: Rond Obor; Sector 2, Bucharest; Romania
- Coordinates: 44°27′00″N 26°07′27″E
- Platforms: 2 Side platforms
- Tracks: 2
- Tram routes: 1, 5, 10, 21.
- Bus routes: 66, 101, 143, 335.

Construction
- Structure type: Underground

History
- Opened: 24 June 1979 (tram station); 17 August 1989 (metro station)

Services
Preceding station	Bucharest Metro	Following station
Piața Iancului towards Dristor 2	Line M1	Ştefan cel Mare towards Republica
Location

Obor is a metro station in Bucharest, Romania, near one of the city's largest open-air markets, also named Obor. The station, part of the M1 line, originally opened on August 17, 1989, as part of the metro extension from Gara de Nord to Dristor.

The station underwent significant refurbishment and was closed for over 10 months, reopening on May 25, 2008. This renovation was part of a broader project to facilitate the construction of a new overground passage for trams. The station's interior features a blue color scheme, with pillars separating the two sides of the platform. It is currently serving by the M1 line.

The Obor metro station is well-connected to the city's surface transportation network, providing connections to several STB services, including tram lines 1, 10 and 21, as well as bus routes 330 and 335. The station's strategic location and connectivity make it a vital hub for both metro and surface transportation in Bucharest.

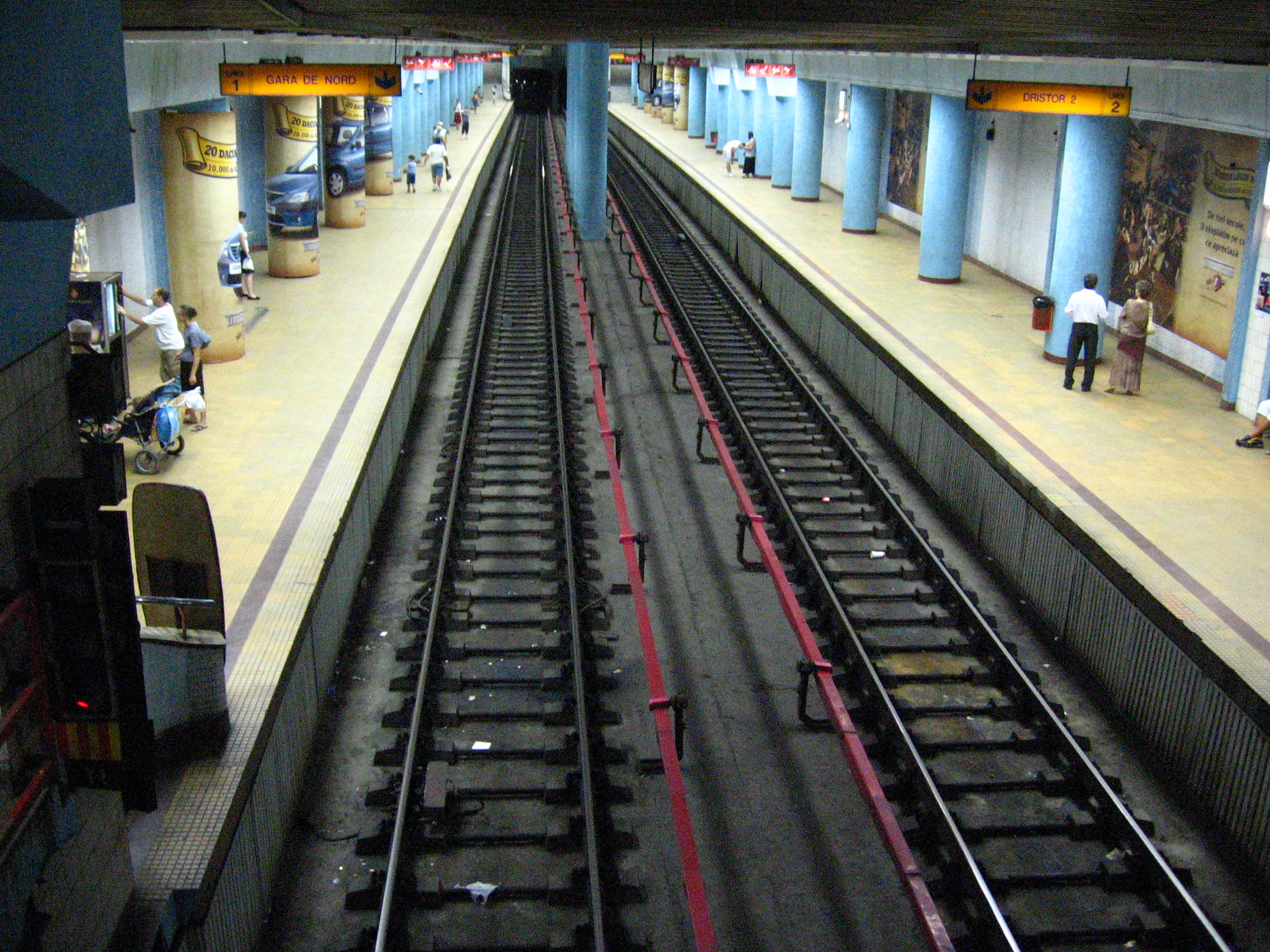
Inside the Obor metro station
