= Regie, Bucharest =

Neighborhood in Bucharest, Romania

Coordinates: 44.445983°N 26.052253°E

Regie on the map of Bucharest

Regie is a small district situated in western Bucharest, the capital of Romania, on the banks of the Dâmbovița River, in Sector 6. It is located in the vicinity of the Politehnica University of Bucharest and comprises mainly student dormitories and student facilities like restaurants, bars, and clubs. It is delimited by the Crângași and Militari districts.

== History ==
Interest in the area began in 1848 when the "Moara de apă Ciurel" water mill was built in the neighborhood. On the site of the water mill, the "Spicul" bread factory was built in 1948. In 2008, the factory was demolished and the construction of a residential complex began. In 1864, the "Manufactura de Tutun de la Belvedere" tobacco factory was built in the area. The factory was owned by Effingham Grant, a secretary for the British Consulate in Bucharest. Grant also built a mansion and established "Regia Monopolurilor Statului" in the area, hence the name "Regie" for the neighborhood. Construction of the student dormitories started in 1961.

== Transportation ==
The district is served by the Grozăvești and Petrache Poenaru metro stations. The east side of the neighborhood is traversed quickly using the newly built Basarab Overpass, but only by car or tram because the overpass does not have any sidewalks. The RATB student bus line 601 serves the area near the Splaiul Independenței street.

== Living ==
The area is mostly inhabited by students so it has many restaurants, fast-food joints, pubs and clubs. Night life is very active and many people go there for entertainment. There are also many clubs dedicated to sport activities like billiards, table tennis or bowling. The Regie stadium, the home ground of the football club Sportul Studențesc, is situated in the area. There are also some tennis courts and a rugby stadium nearby. Shopping in the area can be done either at the nearby Carrefour Orhideea, the IDM Basarab Commercial Center, or at one of the many kiosks near the student dormitories.
