= Crângași metro station =

Bucharest metro station

Coordinates: 44°27′07.57″N 26°02′49.5″E

Crângași
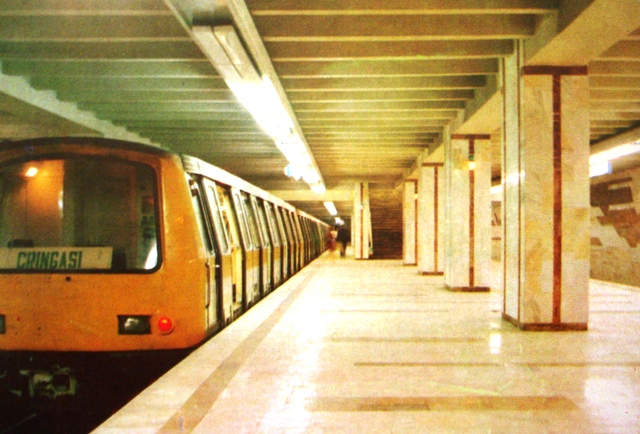
- The station between 1984 and 1987, with a yellow IVA train

General information
- Location: Crângași Market; Sector 6, Bucharest; Romania
- Platforms: 2 – One open island platform, one unused side platform
- Tracks: 3
- Tram routes: 41
- Bus routes: 90, 162, 163, 178.

Construction
- Structure type: Underground

History
- Opened: 22 December 1984

Services
Preceding station	Bucharest Metro	Following station
Basarab towards Dristor 2	Line M1	Petrache Poenaru towards Republica
Location

Crângași is a metro station in the Crângași neighborhood, northwestern Bucharest.

It was opened to the public on 22 December 1984 as a terminus of the M1 line, one-line extension from Semănătoarea. On 24 December 1987, the line was extended further to Gara de Nord.

The station is unusual in that it has three tracks on the same level, one of which has never been used by passengers (it is sometimes used for temporary storage of trains). The explanation is that Crîngași was initially designed to also house the "Y point" for the M1 and a southern semi-circular line (where southbound trains use a similar platform, and northbound trains use different platforms), in a manner similar to the way Eroilor functioned from 1979 to 1999 and from 2009 to present day – Line 1 and 2 used for trains entering the common section from different routes while line 3 for trains exiting the different routes). However, by 1986, when construction began on the section between Crîngași and Gara de Nord, the plans were changed (a common feature for Bucharest's metro), with M4 (the line designation for the abandoned semi-circular southern line) being re-purposed as a Gara de Nord to Bucureștii-Noi line. However, aside from the third platform, there are also noticeable stub-tunnels which would have led towards the next station on the abandoned line.

Nowadays, the station is a point of transfer to the light rail line 41 (reconstructed in 2002), which runs from Ghencea to Piața Presei Libere. The Light Rail station is completely above the surface, and plans to bring the line underground are uncertain, as of now. There are, however, transfer tunnels linking directly to line 41.

The station was built using cut-and-cover techniques at a rather shallow depth, in grey-blue Rușchița marble with red and crimson granite and marble insertions, and features a wide central platform with an additional side platform, mirroring the design used at Eroilor station. As the unused platform is very dimly lit, the station itself is one of the darkest on the system.
