= Romancierilor metro station =

Bucharest metro station

Romancierilor
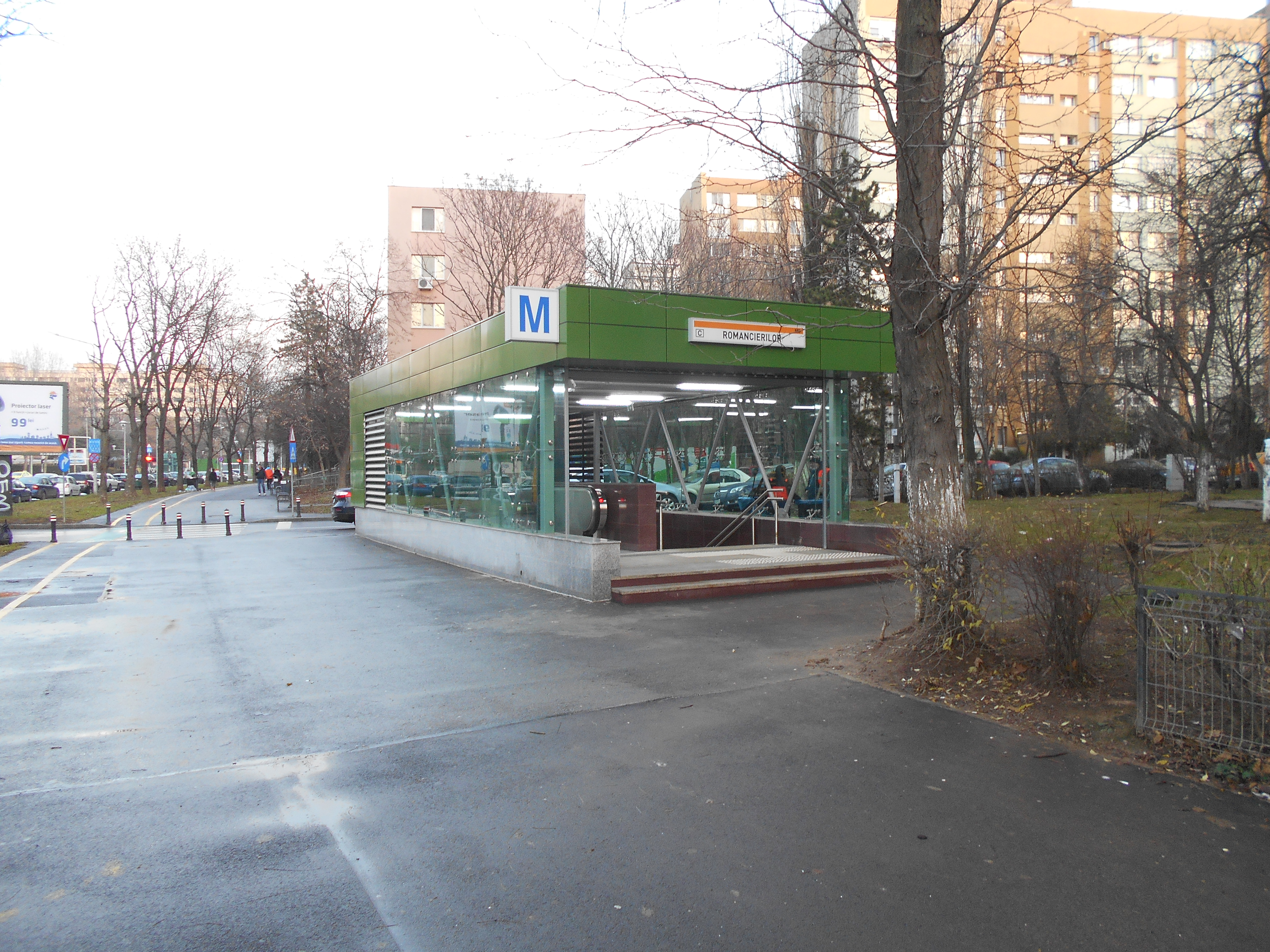

General information
- Location: Sector 6, Bucharest; Romania
- Coordinates: 44°25′23.2″N 26°1′28.9″E
- Platforms: 1 island platform
- Tracks: 2
- Bus routes: 105, 138, 168.

Construction
- Structure type: underground

History
- Opened: 15 September 2020

Services
Preceding station	Bucharest Metro	Following station
Valea Ialomiței Terminus	Line M5	Parc Drumul Taberei towards Eroilor
Constantin Brâncuși towards Râul Doamnei	Line M5	Parc Drumul Taberei towards Eroilor
Location

Romancierilor is a station on line M5 of Bucharest Metro. The adjacent stations are Parc Drumul Taberei (towards Eroilor), Valea Ialomiței, and Constantin Brâncuși (towards Râul Doamnei). The station was opened on 15 September 2020 as part of the inaugural section of M5, from Eroilor to Valea Ialomiței and Râul Doamnei.
