= Piața Iancului metro station =

Bucharest metro station

Piața Iancului
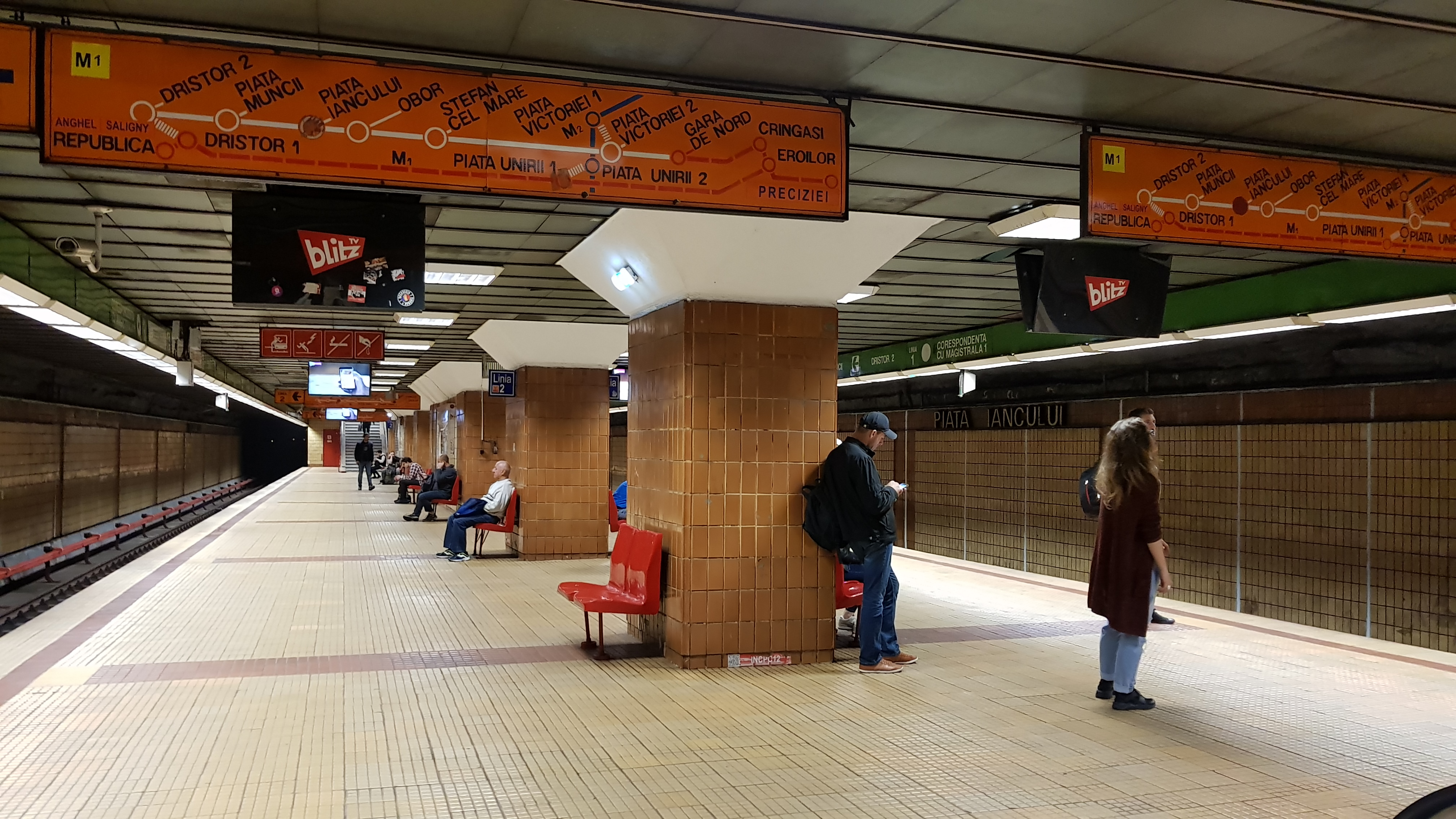
- At the platform

General information
- Location: Piața Iancului; Sector 2, Bucharest; Romania
- Coordinates: 44°26′27″N 26°07′58″E
- Platforms: 1 island platform
- Tracks: 2
- Tram routes: 1, 5, 10, 55.
- Bus routes: 135, 311, 335.

Construction
- Structure type: Underground

History
- Opened: 17 August 1989

Services
Preceding station	Bucharest Metro	Following station
Piața Muncii towards Dristor 2	Line M1	Obor towards Republica
Location

Piața Iancului is a metro station in Bucharest. It is located in the Iancului district near the Iulia Hasdeu National College, on the Pache Popescu/Șoseaua Iancului – Șoseaua Mihai Bravu junction. Lines served by STB are 1, 10 and 55 (trams), 135, 311, 330 and 335 (buses). The N102 also comes here at night.

The station was opened on 17 August 1989 as part of the extension from Gara de Nord to Dristor.
