= Petrache Poenaru metro station =

Bucharest metro station

Coordinates: 44.44532°N 26.0466°E

Petrache Poenaru
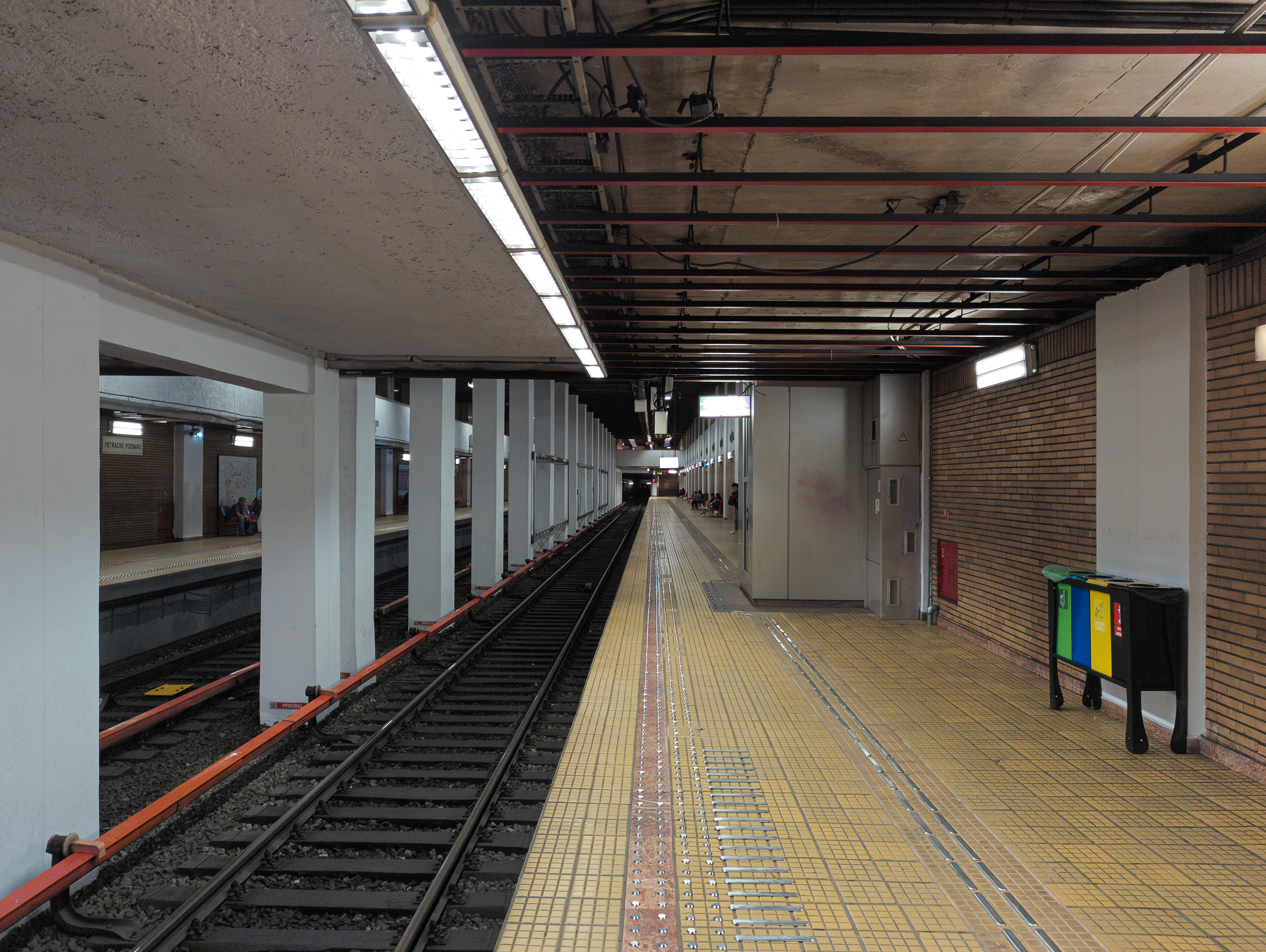

General information
- Location: Pod Semănătoarea/Regie; Sector 6, Bucharest; Romania
- Platforms: 2 side platforms
- Tracks: 2
- Bus routes: 90

Construction
- Structure type: Underground

History
- Opened: 19 November 1979

Services
Preceding station	Bucharest Metro	Following station
Crângaşi towards Dristor 2	Line M1	Grozăveşti towards Republica
Location

Petrache Poenaru, formerly known as Semănătoarea is a metro station in Bucharest, Romania, servicing the Bucharest Metro Line M1. It was named after Semănătoarea, an agricultural machinery factory located in the vicinity, but it is now named after Petrache Poenaru, a Romanian inventor of the Enlightenment era. The metro station services both what is left of the factory (that was severely downsized a number of times), part of the Regie student campus, the Sema Park industrial park, and some newly built residential areas. It is also located close to the Semănătoarea (Ciurel) Metro Depot.

It was one of the least used stations in the city at some point, but recently, industrial and residential projects in the area have increased the station's usage.

== History ==
The station was designed with relatively little traffic in mind, with a central-track design with two narrow platforms on each side of the tracks.

The station opened on 19 November 1979 as part of the first section of the Bucharest Metro, from Semănătoarea to Timpuri Noi and such, it served as a temporary terminus of the first subway line of Bucharest. On 22 December 1984 the line was extended further to Crângași.

The station has suffered modifications over the years.

Lifts were added at some point between 2010 and 2020 to facilitate access for people with mobility deficiencies.

In June 2017 the original turnstiles were changed with new, modern ones featuring embedded digital card (magnetic stripe card) reader, smart card RFID reader for contactless transport cards and POS terminal for contactless payments (starting 2020). The acquisition was co-financed by the European Union through the Big Infrastructure Operational Program - POIM.

After an incident in 2019 when a passenger was hit by a plane of glass that fell from the ceiling in the Universitate station, the false glass ceilings were removed from most stations without any replacement. This measure also took effect in Petrache Poenaru station.

Towards the end of 2022 tactile paving was mounted for visually impaired people.

== Architecture ==
The walls of the Petrache Poenaru metro station are made of yellow and beige tiles with the floor being built in uniform yellow mosaic pieces. The station entrance is unusual in that it faces the street at an angle of 90 degrees and is just a few metres from the road.

The lack of integration of the new lifts and the removal of the glass ceiling in 2019, an iconic element of the Bucharest metro, had a visible negative impact on the architecture. Furthermore, exposed antennas and wires hanging from the ceiling contribute to a degraded aspect of the station.

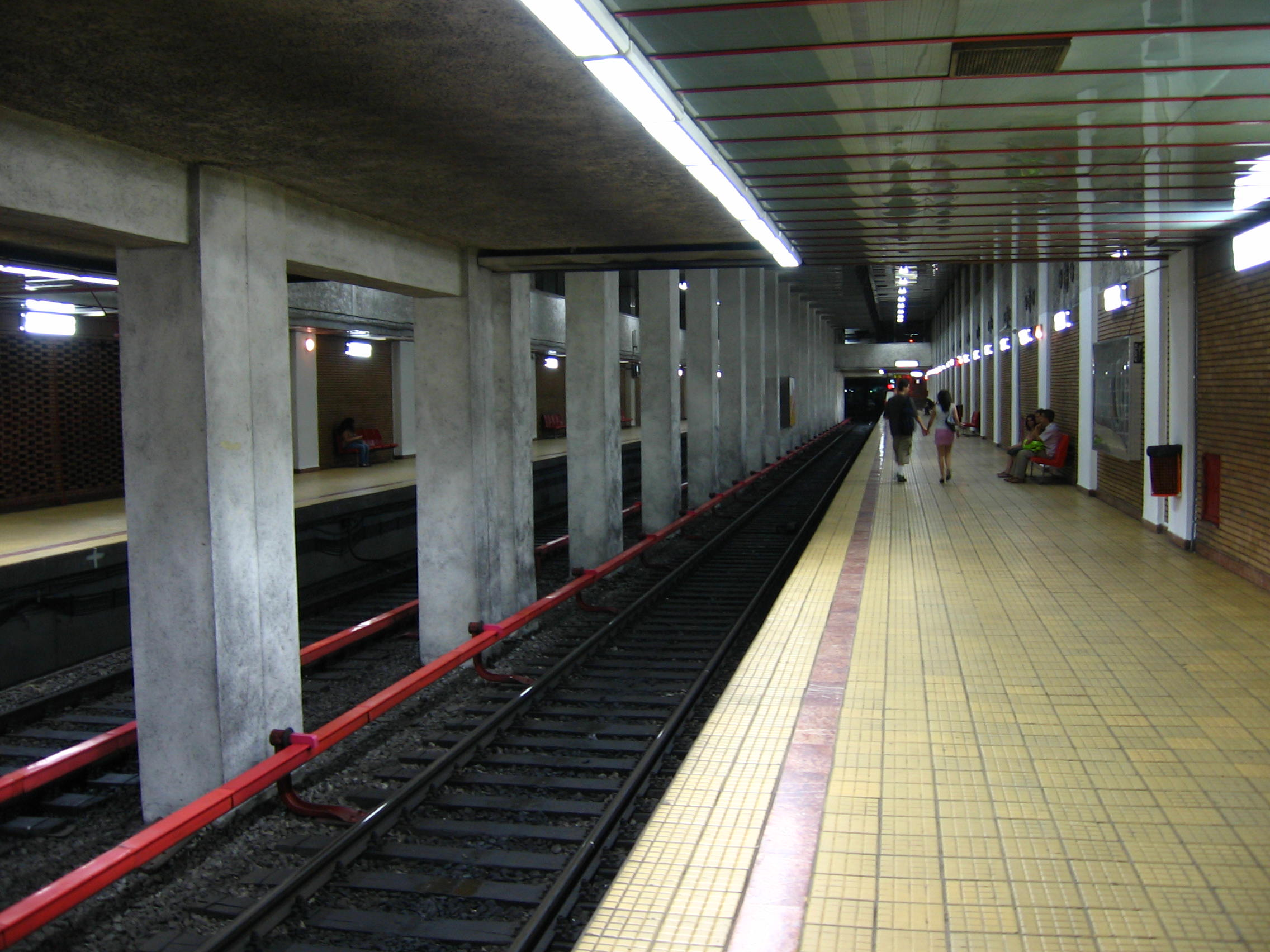
Petrache Poenaru station in 2007

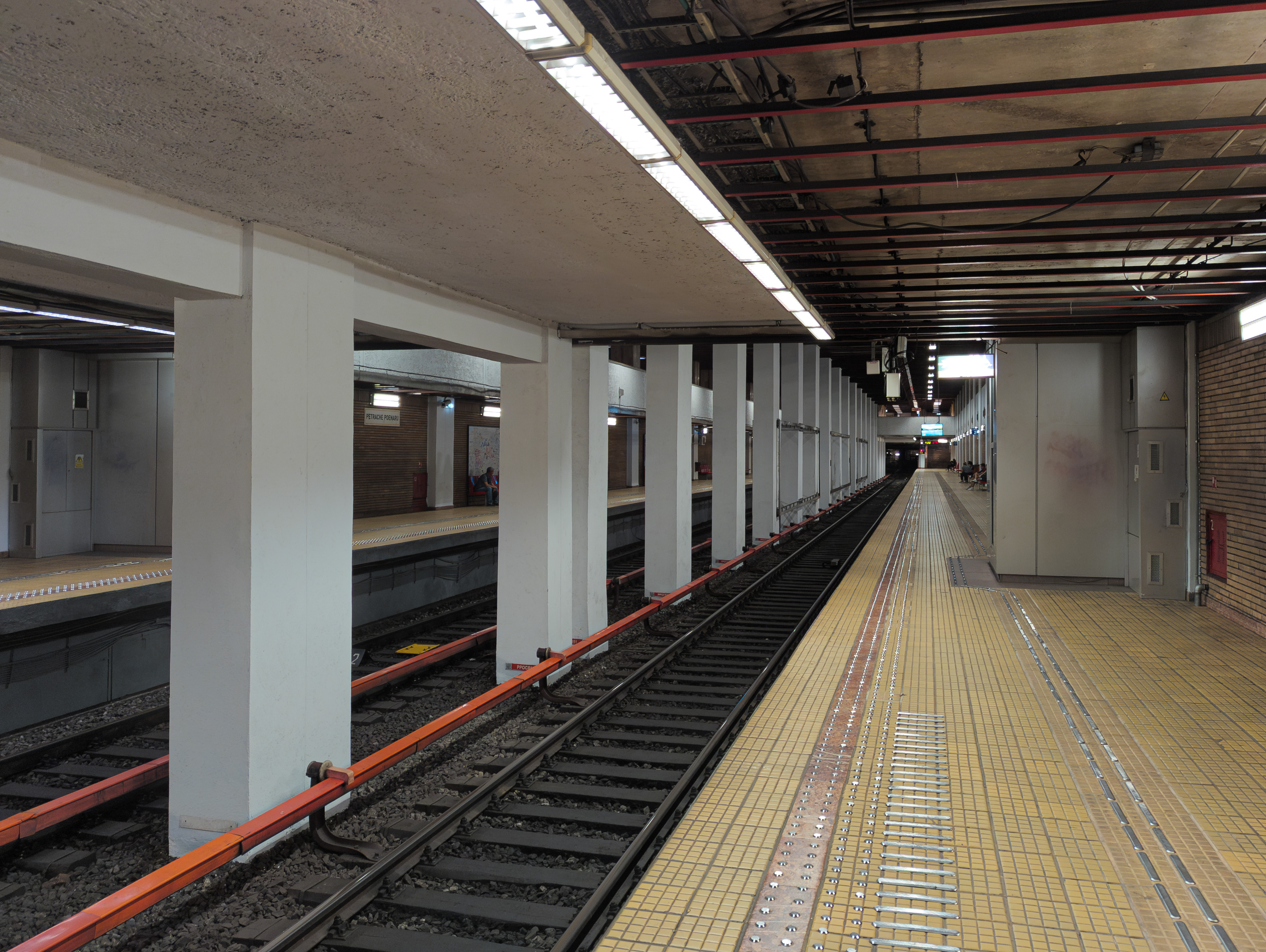
Petrache Poenaru station in 2023
