= Eroilor metro station =

Bucharest metro station

Coordinates: 44.43548°N 26.07471°E

M1 M3 M5 Eroilor
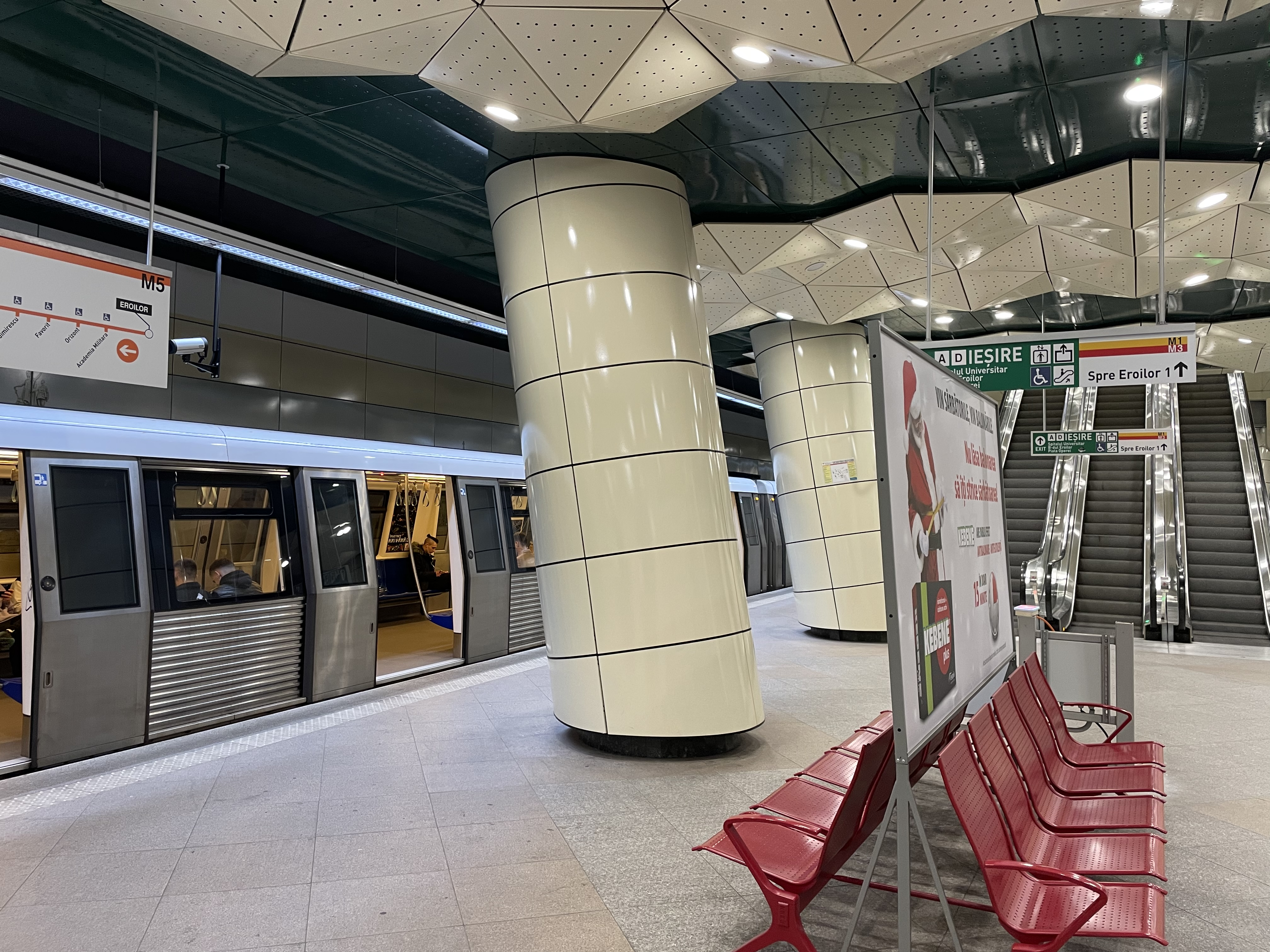
- Eroilor metro station in 2022

General information
- Location: Eroilor Boulevard; Sector 5, Bucharest; Romania
- Platforms: 3 – Two island, one side platform on different levels.
- Tracks: 5
- Bus routes: 61, 69, 70, 90, 96, 104, 117, 122, 123, 137, 163, 168, 226, 368.

Construction
- Structure type: Underground

History
- Opened: 19 November 1979 (M1/3); 15 September 2020 (M5)

Services
Preceding station	Bucharest Metro	Following station
Eroilor 1 (upper level)
Grozăvești towards Dristor 2	Line M1	Izvor towards Republica
Politehnica towards Preciziei	Line M3	Izvor towards Anghel Saligny
Eroilor 2 (lower level)
Academia Militară towards Râul Doamnei or Valea Ialomiței	Line M5	Terminus
Location

Eroilor is a metro station in Bucharest. It is located near the Cotroceni neighbourhood, servicing the Bucharest Metro lines M1, M3, and M5.

Notable buildings in its vicinity are the Bucharest Opera house, the Bucharest Opera Business Center, the Faculty of Law of the University of Bucharest, the Carol Davila University of Medicine and Pharmacy, the University Emergency Hospital Bucharest, one of the buildings of the University of Agronomic Sciences and Veterinary Medicine of Bucharest, and the New St. Eleftherios Church.

== History ==
The station was opened on 19 November 1979 as part of the inaugural section of Bucharest Metro, between Semănătoarea and Timpuri Noi. On 19 August 1983, the extension to Industriilor was opened. On 15 September 2020, the inaugural section of M5, from Eroilor to Valea Ialomiței and Râul Doamnei started operation.

As part of the M5 Line (Drumul Taberei – Universitate – Pantelimon), a new terminal, Eroilor 2, was constructed underneath the existing platforms. It was opened on 15 September 2020.

== Details ==
Eroilor is the last station where lines M1 and M3 run together, each diverging towards different directions (in the westbound direction). It is thus also where M1 and M3 meet in their eastbound directions. The station itself has three tracks – a central platform with two lateral tracks (track 1 and 3) and a lateral platform serving track 2. Trains coming from Grozăvești (M1) use track 3, trains coming from Politehnica (M3) use track 1, while trains coming from Izvor use track 2, no matter the direction they are going to follow requiring the use of an audio signal for identification of the line the train will follow. Behind the station walls, two other tracks exist (designated as tracks 4 and 5), that are used to store reserve trains, that are kept ready-to-run in case of another train malfunctioning or an unexpected increase in passenger loads. Track 4 however, is being currently converted to a passenger track (the wall separating it from track 2 will be demolished).

Until the completion of the Nicolae Grigorescu – Anghel Saligny line, the station was the terminus for line M3, that had been shortened to Preciziei – Eroilor. Regular operation for M3 restarted on 6 July 2009, when M3 became Preciziei- Eroilor – Nicolae Grigorescu – Anghel Saligny.

=== Colour scheme ===
The station was designed using a wide and open floorplan, with a dominant color scheme of white (obtained by using white marble columns) and pale yellow (from the floor tiles). These were initially intended to be complemented by a tone of red and orange through the use of red brick wall lining, of red and orange lighted signage and of incandescent light bulbs for some lateral illumination (it was the only station to use any incandescent light bulbs, all others were designed to use solely fluorescent lamps). However, as both the incandescent lamps and the orange signage were replaced with the more conventional fluorescent white tubes, these red tones disappeared.
