= Pantelimon metro station =

Bucharest metro station

Coordinates: 44°26′27″N 26°11′31″E

M1 Pantelimon
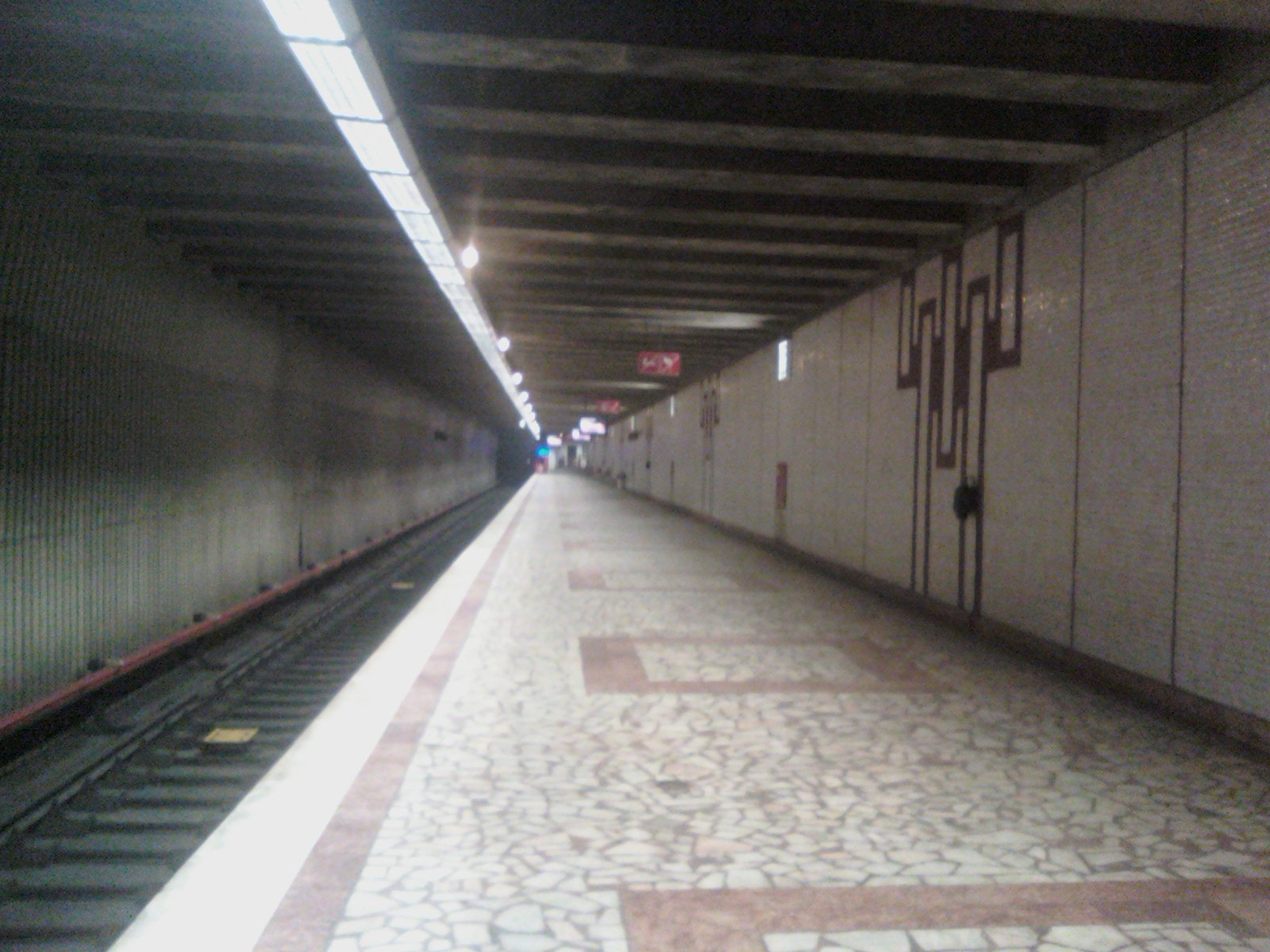
- Pantelimon station in its current form. Notice the corrugated sheets wall that hides the unused second platform.

General information
- Location: Antilopa Factory, Pantelimon District; Sector 3, Bucharest; Romania
- Platforms: One single platform
- Tracks: 1
- Bus routes: 102, 103, 104, 246, 407, 451, 452, 454, 458.

Construction
- Structure type: Railway

History
- Opened: May 1991

Services
Preceding station	Bucharest Metro	Following station
Republica Terminus	Line M1	Terminus
Location

Pantelimon (also known informally as Antilopa) is a metro station on Line M1 of the Bucharest Metro. Situated in Pantelimon neighbourhood, adjacent to the town of Pantelimon, it is the terminus of Line M1 and was opened in May 1991 as a one-station extension from Republica.

The station was built only to serve the Pantelimon Subway Depot and the workers of the defunct Antilopa factory, which is located in the close vicinity. The station only employs one track and most trains on line M1 stop at Republica metro station, while only some go all the way to Pantelimon, when the line is clear.

Supposedly the station was opened in 1989 for trials, and it has another platform (currently unused) but due to residents' complaints about the tunnel underneath cracking their homes, the line was closed but reopened the year later, to be used on a reduced capacity. During the trials, it was stated that at first, a simple shuttle used in the early mornings and late nights was used to transport the workers from the depot, only later the full line being opened for trials (for only a few days, though).
