= Bucharest Metro Line M5 =

Metro line in Bucharest, Romania

Line M5

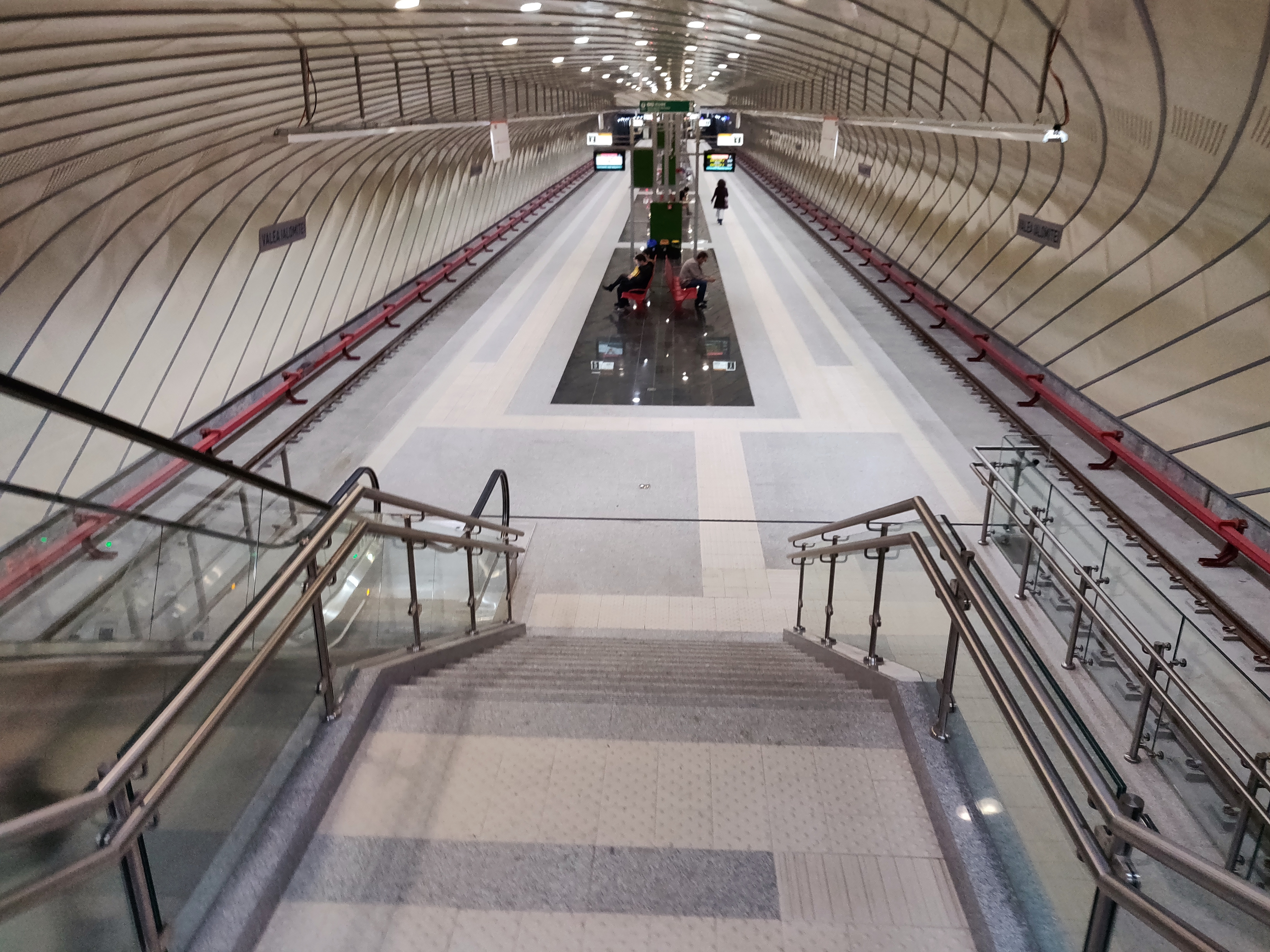
- M5 Valea Ialomiței metro station

Overview
- Status: Operational
- Termini: Râul Doamnei or Valea Ialomiței; Eroilor
- Stations: 10

Service
- Type: Rapid transit
- System: Bucharest Metro
- Depot(s): Valea Ialomiței
- Rolling stock: Bombardier Movia 346, Alstom Metropolis

History
- Opened: 15 September 2020; 5 years ago

Technical
- Track gauge: 1,432 mm (4 ft 8 3/8 in)
- Electrification: 750 V DC third rail

M5 is the newest of the five lines of the Bucharest Metro, opened on 15 September 2020. In the first phase (6.87 km (4.3 mi)), it runs from Eroilor to Râul Doamnei, and to Valea Ialomiței, in the Drumul Taberei neighbourhood.

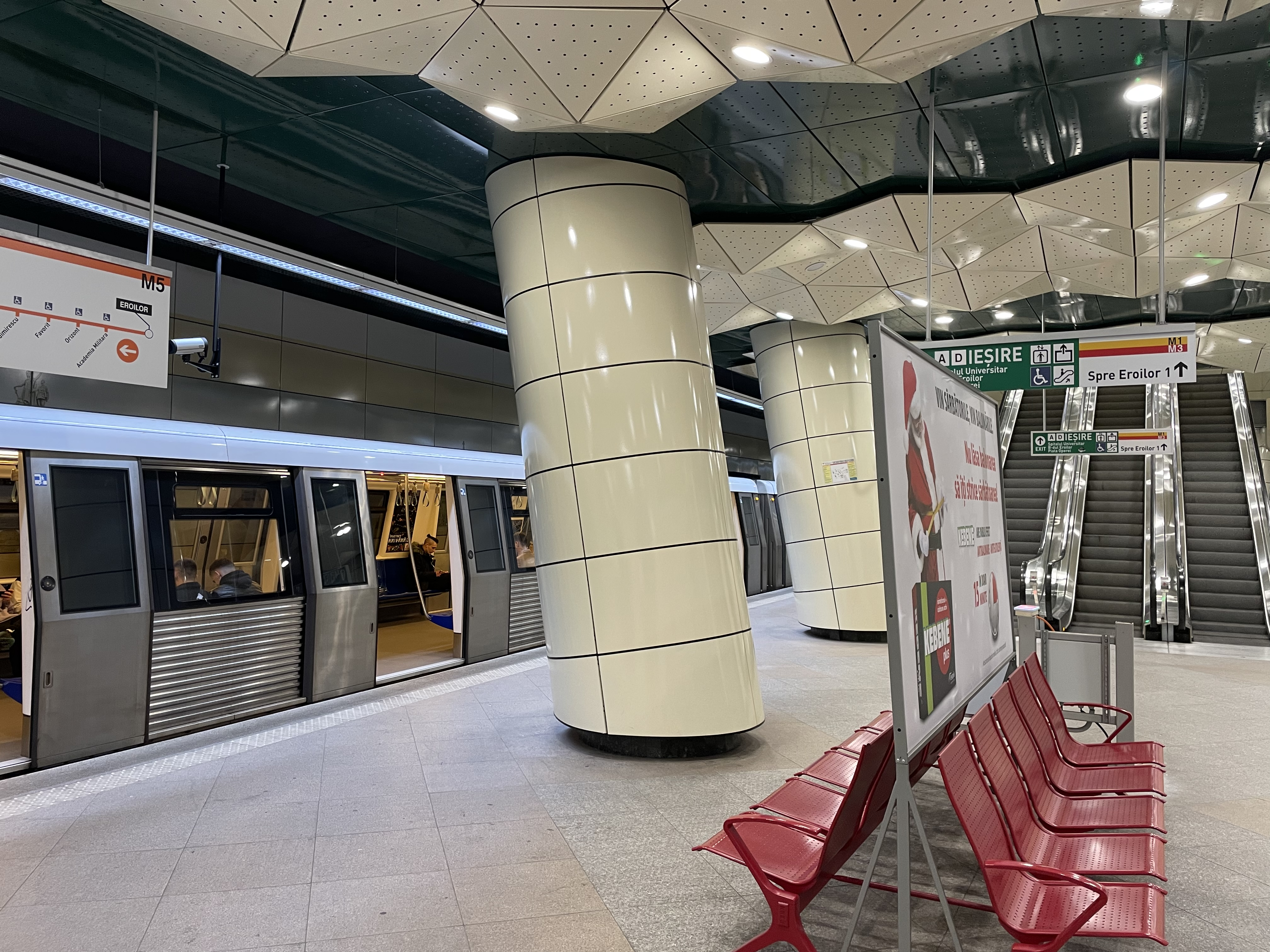
Valea Ialomitei bound Metro train stationed at Eroilor

== History ==
In 2011, construction started on the first section of the M5. The expected construction cost was €708.6 million. Opened on 15 September 2020, the first section, Râul Doamnei to Eroilor is around 7 km (4.3 mi) long with 10 stations.

After that, the line will be extended to Iancului, and from there under Iancului Road (Șoseaua Iancului) until it reaches the Pantelimon station of M1.

== Rolling stock ==
8 Canadian Bombardier Movia 346 train sets borrowed from M3 line are running as of now (August 2025). These trains will be sent back once the new Alstom Metropolis BM4 trains for this line exit testing.

== Stations ==
Network Map

Phase	Terminals	Length	Stations	Constructor	Construction since	Opening
I	Râul Doamnei – Eroilor	6.9 km	9	Astaldi-FCC-AB Construct-Delta ACM	April 2011	15 September 2020
I	Romancierilor – Valea Ialomiței	6.9 km	1	Max Bögl	April 2011	15 September 2020
II	Eroilor – Universitate	5.4 km	3	-	TBA	2025 (est.)
II	Universitate – Iancului	5.4 km	3	-	TBA	2025 (est.)
III	Iancului – Pantelimon	3.8 km	6	-	On hold	2032 (est.)

Sources: metrorex.ro, adevarul.ro, wall-street.ro
