= Timpuri Noi metro station =

Bucharest metro station

Coordinates: 44°25′01″N 26°06′47″E

Timpuri Noi
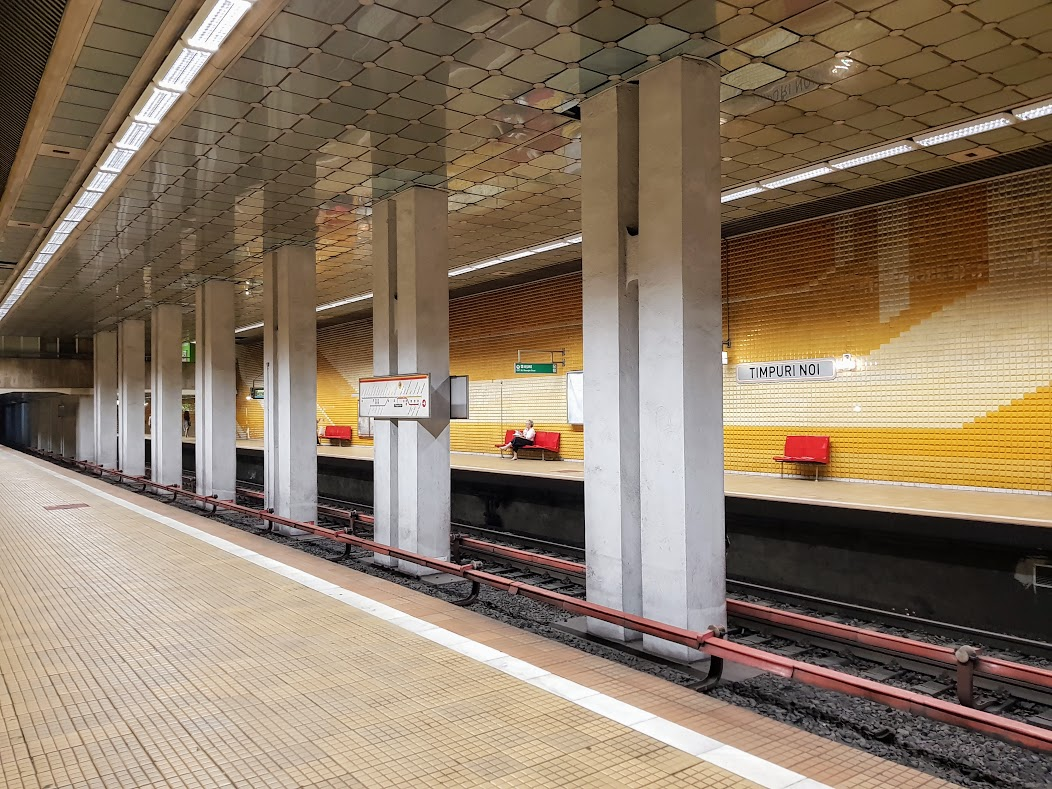
- Metro station in 2017

General information
- Location: Piaţa Timpuri Noi; Sector 3, Bucharest; Romania
- Platforms: 2 side platforms
- Tracks: 2
- Tram routes: 19
- Bus routes: 97, 223, 312, 323.

Construction
- Structure type: Underground

History
- Opened: 19 November 1979

Services
Preceding station	Bucharest Metro	Following station
Piaţa Unirii towards Dristor 2	Line M1	Mihai Bravu towards Republica
Piaţa Unirii towards Preciziei	Line M3	Mihai Bravu towards Anghel Saligny
Location

Timpuri Noi (New Times in English) is a subway station in Bucharest. The name was taken from the nearby mechanical factory. The factory has since been demolished, making way for a planned office and residential development. The station has yellow and white tiling. It was originally the eastern terminus of the M1, being opened on 19 November 1979 as part of the inaugural section of Bucharest Metro, between Semanatoarea and Timpuri Noi. On 28 December 1981, the line was extended east to Republica.

In September 2023, the Metrorex's board of directors announced the intention to rename the station in honor of Octavian Udriște, a former railwayman and one of the Metrorex's first technical engineers and longtime employees, who was among the people who played a vital role to the development of the metro network. The board of directors voted unanimously to rename the station, citing that the Timpuri Noi factory was long gone, but this sparked backlash from residents living nearby who said that the name of the area still lives on despite the relocation of the factory. Shortly after the decision to rename the station, a plaque was unveiled at the station commemorating his work. Metrorex states that the name change will be subjected to public consultation.
