= Universitate metro station =

Bucharest metro station

Coordinates: 44.43595°N 26.10274°E

Universitate
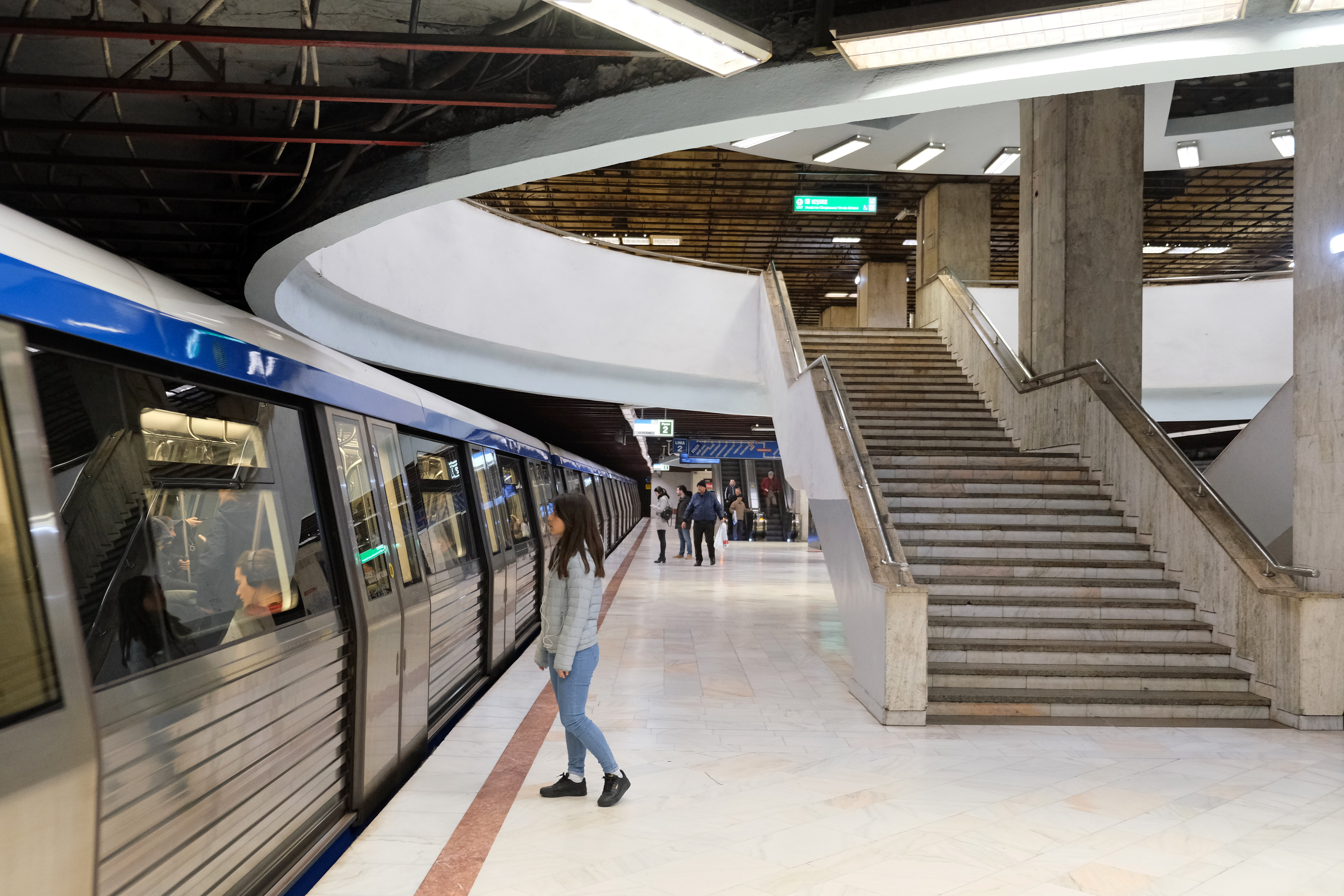
- Metro station in 2022

General information
- Location: University Square; Sector 3, Bucharest; Romania
- Platforms: One island platform
- Tracks: 2
- Bus routes: 61, 66, 69, 70, 85, 90, 100, 122, 137, 311, 381.

Construction
- Structure type: Underground

History
- Opened: 24 October 1987

Services
Preceding station	Bucharest Metro	Following station
Piaţa Unirii towards Tudor Arghezi	Line M2	Piaţa Romană towards Pipera
Location

Universitate (University) is a metro station located in University Square, Bucharest, near the University of Bucharest, the University of Architecture, the National Theatre Bucharest and the InterContinental Hotel. The station is one of the deepest in the whole system, with a narrow platform, built around huge pillars designed to sustain the weight of the lobby/subway.

The station was opened on 24 October 1987 as part of the extension from Piața Unirii to Pipera.
