= Râul Doamnei metro station =

Bucharest Metro station

Râul Doamnei
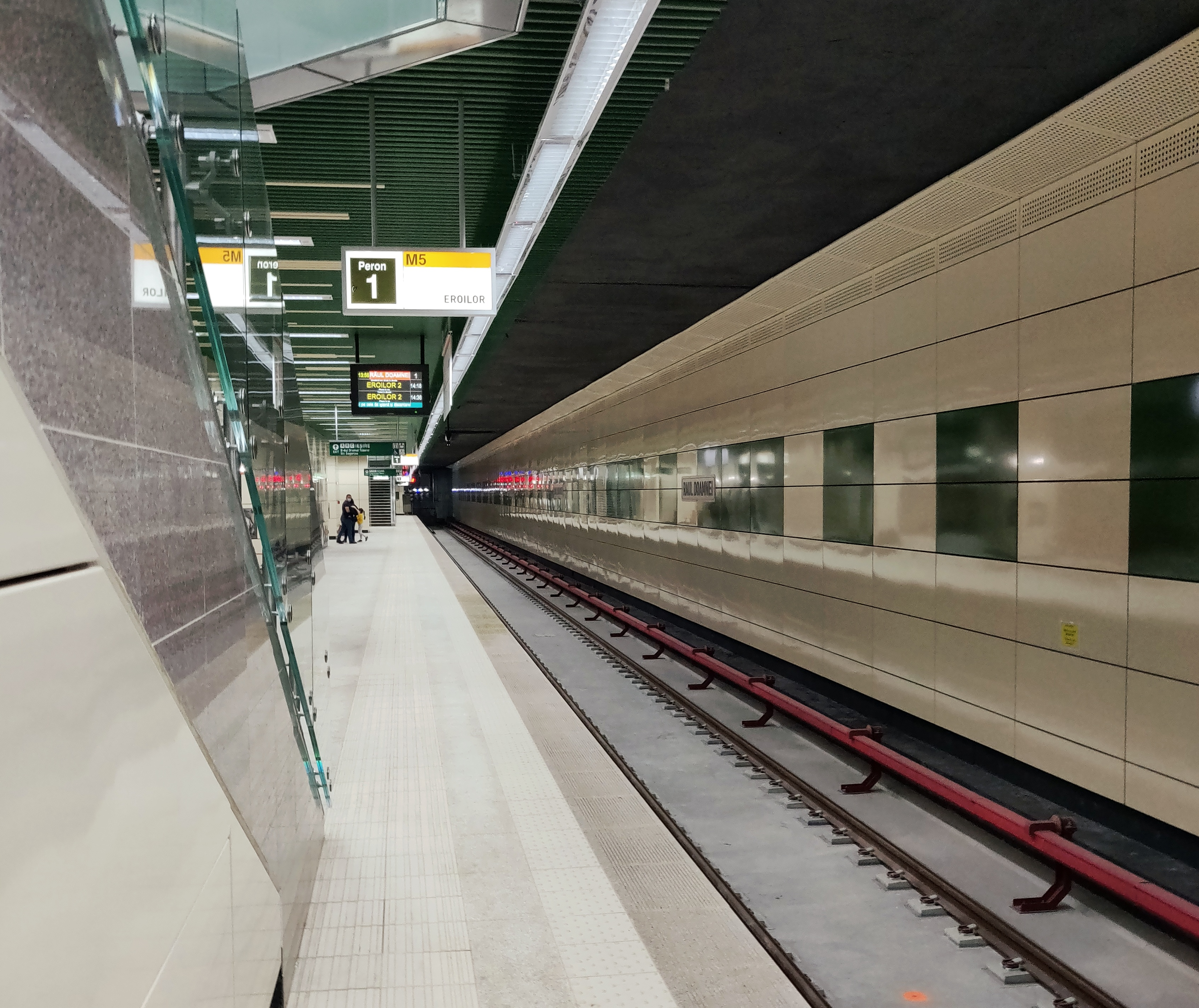
- Inbound track and platform

General information
- Location: Sector 6, Bucharest; Romania
- Coordinates: 44°24′56.2″N 26°1′26.5″E
- System: Underground metro
- Platforms: 2
- Bus routes: 69, 93, 105, 138, 221, 232, 322, 368, 485

Construction
- Structure type: underground

History
- Opened: 15 September 2020

Services
| Preceding station | Bucharest Metro | Following station |
|---|---|---|
| Terminus | Line M5 | Constantin Brâncuși towards Eroilor |
Location

Râul Doamnei (Lady's River) is a station on the line M5 of Bucharest Metro and is its western terminus. The adjacent station is Constantin Brâncuși. The station was opened on 15 September 2020 as part of the inaugural section of M5, from Eroilor to Valea Ialomiței and Râul Doamnei.
