= Valea Ialomiței metro station =

Metro station in Bucharest, Romania

Valea Ialomiței
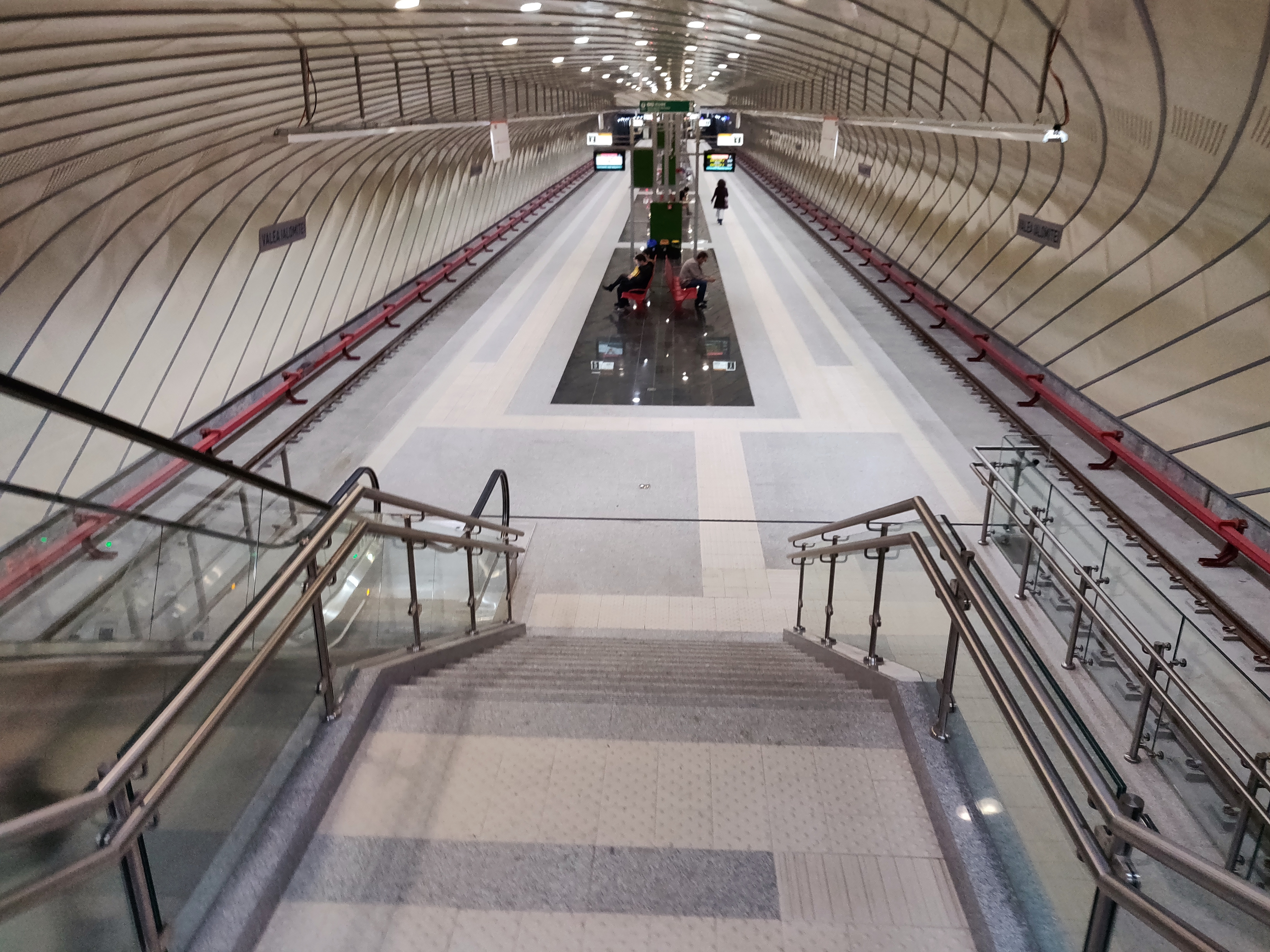
- The station platform - top view, from the main stairway

General information
- Location: Sector 6, Bucharest; Romania
- Coordinates: 44°25′16.3″N 26°0′50.8″E
- Platforms: 1 island platform
- Tracks: 2
- Bus routes: 93, 168, 221, 232.

Construction
- Structure type: underground

History
- Opened: 15 September 2020

Services
Preceding station	Bucharest Metro	Following station
Terminus	Line M5	Romancierilor towards Eroilor
Location

Valea Ialomiței is a station on line M5 of Bucharest Metro. The adjacent station is Romancierilor (towards Eroilor). The station was opened on 15 September 2020 as part of the inaugural section of M5, from Eroilor to Valea Ialomiței and Râul Doamnei.
