= Bucharest Metro Line M1 =

Metro line in Bucharest, Romania

Line M1

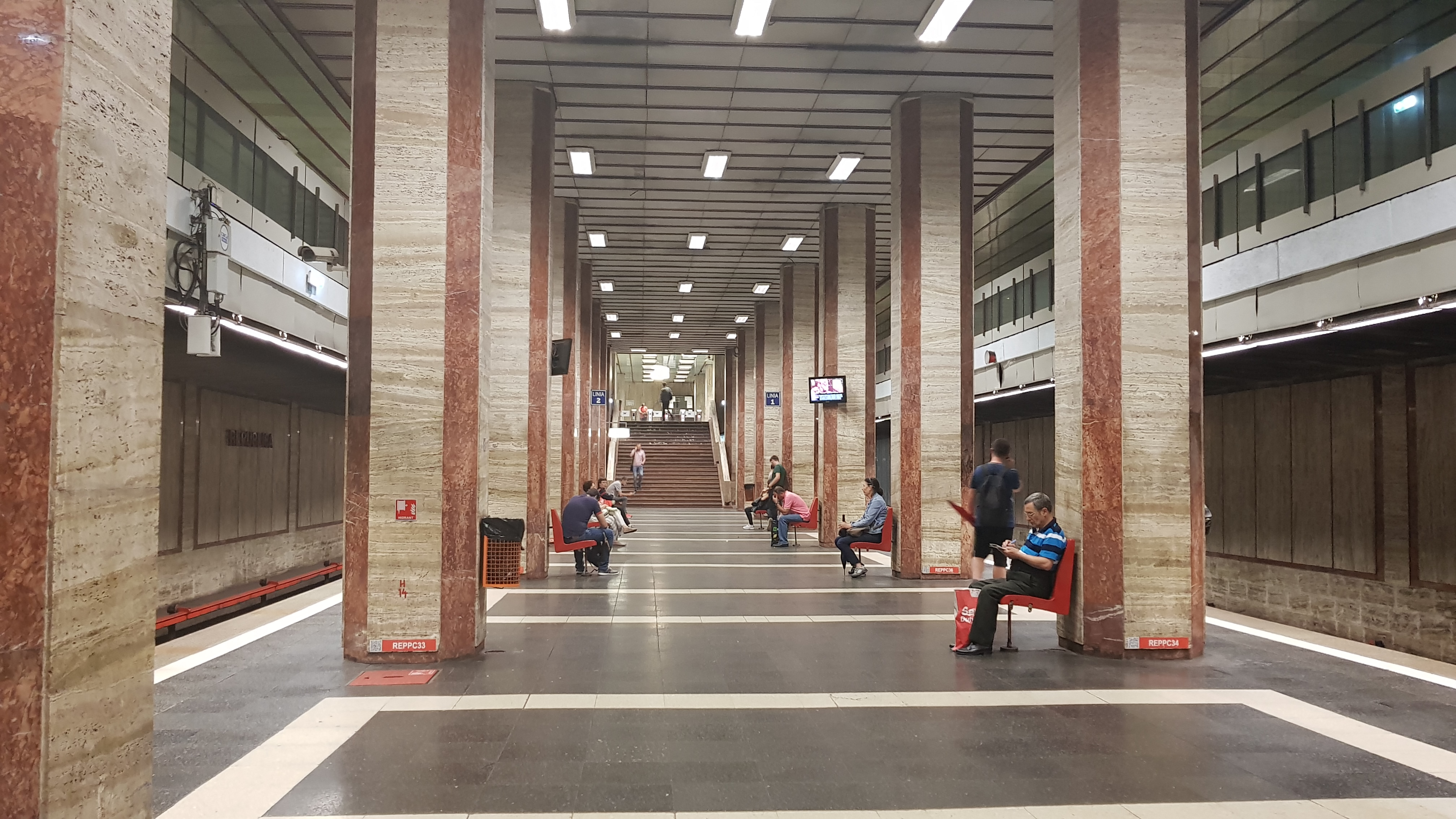
- Republica station

Overview
- Status: Operational
- Termini: Dristor; Pantelimon
- Stations: 22

Service
- Type: Rapid transit
- System: Bucharest Metro
- Operator: Metrorex S.A.
- Depot(s): Ciurel, Pantelimon
- Rolling stock: BM2/BM21 (Bombardier,
- Ridership: 76515000 (2019)

History
- Opened: 16 November 1979; 46 years ago
- Last extension: 1992

Technical
- Line length: 31.01 km (19.27 mi)
- Track gauge: 1,432 mm (4 ft 8 3/8 in)
- Electrification: 750 V DC third rail

M1 (31.01 km (19.3 mi)) is the oldest line of the Bucharest Metro, the first section having been opened on 16 November 1979. The M1 Line runs from Dristor 2 to Pantelimon. Between Nicolae Grigorescu and Eroilor it shares 8.67 km (5.39 mi) of tracks with the M3. Due to the single track between Republica and Pantelimon, which has only one operational platform, most trains terminate at Republica and about one in three reaches at Pantelimon.

== History ==
Construction of the line began in 1975, three years after the Bucharest Metro Committee was formed. The chosen route would run along the Dâmbovița river, from Timpuri Noi to Semănătoarea (today Petrache Poenaru), with the depot based at Ciurel. The ends of the line were factories, because the initial objective of the system was to transport people to the factories where they worked.

This section was opened on 16 November 1979 and was 8.63 kilometres (5.36 mi) long, however the first train didn't run until the 19th and the "official" opening by Nicolae Ceaușescu only happened on 16 December that year.

The second section of the line opened on 28 December 1981 from Timpuri Noi to Republica, this time 10.1 kilometres (6.3 mi) long. A few extensions followed, namely the branch line from Eroilor to Industriilor (today Preciziei) in 1983, from Semănătoarea to Crângași in 1984 and then to Gara de Nord in 1987. In 1989 the section between Gara de Nord and Dristor 2 was opened, however at the time this was considered the M3, thus completing the Crângași-Dristor branch. It was also initially supposed to reach the Pantelimon housing estate, but these plans were abandoned. This section was later integrated into the M1 and the Eroilor - Industriilor section became the M3.

The newest part of the line is from Republica to Pantelimon, also known as Antilopa station, which was opened in May 1991 as a one-station extension from Republica. As stated above, due to the size of Pantelimon station only roughly one in three trains terminate there, the rest terminating at Republica. Thus, although part of line M1, some Bucharest city tourist maps show this short section in a different colour from the rest of the line (usually black).

== Rolling stock ==
The M1 line uses Bombardier Movia trains. These were employed firstly on the M2 in 2000s, until a second batch was introduced on the M1. The line also used to operate Astra IVA trains from its inception until the 2010s when Metrorex started to phase out the old trains.

== Name changes ==
Station	Previous name(s)	Years			
Petrache Poenaru	Semănătoarea	1979–2009			
Costin Georgian	Muncii	1981–1992			
Pantelimon	Antilopa	1981–1992	Nicolae Grigorescu	Leontin Sălăjan	1981–1990
