= Republica metro station =

Bucharest metro station

Coordinates: 44°26′04″N 26°11′09″E

Republica
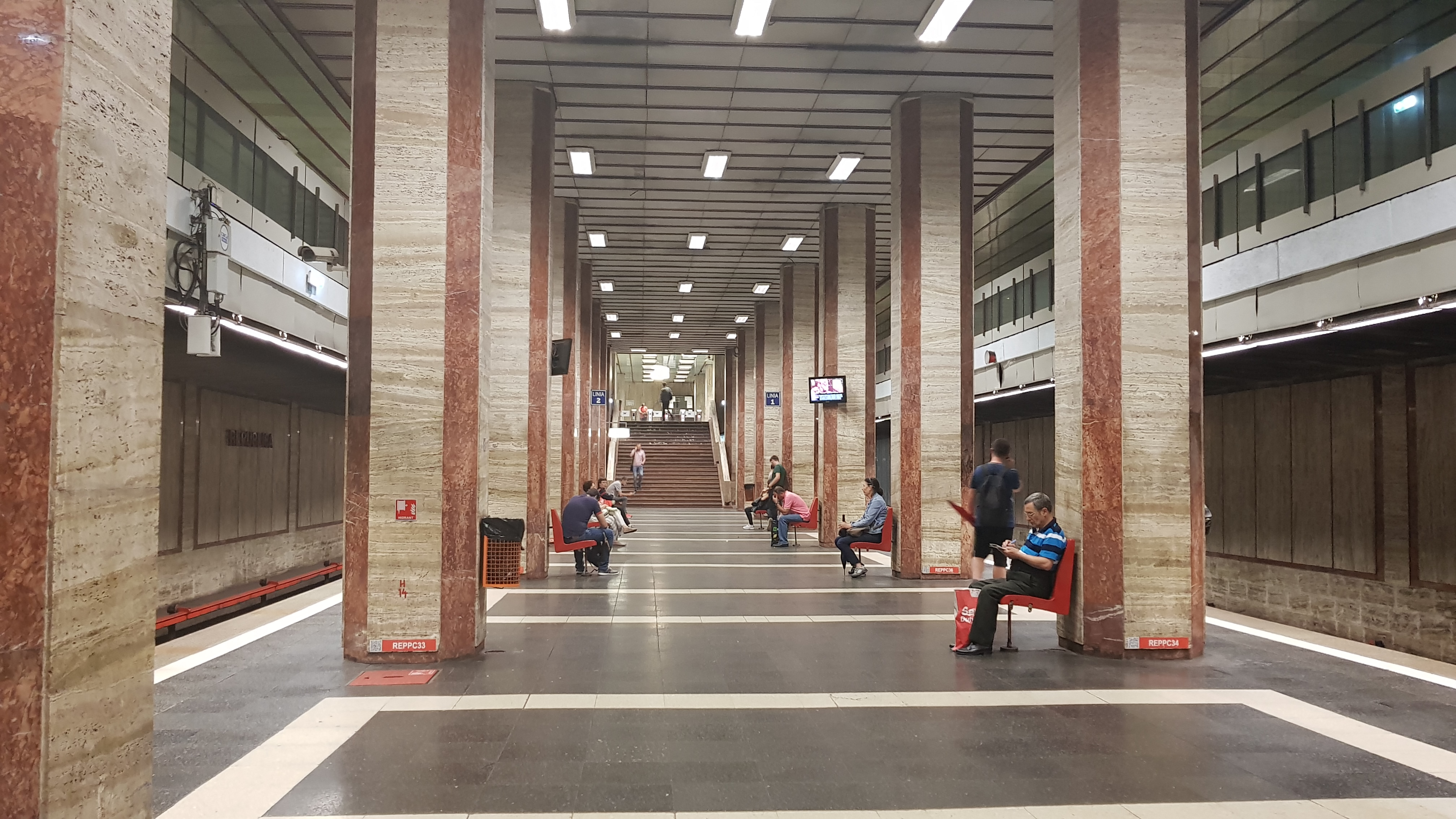
- Metro station in 2018

General information
- Location: Titan South Train Station; Sector 3, Bucharest; Romania
- Platforms: 1 island platform
- Tracks: 2
- Bus routes: 103, 640

Construction
- Structure type: Underground

History
- Opened: 28 December 1981

Services
Preceding station	Bucharest Metro	Following station
Costin Georgian towards Dristor 2	Line M1	Terminus
Terminus	Line M1	Pantelimon Terminus
Location

Republica is a metro station in Bucharest, servicing the heavy machinery plant with the same name and the Carrefour hypermarket located in the vicinity. Also, the Titan Sud train station is located in the immediate vicinity.

It is also the terminus for most trains of M1, as between Republica and Pantelimon metro station, the only service provided is a train every 20 minutes.

The station was opened on 28 December 1981 as the eastern terminus of the second phase of Line 1 between Timpuri Noi and Republica. In 1991, Pantelimon station opened next to the existing rail yard, and the line was extended.
