= List of trolleybus routes in Bucharest =

Trolleybus network in Bucharest

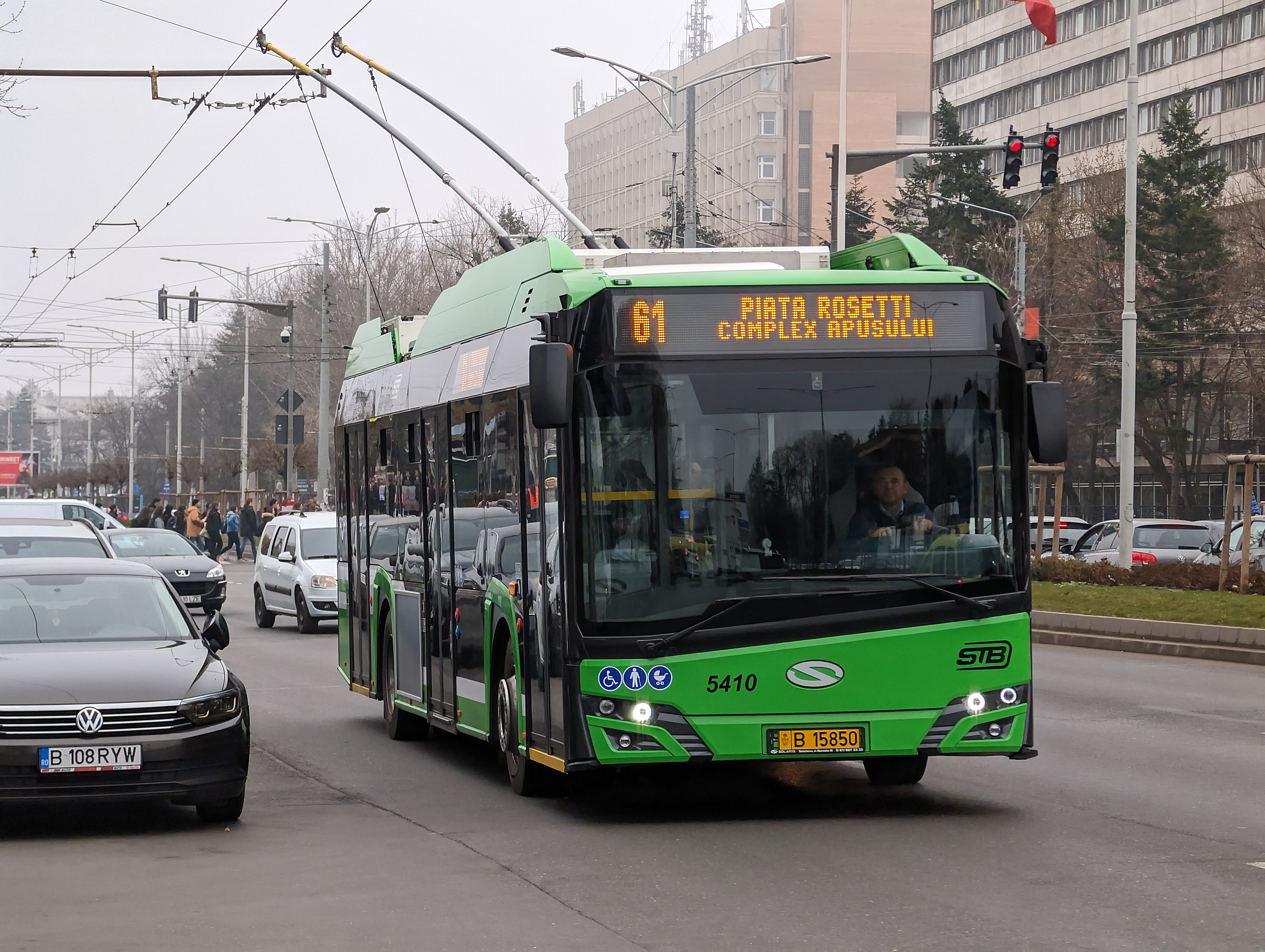
A Solaris Trollino 12M on the line 61

This is a list of the 16 trolleybus routes running in Bucharest, Romania, operated by the city's public transport company, STB as of March 2024. For more information about Bucharest's trolleybus network, see Trolleybuses in Bucharest. Routes marked with use wheelchair-accessible low-floor vehicles (Irisbus Citelis and Solaris Trollino) on some services, however the Ikarus 415T trolleys are more common.

== Routes ==
Route	Start	Via	End	Wheelchair access
61 (Replacing 336 bus route between Piața Rosetti and Complex Comercial Apusului)	Complex Comercial Apusului	Piața Leul M3	Piata Rosetti M2	Disabled access
62	Gara de Nord M1/M4	Piața Leul M3	Colegiul Tehnic Iuliu Maniu (fosta Grup Școlar Auto)	Disabled access
63 (Replacing 136 bus route between C.E.T Vest Militari and Pod Izvor)	Master	Piața Leul M3	Pod Izvor M1/M3	Disabled access
66	Spitalul Fundeni	Bucur Obor M1	Vasile Pârvan	Disabled access
69	Valea Argeșului M5	Universitate M2	Baicului	Disabled access
70	Facultatea de Medicină M1/M3/M5	Universitate M2	Bd. Basarabia M1	Disabled access
72	Costache Stamache	Piața Sudului M2	Turnu Măgurele	only on weekends and holidays
73 (Replacing 313 bus route between Piața Sfânta Vineri and Piața de Gros)	Piața Sfânta Vineri M1/M2/M3	Piața Sudului M2	Piața de Gros	Disabled access
74	Piața Unirii M1/M2/M3	Piața Sudului M2	Arcade Berceni	
76	Piața Reșița	Piața Sudului M2	Costache Stamache	only on weekends and holidays
79	Bd. Basarabia M1	Piața Romană M2	Gara de Nord M1/M4	Disabled access
85	Gara de Nord M1/M4	Universitate M2	Arena Națională	Disabled access
86	Baicului	Piața Romană M2	Cartier Pajura	Disabled access
90 (Replacing bus route 201 from Piața Rosetti to Semănătoarea and Partially replacing route 104)	Complex Comercial Pantelimon M1	Universitate M2	M Petrache Poenaru (fosta Semănătoarea) M1	Disabled access
93 (Partially replacing 105 and 168 bus routes)	Cartier Constantin Brâncuși	Gara de Nord M1/M4	Piața Presei Libere M6	Disabled access
95 (Temporary line, replacing part of 86 and 97 lines, due to construction of M6)	Dridu M4	Parc Bazilescu M4	Străulești M4	Disabled access
96	Depoul Alexandria	Piața Danny Huwe M5	Gara de Nord M1/M4	Disabled access
97 (Replacing 133 bus route between Gara de Nord and Șoseaua Mihai Bravu)	Clăbucet M4	Piața Romană M2	Pasaj Mihai Bravu	Disabled access

=== Lines permanently removed ===
Line 65 Dridu - Sfinții Voievozi (joint route with 86, 95 and 97)

Line 71 Valea Argeșului - Gara de Nord (common route with 93)

Line 75 Gara de Nord - Piața Rosetti (too few passengers and common route with 85)

Line 77 Piața Reșița - Piața Sudului (replaced by 76)

Line 80 Valea Argeșiului - Piața Danny Huwe (combinet by 69)

Line 87 Piața Romană - Arena Națională

Line 91 Depoul Alexandria - Roșiori Square (joint route with 61, 69 and 96)

Line 92 Vasile Pârvan - Barajul Dunării (works at Liviu Rebreanu Street)

== Vehicles ==
At the end of 2015, RATB had in its inventory almost 300 trolleybuses, divided into three brands: Astra/Ikarus (model 415 T), Astra/Irisbus (model Citelis) and Rocar (1 copy 412 EA - Rocar De Simon and 1 copy 812 EA - Rocar Autodromo).

=== Solaris Trollino 12 ===
These trolleybuses are from Poland which is bringing 100 trolleybuses in early 2024, and they are numbered 5401-5500. They were distributed to Bujoreni depots (23), Vatra Luminoasă (14), Berceni (46) and Bucureștii Noi (17). These trolleybuses can run without collectors for about 20 kilometers permitting them to run even on un-wired lines. These trolleybuses currently operate on the 61, 63, 73, 74, 86, 90, 93 and 97 lines. During off-days, could be seen on the lines 62, 66, 69, 70, 72, 76, 79, 85 and 96.

=== Astra Irisbus Citelis ===
These vehicles were brought in 2007-2008 and are numbered 5301-5400. They are low-floor vehicles. They are divided between Vatra Luminoasă and Bujoreni depots. #5399 and #5400 are equipped with an AC traction system and are assigned to the Vatra Luminoasă depot. They are equipped in the Astra Arad factory.

=== Astra Ikarus 415 T ===
There are 195 of these trolleybuses and they were manufactured between 1997 and 2002 at the Ikarus factories in Hungary and equipped at Astra Arad. Initially, they were divided into the Bujoreni (100) and Vatra Luminoasă (100) depots. Starting with 2007, part of them were gradually given to the other depots (Berceni and București-Noi), following the arrival of the new Astra Irisbus Citelis trolleybuses.

== Historical models ==
=== Rocar 412 EA ===
There was only one trolleybus of this type, at Bujoreni Depot. Since 2002 it has been permanently withdrawn from circulation. It has an AC drive motor.

=== Rocar Autodromo 812 EA ===
812 EA was the first RATB low-floor (LF) trolleybus and the only one of this type of Romanian provenance. This trolleybus circulated between 1998 and 2012. It was produced in 1998 at the Rocar factory, using a body from Autodromo, in Italy.

=== Dac 112E ROMANIA ===
Also called ROMAN 112E, this is the trolleybus version of ROMAN 112 UD. It was manufactured between 1975 and 1978. They were used between 1975 and 1991. According to the fleet numbers, there were 320 vehicles.

=== DAC 112 E / 212 E ===
They circulated between 1981 and 2007. They were not numerous initially, their number being reduced (until 1990 there were only 4 vehicles, then after 1990 a 212 E model was also brought). In the 90s and 2000s DAC112 were obtained by shortening DAC117E, probably experimentally. The number of those obtained by shortening in the year 2005 was 8. The reason why there were not many in the 80s, was probably that they had a small carrying capacity, the DAC 117 being considered more suitable at that time. In 2005 there were a total of 12 DAC 112E, one of which was 212 E. They were scrapped in 2007.

=== Rocar 512 E ===
There were 9 trolleybuses at Vatra Luminoasa Depot. They entered passenger service in 1996-1997. They were scrapped in 2009.

=== Rocar 412 E ===
There were two such trolleybuses in the RATB park: #7454 and #7459. The first one was scrapped in 2009, it was allocated to the Vatra Luminoasa depot, the second one was allocated to the Bujoreni depot. #7459 is in the Bujoreni Depot.

=== Rocar 312E ===
There were two trolleybuses of this type. They belonged to the Berceni depot. Currently no longer in circulation

=== Dac 117 E / 217 E ===
These trolleybuses circulated from 1979 to 2007. The first 117 models were tall, then short. Later after 1990, 217E models appeared with a more powerful engine (150 KW instead of 125 KW on most DAC 117E). Some were equipped with choppers.

=== Saurer 5 DUK A ===
They were used at the Berceni depot. Initially they were at the Bujoreni depot. They are trolleybuses obtained from buses brought from Switzerland, with the scrapping norm fulfilled. Since their use as buses was no longer economical, in 1995 the decision was made to transform them into trolleybuses, equipped with choppers and DAC 117 or 217 engines. It is said that these were test models for the choppers that would later equip the IKARUS IK415T. Some of them even had the rear axle taken over from DAC. Currently they are no longer in circulation.

=== MTB-82D ===
The MTB-82 was a trolleybus produced in the Soviet Union between 1947 and 1960 and operated in many communist bloc states. It had a 74 kW engine (80/86 kW according to other sources) and a metal body, which was rare at the time. The power was supplied at 550 V, and the maximum speed was 57.5 km/h. The transport capacity was 65 seats, of which 40 on seats.

=== TV2E/TV20E ===
These trolleybuses ran between 1957 and the early 1980s (about 1985 last vehicles, as school vehicles more). They were the first trolleybuses of exclusively Romanian design and manufacture. The first series was TV2E, which were purchased between 1957 and 1964 and the second series, TV20E, between 1966 and 1970 or a little later. For the most part from a technical point of view they were similar, with small differences in terms of design and comfort, the last TV20E series having somewhat more powerful engines. They were replaced in 1972 or 1974 in the rock program by the Roman 112 series, although they remained in operation until 1985. Based on the TV2E, the TV2EA was built, an articulated variant of the TV2 E. Only 15 vehicles were built and they circulated between 1964 and 1969, only 5 years probably due to multiple breakdowns and high operating and production costs.

== See also ==
- Transport in Bucharest
