= Jiului metro station =

Bucharest metro station

Coordinates: 44.480218°N 26.042908°E

Jiului
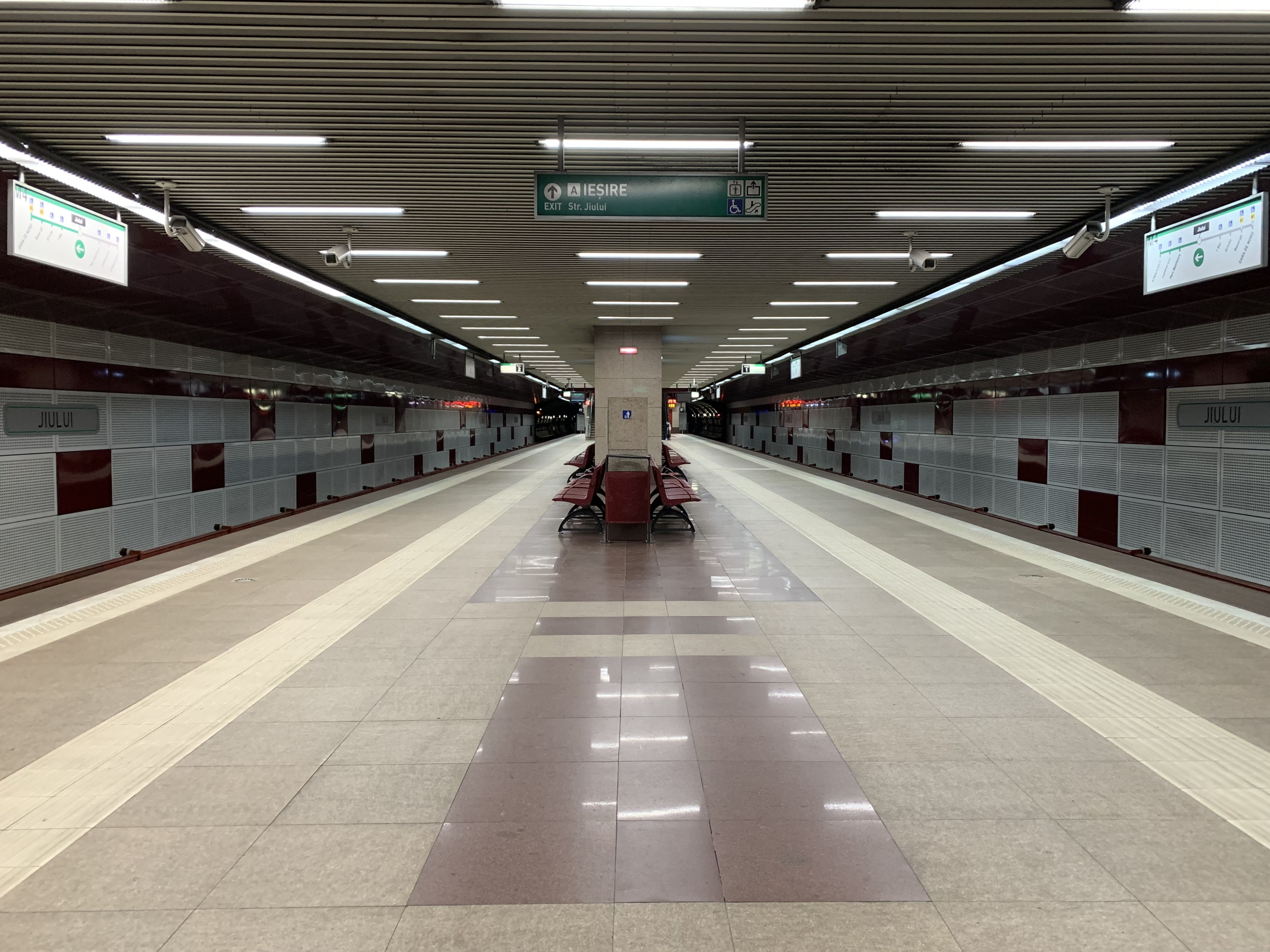
- Metro station in 2019

General information
- Location: Pajurei Street. Sector 1, Bucharest; Romania
- Platforms: One island platform
- Tracks: 2
- Tram routes: 53
- Bus routes: 95, 112, 331, 686.

Construction
- Structure type: Underground
- Accessible: Yes

History
- Opened: 1 July 2011

Services
Preceding station	Bucharest Metro	Following station
Parc Bazilescu towards Străulești	Line M4	1 Mai towards Gara de Nord
Location

Jiului is a metro station in the Pajura district of northern Bucharest, Romania, serving Bucharest Metro's M4 Line. The station was opened on 1 July 2011 as part of the extension from 1 Mai to Parc Bazilescu.

The station is named after a nearby street. Before the opening, the name was changed from the proposed Pajura because the latter was deemed more suitable for a future M6 station located in the same district, but more centrally.
