= Grivița metro station =

Bucharest metro station

Coordinates: 44°27′40″N 26°03′28″E

M4 Grivița
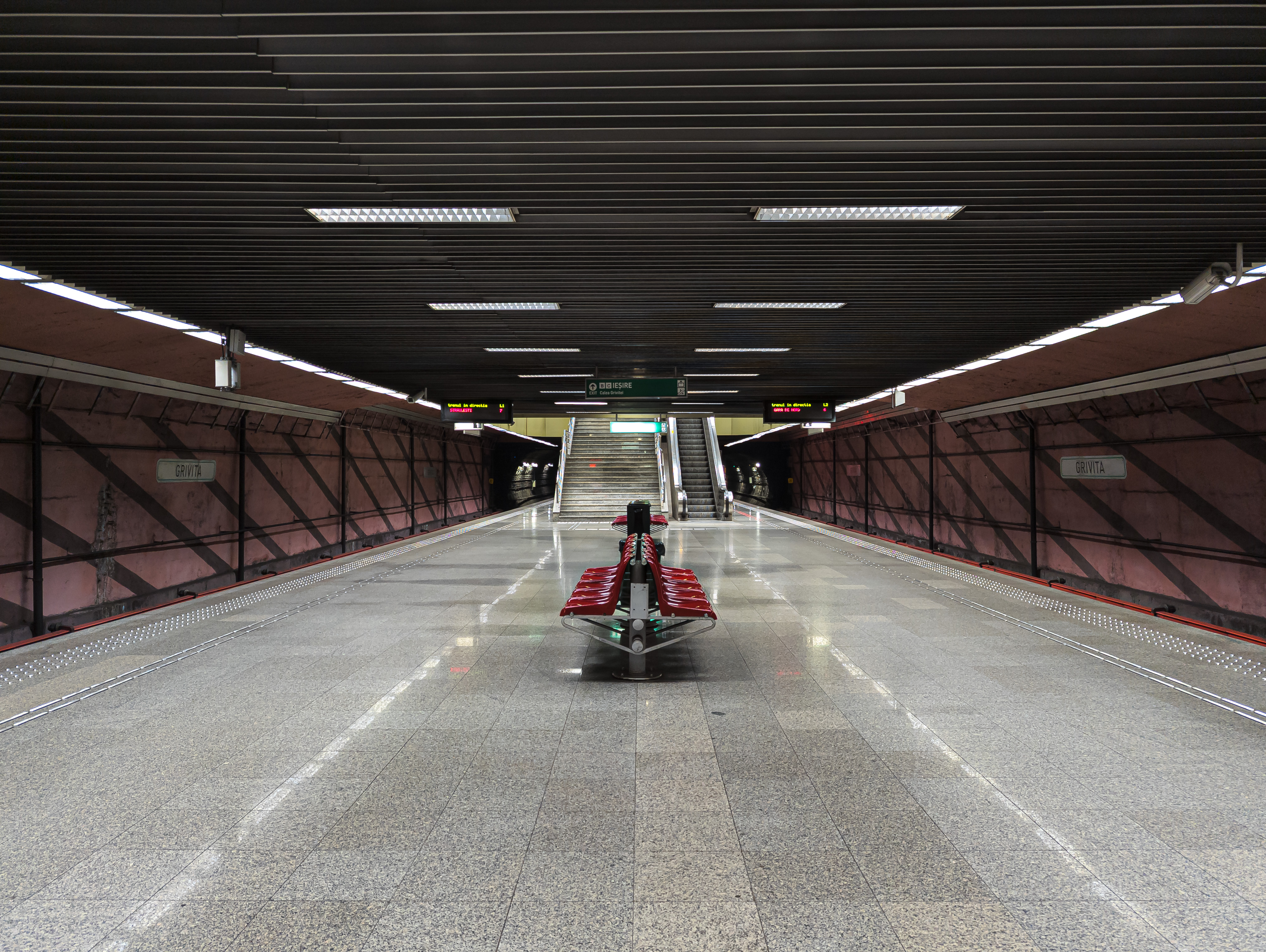
- The platform in 2023

General information
- Location: Grivița railroad workshops Sector 1, Bucharest; Romania
- Platforms: One island platform
- Tracks: 2
- Bus routes: 86, 93, 97.

Construction
- Structure type: Underground

History
- Opened: 1 March 2000

Services
Preceding station	Bucharest Metro	Following station
1 Mai towards Străulești	Line M4	Basarab towards Gara de Nord
Location

Grivița is a metro station in northern Bucharest. The station was opened on 1 March 2000 as part of the inaugural section of the line from Gara de Nord to 1 Mai. It is located near the Grivița railroad workshops.

== History ==
The station works on line 4, which Grivița station is part of, starting in December 1989 but were stopped because of budgetary deficiences in 1994. In the following period the only operations that took place were of evacuating water accumulated from seepage from the unfinished walls, which were subsequently stopped to prevent the deformation of the tunnels.

In 1997 a loan was obtained from the European Investment Bank for co-financing the „Modernizarea metroului din București – etapa I" project which restarted the works. The station was opened on 1 March 2000 together with the initial section of line 4: Gara de Nord II – 1 Mai.

The station has suffered modifications over the years.

Because it has bare walls (similar to 1 Mai metro station), the walls are prone to dampness. To improve their appearance and to protect them, the walls have been repainted (most recently in 2020 in pink) and treated with polyurethane resins.

Tactile paving was mounted towards the end of 2022 for visually impaired people.

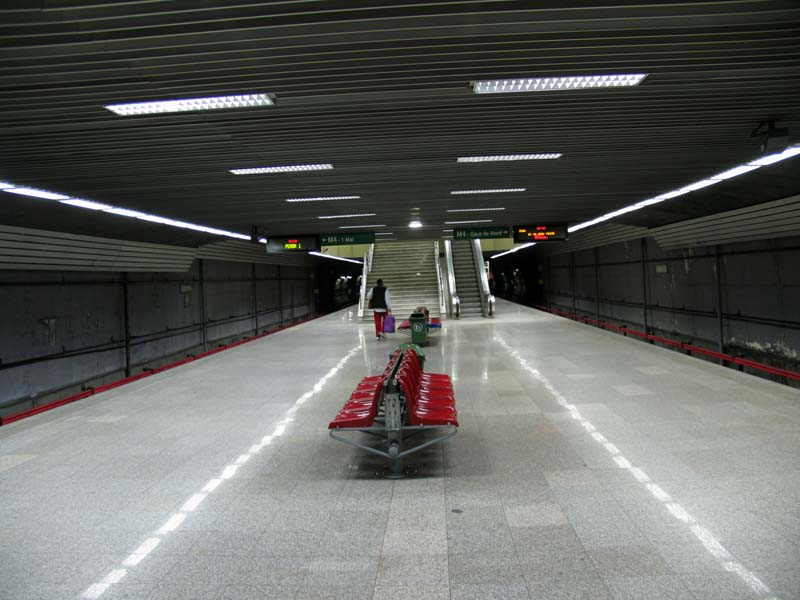
Grivița station in 2005

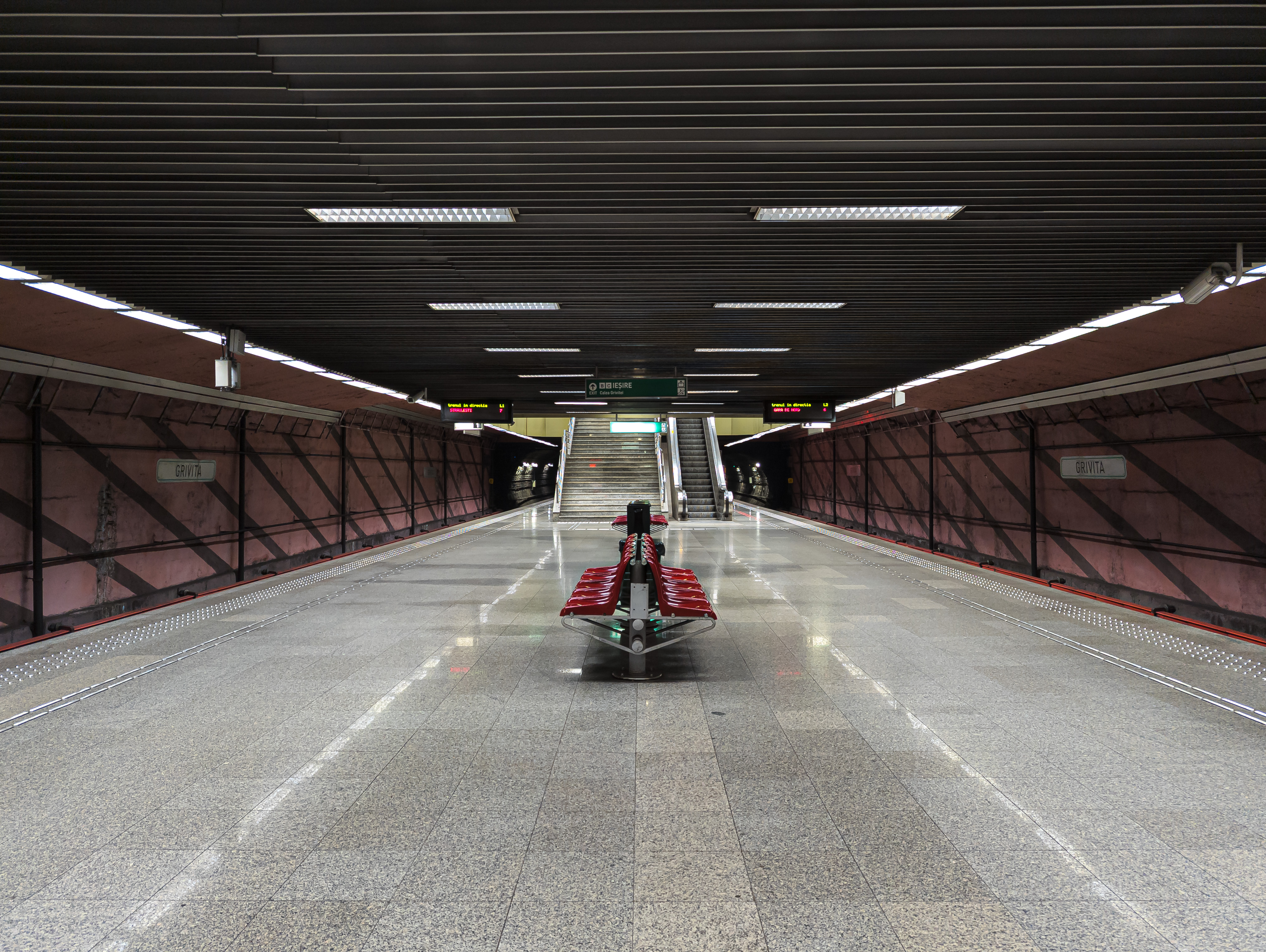
Grivița station in 2023

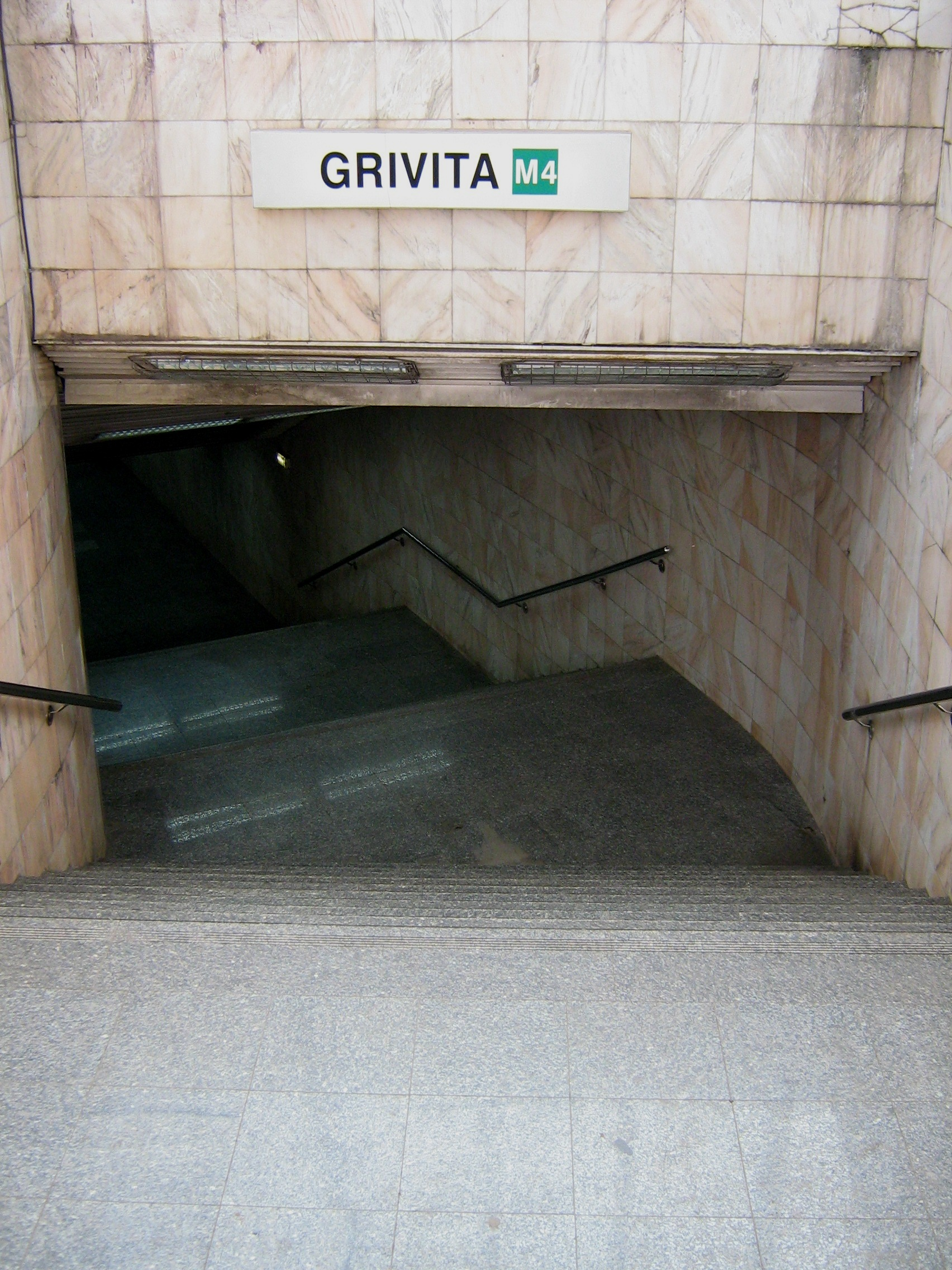
Entrance of Grivița station, 2008

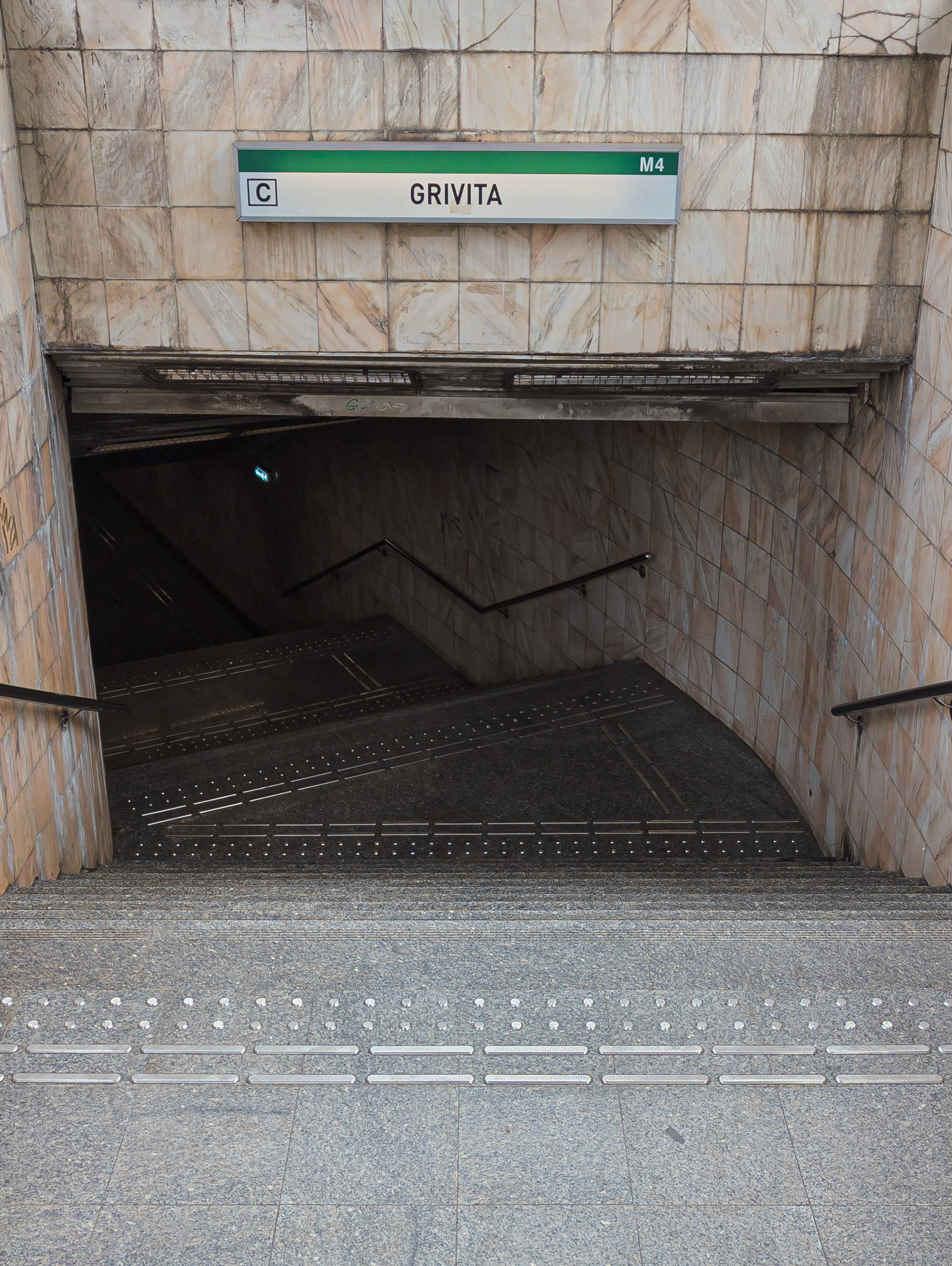
Entrance of Grivița station, 2023

== Architecture ==
The station was built in the typical Gara de Nord – 1 Mai segment architecture, with a central platform and a unified grey-blue colour scheme.

Initially, the station had a grey-blue colour scheme where the lighter floor and central pillars contrasted with the darker side walls. The floor is made out of grey granite, the pillars are rectangular and covered with greenish panels, the ceiling is linear, made of aluminium, the railings are made of aluminium as well and the walls are synthetic and were painted blue.

In 2021, the lateral walls were painted in a pink and indigo oblique line pattern, without any apparent connection with the original architecture.
