= Laminorului metro station =

Bucharest metro station

Laminorului
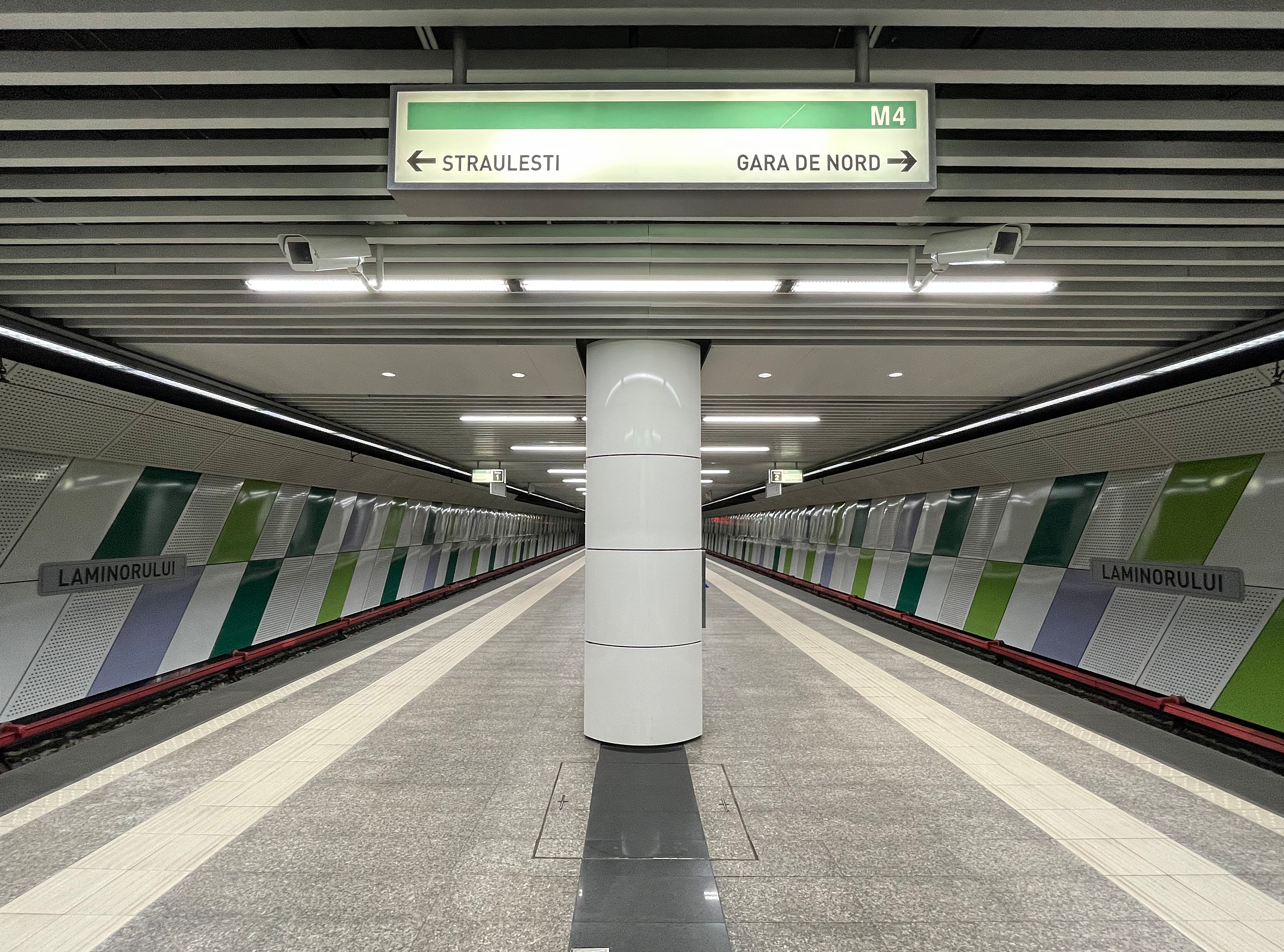

General information
- Location: Bucureștii Noi Avenue; Sector 1, Bucharest; Romania
- Coordinates: 44.4943°N 26.0320°E
- Platforms: One island platform
- Tracks: 2
- Bus routes: 95, 112.

Construction
- Structure type: Underground

History
- Opened: 31 March 2017

Services
Preceding station	Bucharest Metro	Following station
Străulești Terminus	Line M4	Parc Bazilescu towards Gara de Nord
Location

Laminorului is a metro station in northern Bucharest, serving Bucharest Metro Line M4. Although it was supposed to be opened on 19 December 2016 as part of Stage III of M4 line, Metrorex decided to postpone the opening until the first half of 2017, due to safety issues. The station was opened on 31 March 2017 as part of the extension of the line from Parc Bazilescu to Străulești. It is located at the former tram terminal Laromet on line 20, which was closed because of the metro line's construction.
