= Bazilescu Park =

Urban park in Bucharest, Romania

- Parcul Bazilescu
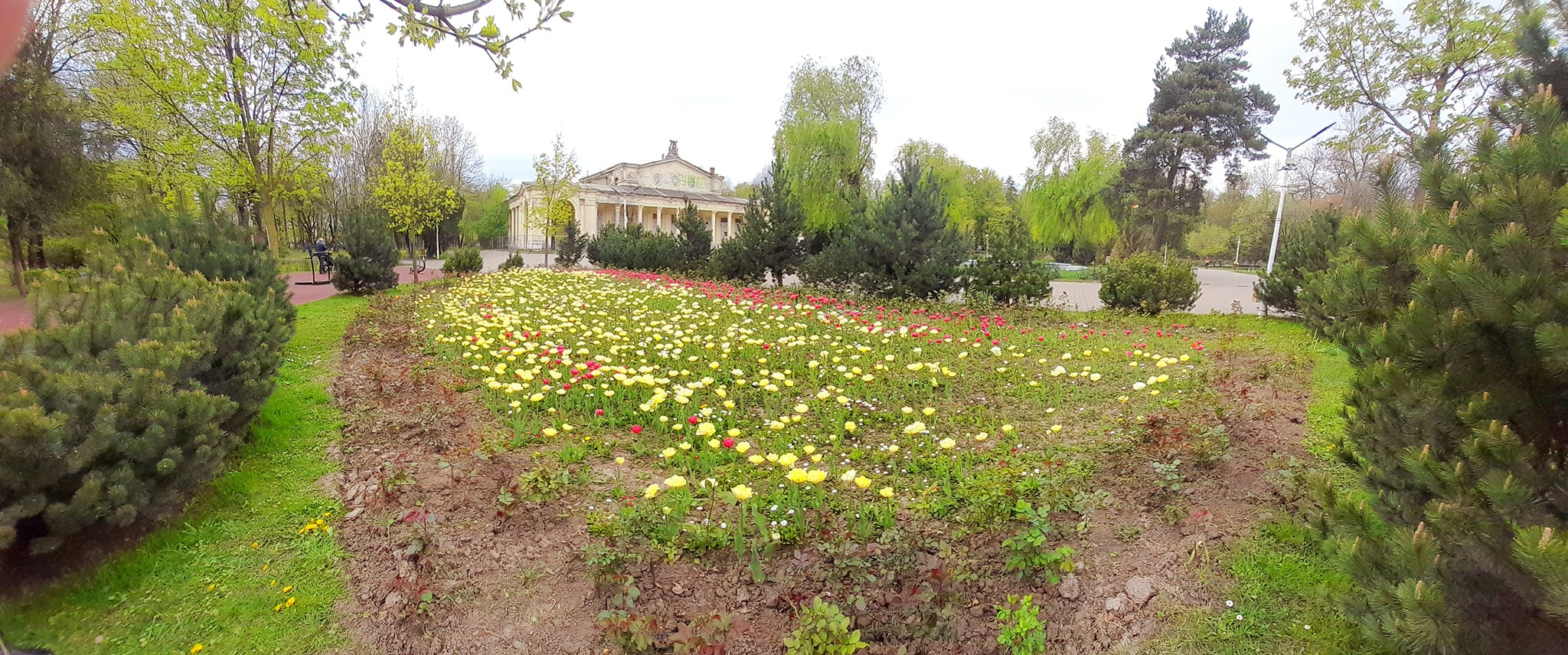

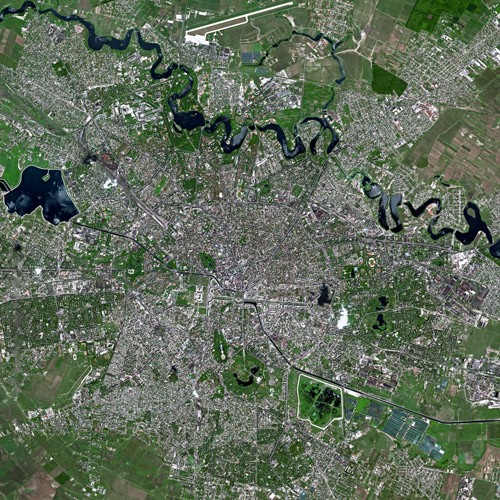
- Location within Bucharest, Romania
- Location: Bucharest, Romania
- Coordinates: 44°29′18.39″N 26°2′3.64″E
- Area: 13.5 hectares (33 acres)
- Established: 1954
- Administrator: Administrația Lacuri, Parcuri și Agrement București
- Status: Open all year
- Public transit: Parc Bazilescu metro station

Bazilescu Park (formerly Nicolae Bălcescu Park) is a park located in the north-west part of Bucharest, Romania, in the Bucureștii Noi district, adjacent to the Parc Bazilescu metro station. It has an area of 13.5 hectares.

== History ==
At the time of construction (1954), the park covered an area of 120 ha (300 acres). The land on which the park was built was donated to the Romanian state by the university professor Nicolae Bazilescu. In 2004 the City Hall of Sector 1 invested over 1 million euros for the development of the park. In the park there are also some old trees, remnants of the Codrii Vlăsiei. Inside the park is the Summer Theater, designed by the architect Paul Emil Miclescu. The Summer Theater is currently in reconstruction.
