= Bucharest Metro Line M6 =

Future Metro Line in Bucharest

M6 is an under construction metro line of the Bucharest Metro. The M6 Line will connect Bucharest North railway station (Gara de Nord) to Henri Coandă International Airport (Aeroportul Otopeni). The line is expected to be completed by 2028. Construction works have effectively started on December 15, 2023 and will be mainly financed by public funding, EU funds and JICA (Japan International Cooperation Agency), for a total cost estimated at €1.2 billion.

== Stations ==
The M6 Line will have a total of 16 stations: 4 stations shared with the existing M4 Line and 12 planned new stations: Pajura, Expoziției, Piața Montreal, Gara Băneasa, Aeroport Băneasa, Tokyo, Washington, Paris, Bruxelles, Otopeni, Ion I.C. Brătianu, and Aeroport Otopeni.

Phase	Terminals	Length	Total stations	Construction since	Opening
I	Gara de Nord – 1 Mai (as part of M4)	3.6 km (2.2 mi)	4	1989	2000
II	1 Mai – Tokyo	6.6 km (4.1 mi)	6	December 2023	2027 (est.)
III	Tokyo – Otopeni Airport	7.6 km (4.7 mi)	6	March 2025	2028 (est.)
