= Bucureștii Noi =

District of Bucharest, Romania

Coordinates: 44°30′N 26°02′E

Bucurestii Noi on the map of Bucharest

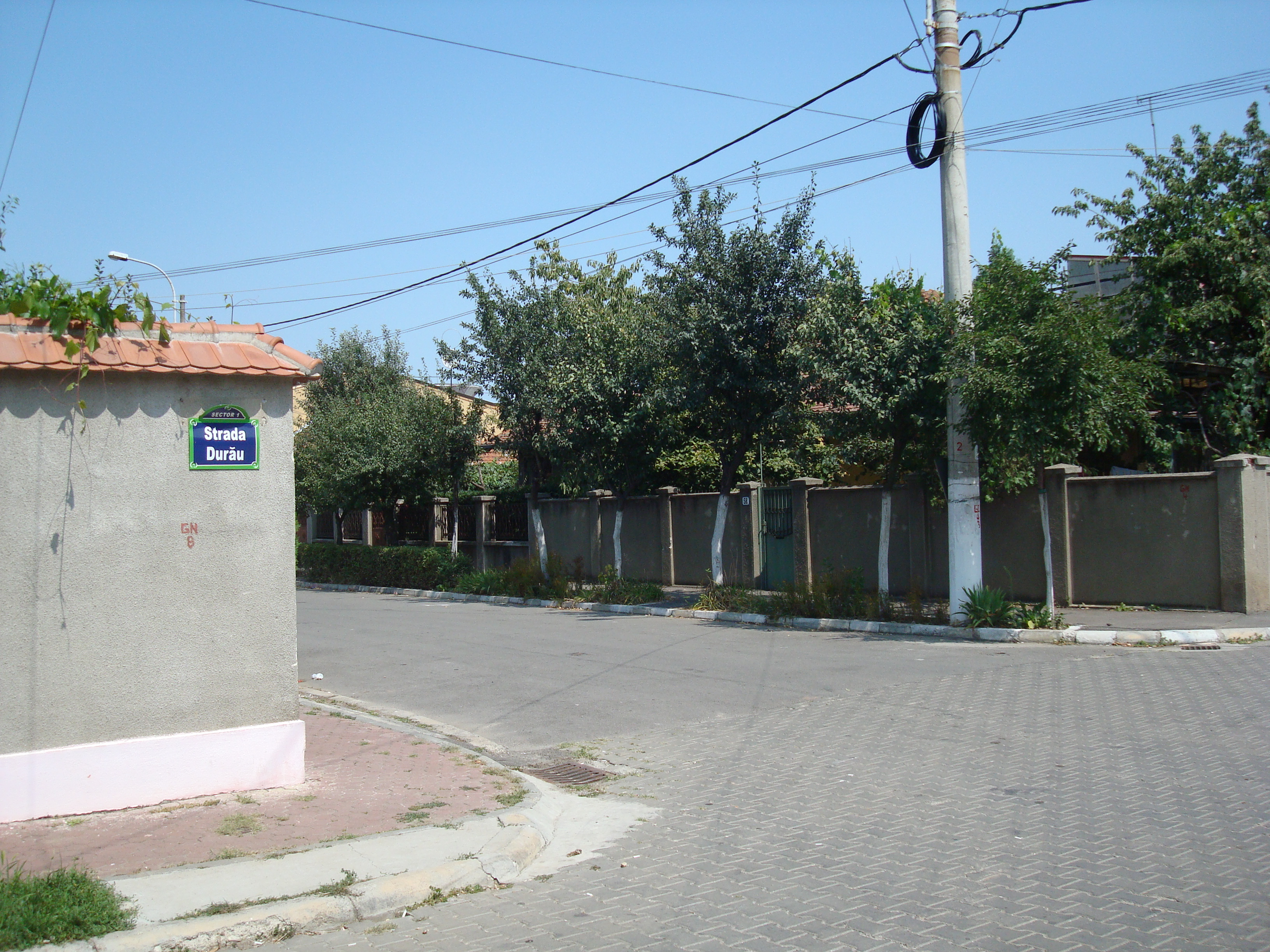
A house in Strada Durău

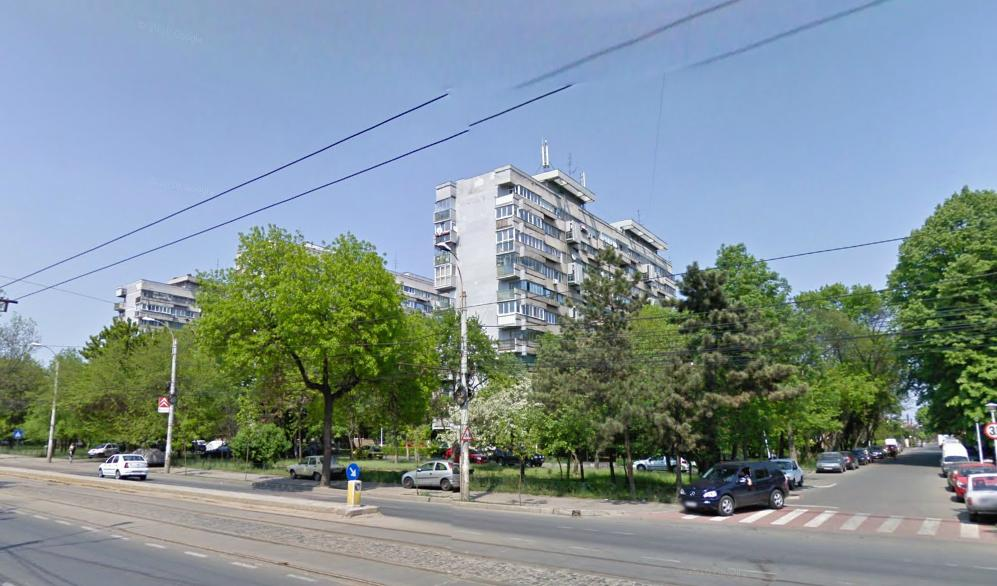
An apartment block in Bucureștii Noi, Sector 1.

Bucureștii Noi (Romanian: [bukuˌreʃtij ˈnoj], New Bucharest) is a district situated in the north-west of Bucharest, Romania, in Sector 1.

== History ==
At the end of the 19th century the area was known as Măicănești or Grefoaicele and was owned by Nicolae Bazilescu. The domain stretched on 295 hectares from which 155 hectares were put out for sale and the rest was donated to the public domain for the construction of streets and parks.

In the past the area was a part of Băneasa commune, then it became a part of the town of Grivița. It was integrated in the Bucharest area in the early 1950s when construction of apartment blocks started on the right side of Bucureștii Noi boulevard, using typical Stalinist architecture. In the mid-1960s, 10-storey apartment buildings were constructed, this time, featuring more modernist styling.

== Overview ==
Bucureștii Noi is a fast-growing district, with many houses and supermarkets being constructed in the last years in the area. The neighborhood center is dominated by a park, Park Bazilescu (also known as Nicholas Bălcescu), opposite the Bazilescu Church.

The streets are in a grid layout, offering symmetrical surfaces of about 300 m^{2} (3,200 sq ft) for the construction of houses or small apartment blocks. The neighborhood contains many penthouses and modern villas which serve a small community of families who own private courtyards. These buildings are an alternative way of living very different from the communist-style apartment blocks found in the other districts of the city.

== Geography ==
The man made Lake Grivița borders the neighborhood in the north and east.

== Transport ==
Residents have access both to Otopeni Airport and to the central site of Piața Victoriei. The district is served by the Parc Bazilescu metro station and the Laminorului metro station. The Bucureștii Noi train station serves the Căile Ferate Române Line 900, which connects Bucharest with the western city of Timișoara.
