= Parc Bazilescu metro station =

Bucharest metro station

Coordinates: 44.4879°N 26.0369°E

Parc Bazilescu
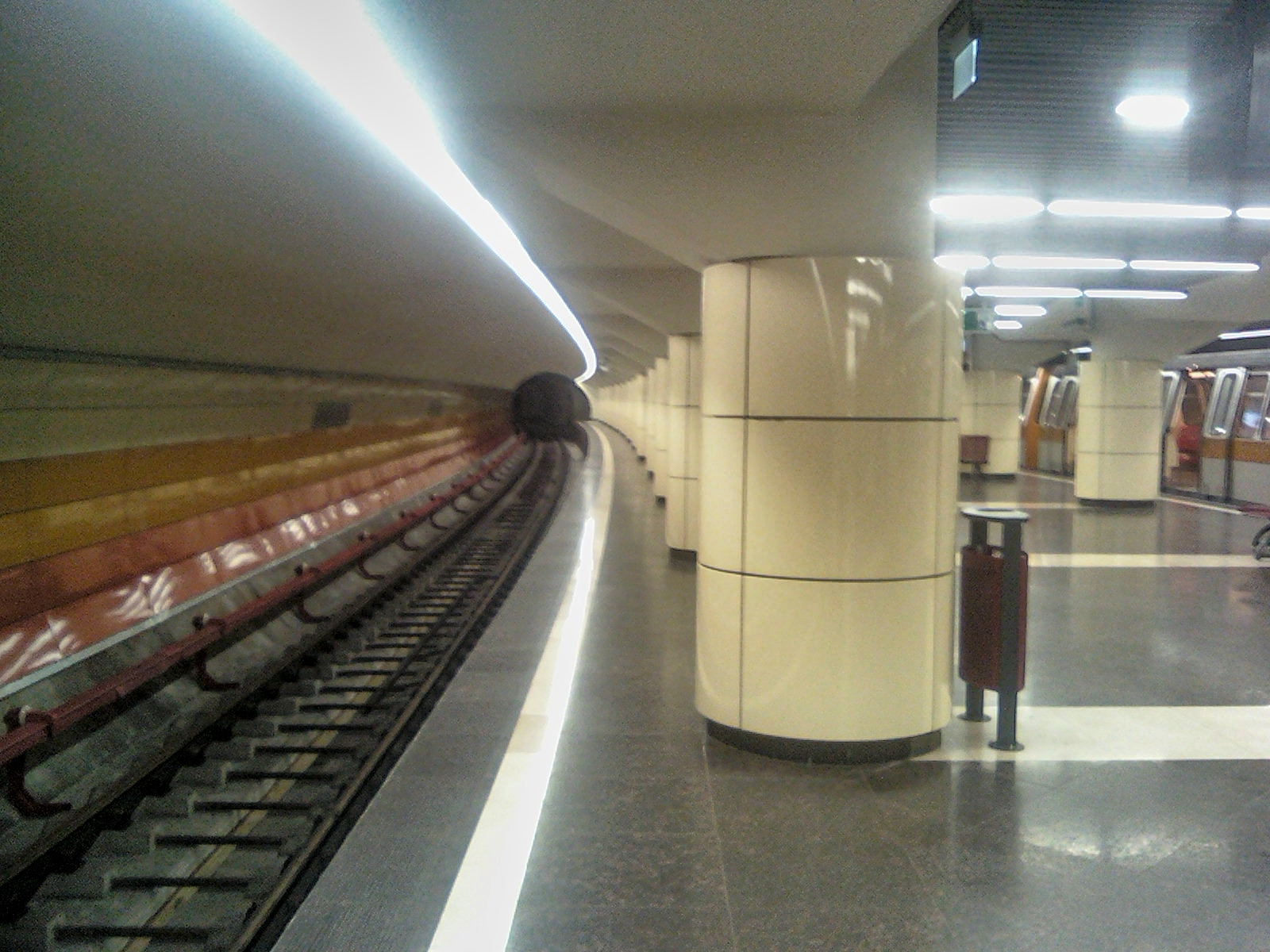
- Metro station in 2013

General information
- Location: Bucurestii Noi; Sector 1, Bucharest; Romania
- Platforms: One island platform
- Tracks: 2
- Bus routes: 95, 112.

Construction
- Structure type: Underground

History
- Opened: 1 July 2011

Services
Preceding station	Bucharest Metro	Following station
Laminorului towards Străulești	Line M4	Jiului towards Gara de Nord
Location

Parc Bazilescu is a metro station in northern Bucharest, serving Bucharest Metro Line M4. The station was opened on 1 July 2011 as part of the extension from 1 Mai. It is named after the adjacent Bazilescu Park. On 31 March 2017 the line was extended to Străulești.
