= Grivița (disambiguation) =

Grivița is the Romanian exonym of Grivitsa, a Bulgarian village that was the site of a battle during the Siege of Plevna in the Romanian War of Independence.

Grivița may refer to:

== Places ==
- Grivița, an area of the city Bucharest
  - Grivița strike of 1933
  - Grivița metro station
- Grivița, Galați, a commune in Galați County
- Grivița, Ialomița, a commune in Ialomița County
- Grivița, Vaslui, a commune in Vaslui County
- Grivița, a village in Cordăreni Commune, Botoșani County

== Other uses ==
- Grivița (vehicle manufacturer)
- NMS Grivița
