= Giurgiu railway station =

Railway station in Giurgiu, Romania

Coordinates: 43°53′44″N 25°57′41″E

Giurgiu
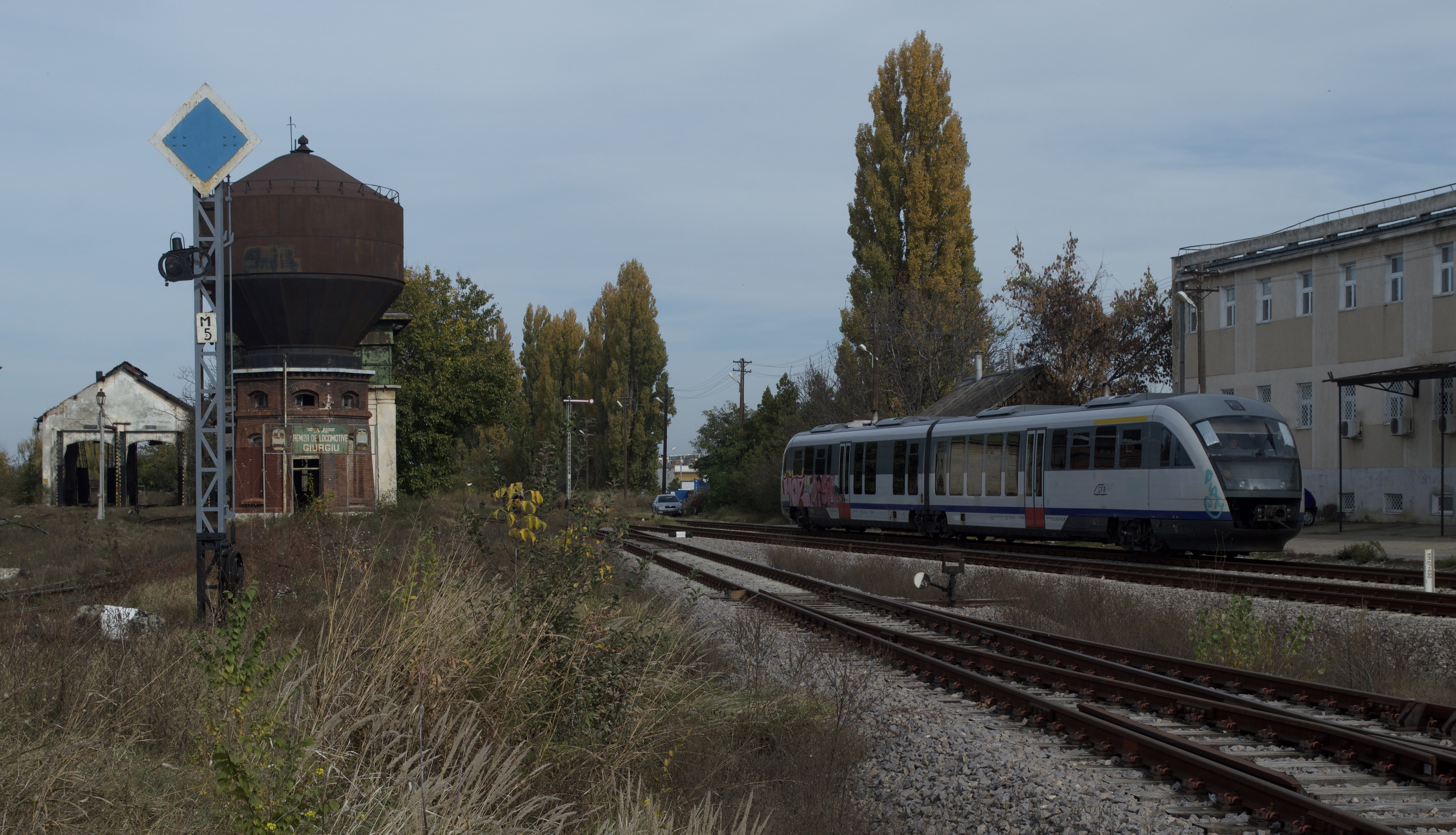
- Giurgiu Railway Station in 2018 with the passenger train that passes through once a day

General information
- Owner: Romanian National Railways
- Platforms: 2
- Tracks: 3

Construction
- Structure type: At-grade

History
- Opened: October 19, 1869
Location

The Giurgiu railway station is a train station in the town of Giurgiu, Romania. The station was opened in 1869 as part of the Bucharest-Giurgiu railway. Today, the station is only served by commuter (personal) trains to Bucharest, Grădiștea and Videle. The Giurgiu North railway station is located about one kilometer north of the station and is serviced by the Bosphorus Express operating between Bucharest and Istanbul.

== Services ==
Previous	Turkish State Railways	Next
Giurgiu Nord; To Bucharest North	Bucharest-Giurgiu Commuter Line	Terminus
Giurgiu Nord; To Grădiștea	Giurgiu-Grădiștea Commuter Line	Terminus
Giurgiu Nord; To Videle	Giurgiu-Videle Commuter Line	Terminus
