= George Tuță =

Romanian politician (born 1984)

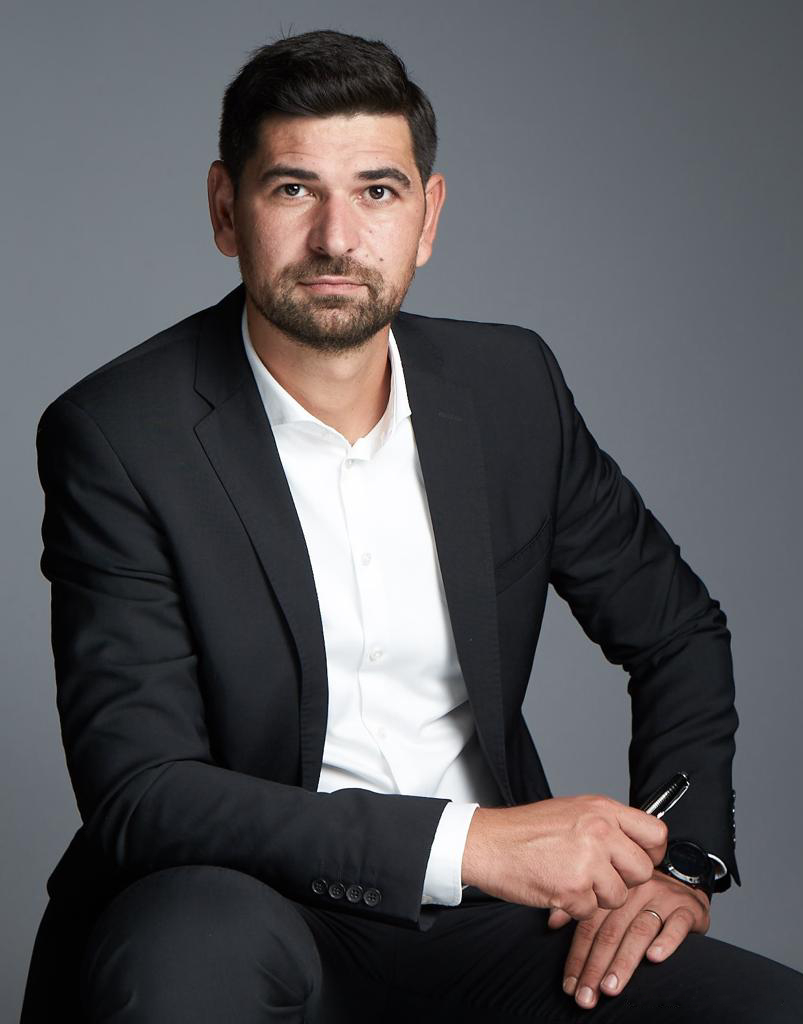
- Tuță in 2024

Mayor of Sector 1
- Incumbent
- Assumed office 1 November 2024
- Preceded by: Clotilde Armand

Member of the Chamber of Deputies
- In office 21 December 2020 – 24 October 2024
- Constituency: Ilfov

Personal details
- Born: 8 August 1984 (age 41)
- Party: National Liberal Party
- Spouse: Iuliana Tuță
- Children: 2

George-Cristian Tuță (born 8 August 1984) is a Romanian politician of the National Liberal Party. who has served as Mayor of Sector 1 since 2024. From 2020 to 2024 he has been a member of the Chamber of Deputies. In the 2024 local elections, he was elected mayor of Sector 1 of Bucharest. From 2011 to 2014, he served as deputy secretary general of the National Liberal Party. In 2023, he was elected interim leader of the party in Sector 1.
