= Piața Victoriei metro station =

Metro station in Bucharest, Romania

Coordinates: 44.45157°N 26.08713°E

M1 M2 Piața Victoriei
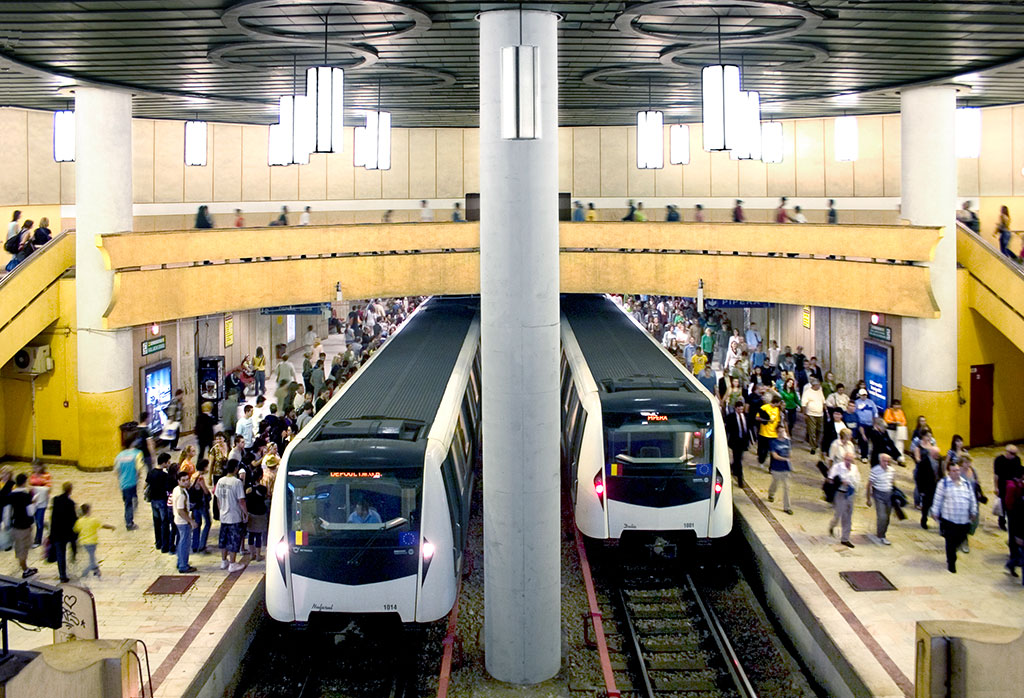
- The upper deck (M2 platforms) in 2009

General information
- Location: Victory Square; Sector 1, Bucharest; Romania
- Platforms: 3 – Island platform for the M1 line, side platforms for the M2 line
- Tram routes: 1, 10
- Bus routes: 100, 182, 203, 205, 381, 642

Construction
- Structure type: Underground

History
- Opened: 24 October 1987 (M2); 17 August 1989 (M3, currently M1)

Services
Preceding station	Bucharest Metro	Following station
Ștefan cel Mare towards Dristor 2	Line M1	Gara de Nord towards Republica
Piața Romană towards Tudor Arghezi	Line M2	Aviatorilor towards Pipera
Location

Piața Victoriei is a metro station in Piața Victoriei (Victory Square), central Bucharest. It is near the Victoria Palace, the headquarters of the Romanian government. The metro station consists of two parts, set on different levels:

- Piața Victoriei 1, serving Line M2, is above;
- Piața Victoriei 2, serving Line M1, is below.

Along with Piața Unirii, the Piața Victoriei station is one of the busiest metro stations in Bucharest.

The station was the setting for many parts of the documentary Children Underground. This station was featured in the newest Addison’s Rae song: Fame Is a Gun – Addison Rae (Official Video)

== History ==
The station was opened in two stages. Piața Victoriei 1 was inaugurated on 24 October 1987 as part of the line II (now M2 line) extension from Piața Unirii to Pipera, while two years later, on 17 August 1989, Piața Victoriei was opened to the public as part of the line III (now M1 line) from Gara de Nord to Dristor, which later became the terminal section of the line.

The station has undergone technical and aesthetic modifications over the years. In June 2017, the original turnstiles were changed with new, modern ones featuring embedded digital card (magnetic stripe card) reader, smart card radio-frequency identification reader (for contactless transport cards) and point of sale terminal for contactless payments (starting 2020).

After an incident in 2019 when a passenger was hit by a plane of glass that fell from the ceiling in the Universitate station, the false glass ceilings were removed from most stations without any replacement, destroying part of the original architecture and an iconic element of the Bucharest metro. This measure also took effect in Piața Victoriei station, even though there had not been any such event recorded there in 30 years of operation. Currently, the frame of the false ceiling that was left in place and the real ceiling and wiring are exposed.

While the M2 station's design is mostly intact, the walls' finish has been modified many times in the M1 station, currently being a pink-orange colour. The mosaics in the hallways were painted over in 2022, even though they were not damaged and could have been cleaned. Tactile paving was mounted towards the end of 2022 for visually impaired people.
