= Bucharest North railway station =

Railway and metro station in Bucharest

Gara București Nord
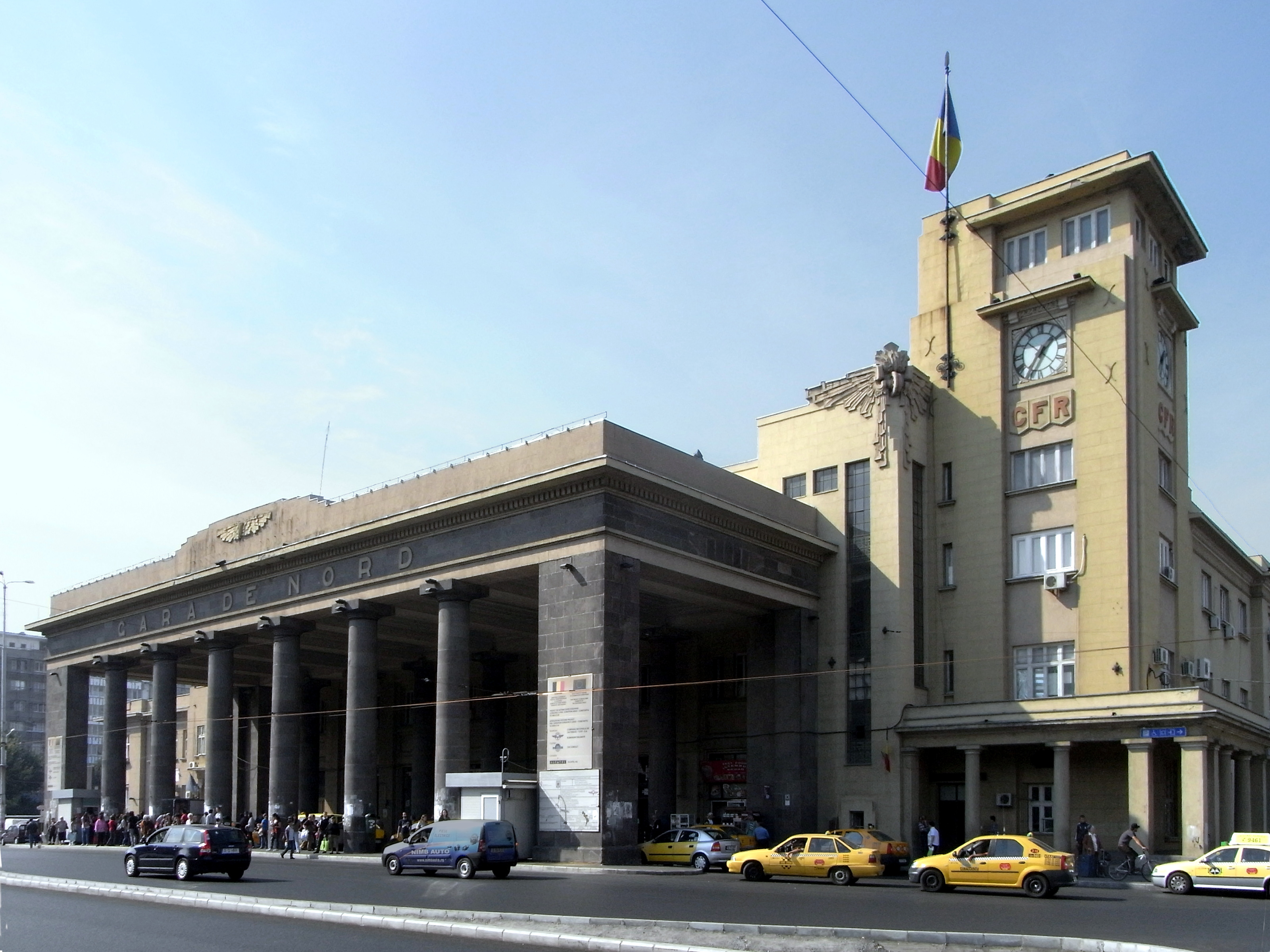
- View of "The Columns", the station's second building from 1938, which features most of the taxi ranks

General information
- Location: Piața Gării de Nord, Bucharest, Romania
- Coordinates: 44°26′46.92″N 26°4′27.15″E
- Owner: CFR
- Lines: Bucharest–Constanța; Bucharest–Craiova: line 300 Bucharest - Brasov via Ploieşti vest Bucharest–Giurgiu; Bucharest–Pitești; Bucharest–Ploiești; Bucharest–Urziceni; M1 Line (Bucharest Metro); M4 Line (Bucharest Metro)
- Platforms: 8
- Tracks: 14

Construction
- Structure type: terminal station
- Parking: yes

History
- Opened: 13 September 1872
- Electrified: 16 February 1969

Services
Preceding station	CFR	Following station
Ploiești Vest towards Arad	CFR Intercity 200	Terminus
Ploiești Vest towards Oradea	CFR Intercity 300	Terminus
Ploiești Vest towards Târgu Mureș	CFR Intercity 400	Terminus
Ploiești Sud towards Suceava	CFR Intercity 500	Terminus
Ploiești Sud towards Ungheni	CFR Intercity 600	Terminus
P.O. Aeroport Henri Coandă towards Galați	CFR Intercity 700	Terminus
Videle towards Timișoara Nord	CFR Intercity 900	Terminus
Terminus	Bosphorus Express	Giurgiu towards Istanbul
Preceding station	BDŽ	Following station
Giurgiu towards Sofia	Romania	Terminus
Preceding station	Bucharest Metro	Following station
Basarab towards Republica	Line M1 transfer at Gara de Nord	Piata Victoriei towards Dristor 2
Basarab towards Străulești	Line M4 transfer at Gara de Nord	Terminus
Location

Bucharest North railway station (Romanian: Gara București Nord; officially Bucharest North Group A; colloquially Gara de Nord) is the main railway station in Bucharest and the largest railway station in Romania. The vast majority of mainline trains to and from Bucharest originate from Gara de Nord.

== History ==
The original North railway station was built between 1868—1872. The foundation stone was placed on 10 September 1868 in the presence of King Carol I of Romania. The building was designed as a U-shaped structure. The first railways between Roman – Galați – Bucharest – Pitești were put into service on 13 September 1872. Between 1895—1896 a new wing of the station was built, which included a "Royal Hall", in anticipation of the visit of Emperor Franz Joseph of Austria-Hungary. The station was initially named Gara Târgoviștei, after the road nearby, Calea Târgoviștei ("Târgoviște Road", now Calea Griviței), and took its current name in 1888.

Prior to the mid 1930s, the station's tracks extended beyond the present-day square into a group of carriage workshops. These workshops were demolished to make way for the Ministry of Railways building, for which construction began in 1938 and ended in 1950. In 1938, the second building (colloquially known as "the columns", in an art deco style) was completed.

The station and its surroundings were heavily bombed by the Allies in April 1944 during a campaign aimed at Axis supply lines. The station was a crucial point in the Romanian railway network, and was the main departure point for troops headed to the Eastern Front (see: Bombing of Bucharest in World War II).

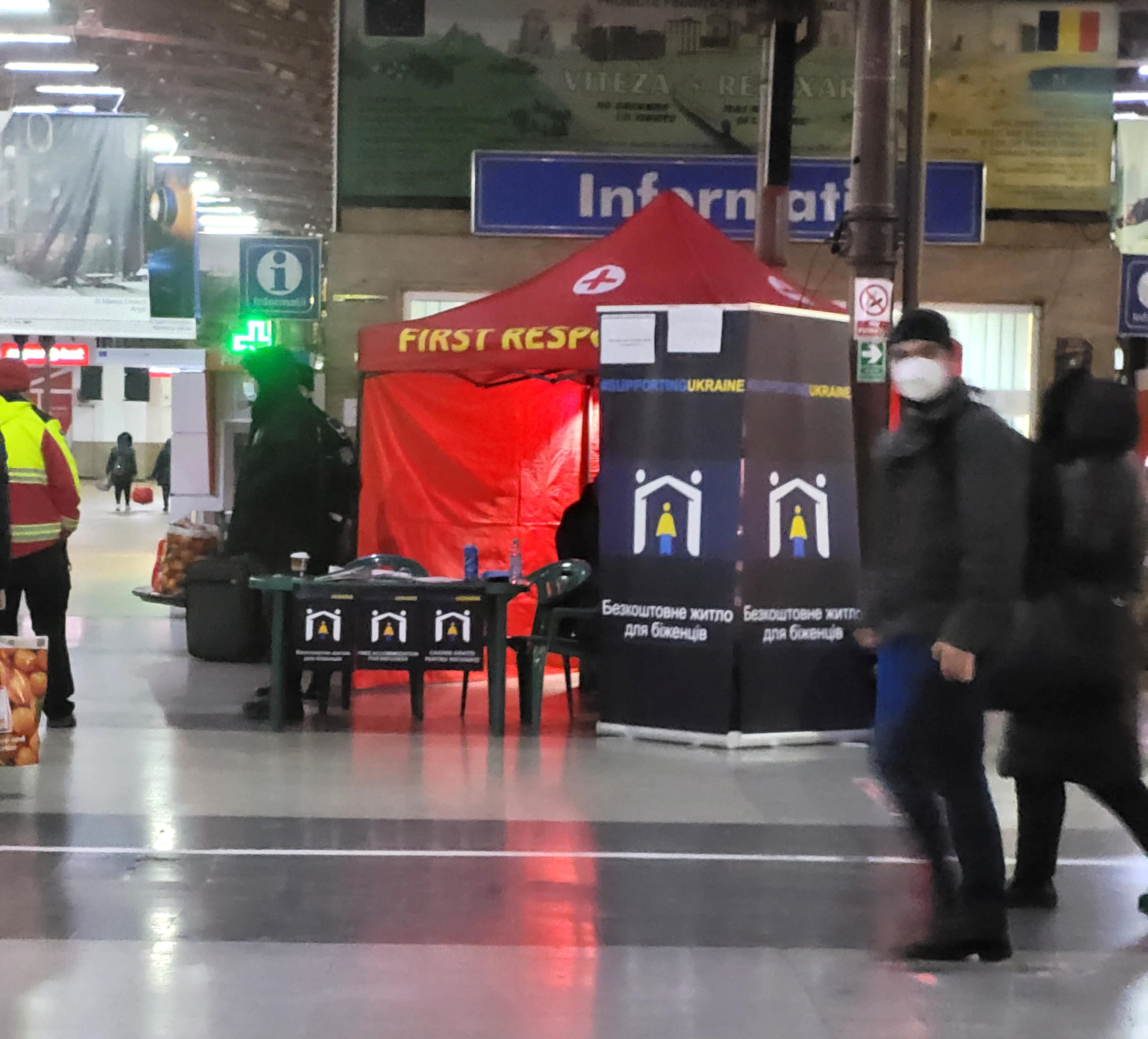
Non-stop information and coordination point in Bucharest North Railway Station designed to provide aid to arriving Ukrainian refugees during Russia's invasion of Ukraine in 2022

During the Communist era, the station received a number of upgrades, such as partial electrification on 16 February 1969, followed by an expansion between 1978 and 1984, and then complete electrification.

In the post-communist era, the station has continued to be upgraded, having received a platform overhaul (the replacement of tiles with asphalt from 2006—2010), the removal of the "temporary" footbridge built in 1927 (replaced with the Basarab Overpass in 2009) and the replacement of the original split-flap displays with LED screens (2018).

During the 2022 Russian invasion of Ukraine, from 27 February 2022 onwards, the station served as a coordination point for Ukrainian refugees. On the first day, almost 100 Ukrainian refugees arrived on five trains owned by Romanian state operator CFR Călători; the trains came from Iași and Suceava, in northeast Romania. Increased security, information points, and food/water pick-up points were set up in anticipation of the arrival of Ukrainian refugees. Representatives of municipal government and NGOs, also contributed to the maintenance of a non-stop information and coordination point, where Ukrainian-speaking volunteers provided information. Information was also presented in English through loudspeakers. At midnight on 4 March 2022, approximately 1,000 refugees arrived from Iași and were later accommodated at Romexpo.

== Current status ==
There are currently 14 tracks and 8 platforms.

As of 2009, Gara de Nord served about 200 routes, including domestic routes operated by Căile Ferate Române, Regiotrans and Transferoviar Călători, as well international trains to Austria (Vienna), Belarus (Minsk), Bulgaria (Sofia, Varna and Burgas), Hungary (Budapest), Republic of Moldova (Chișinău), Russia (Moscow and Saratov), Turkey (Istanbul), and Ukraine (Kyiv, Dnipro and Chernivtsi).

The station is served by several bus (105, 123, 133, 178, 182, 282), trolleybus (65, 79, 86, 62, 85, 93, 96), and tram lines (44, 45), as well as the Gara de Nord metro station. The station is additionally connected by CFR and TFC trains to Henri Coandă International Airport.

== Future developments ==
In 2019, plans were announced by the Government of Romania's Ministry of Transport to convert Gara de Nord from a terminus station to an underground through station, linking it with Bucharest Obor railway station, and to build a partial underground link between Gara de Nord and Progresul.

== Gallery ==
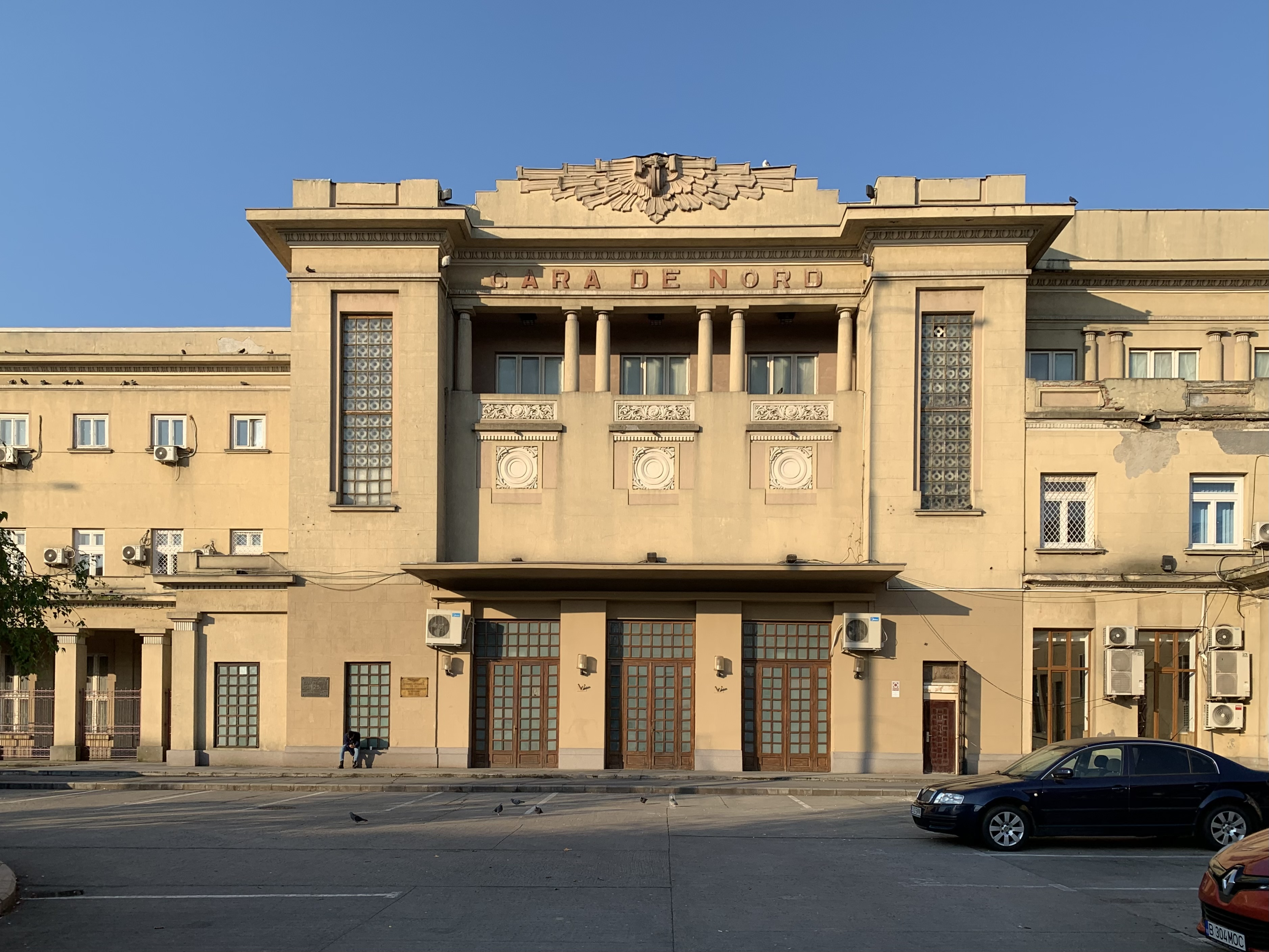
The back facade of the station building

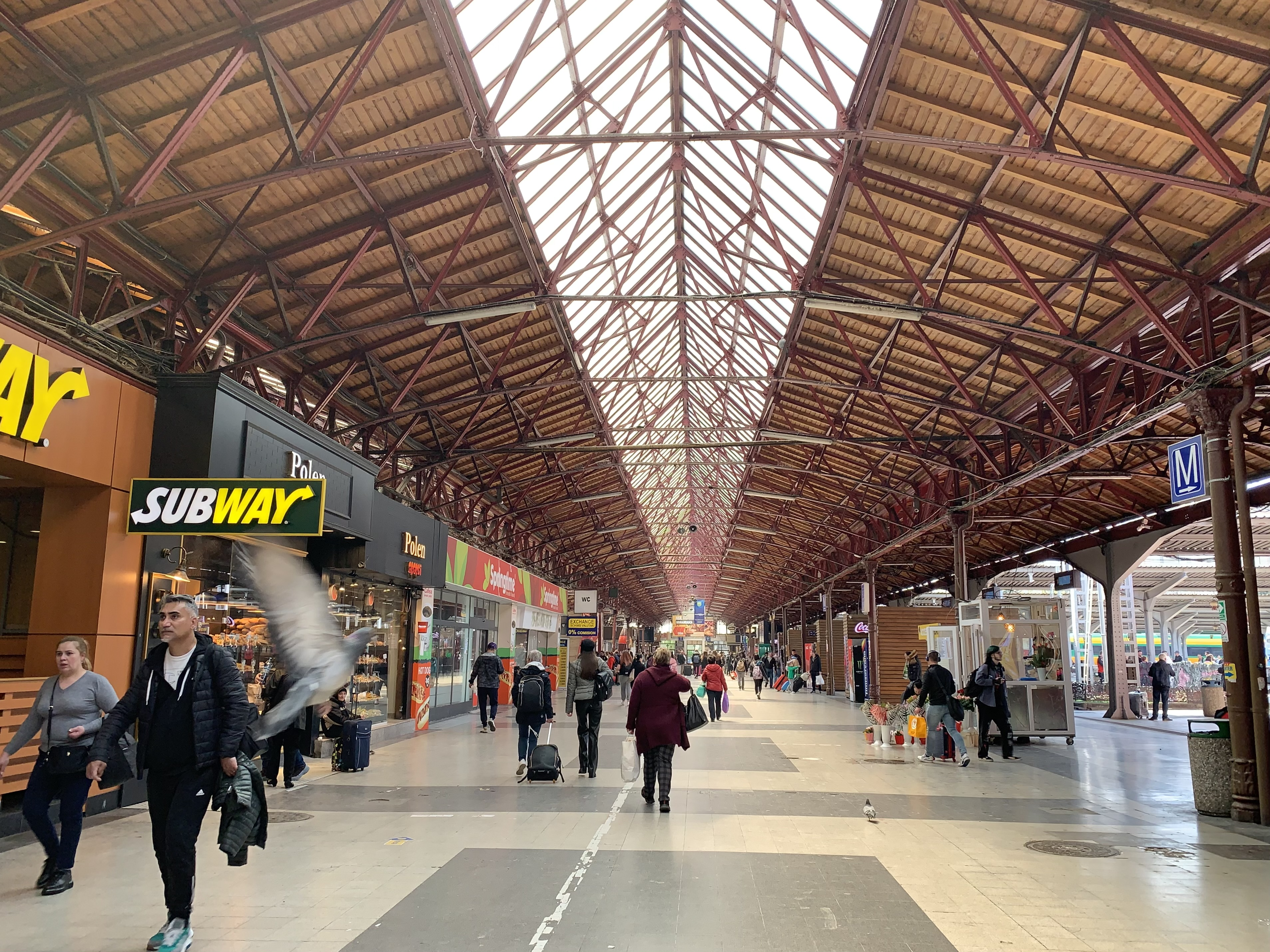
Interior of the station

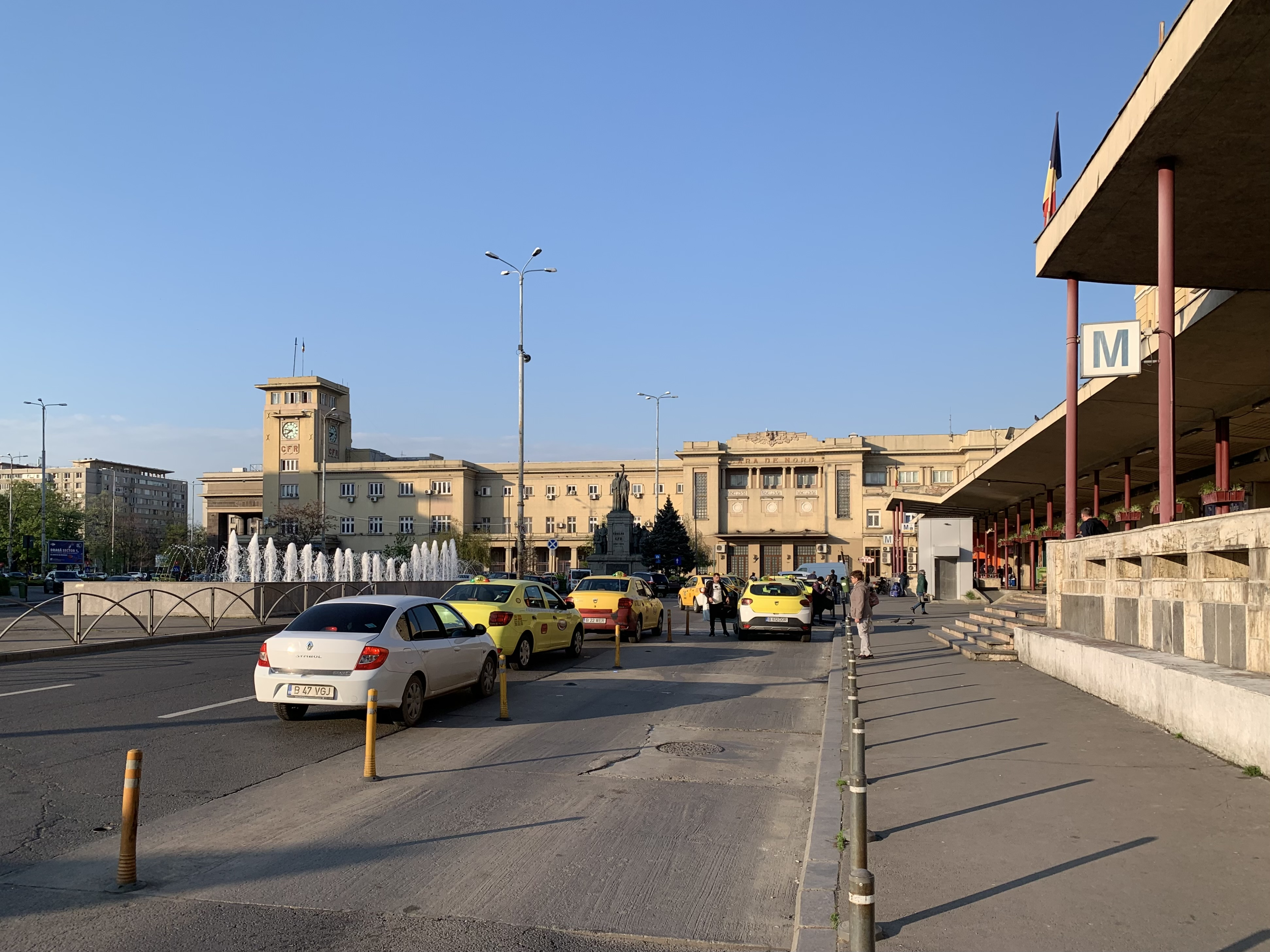
The back facade of the station building with the entrance to the Gara de Nord metro station on the right

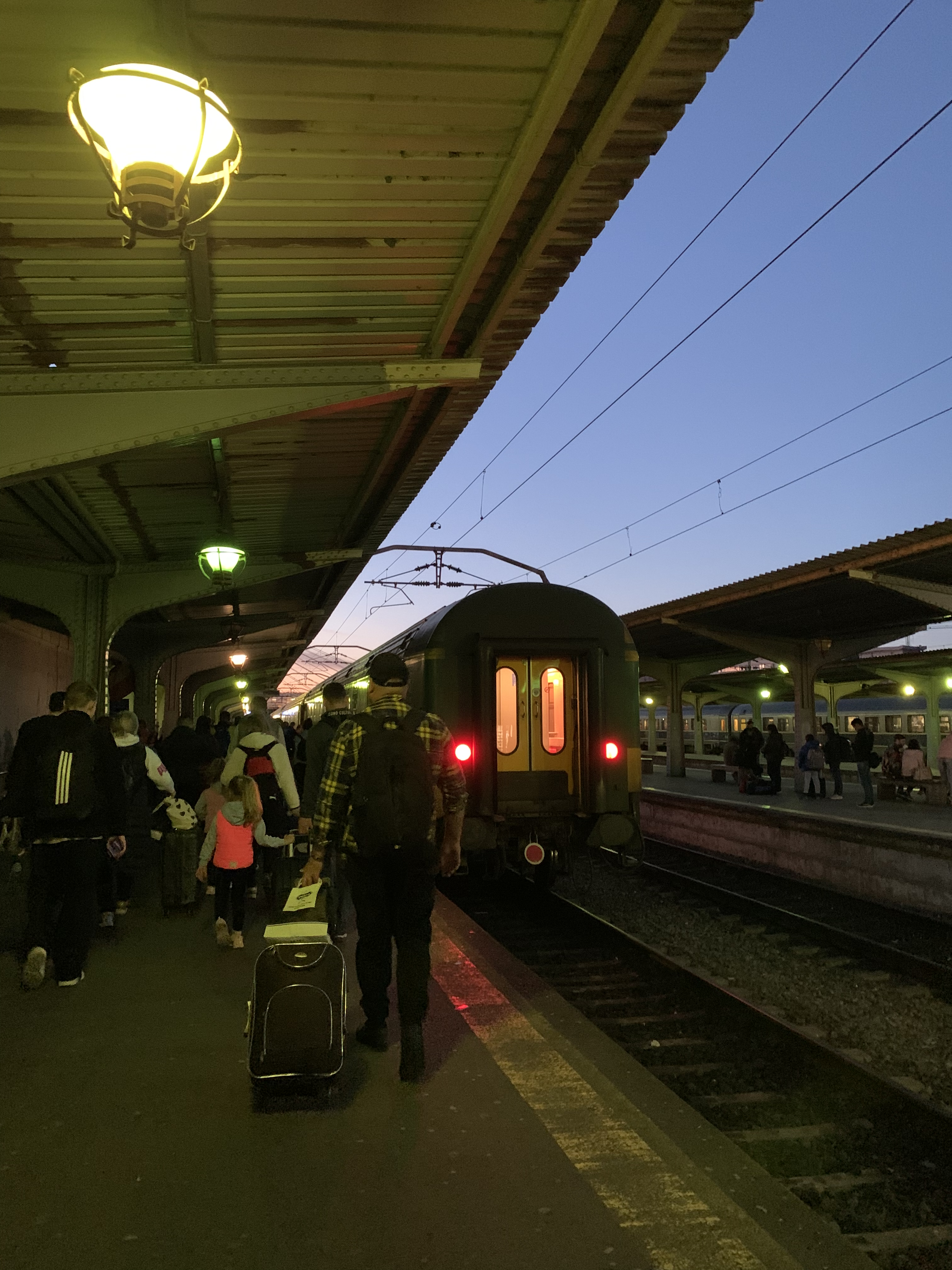
An Astra Trans Carpatic train at the station and Interregional coradia services to Brasov and Constanta,regio călători services to Iași and Brasov and seasonal services to Mangalia and Constanta

== See also ==
- List of railway stations in Romania
- Bucharest Metro
