= 1 Mai metro station =

Bucharest metro station

Coordinates: 44°28′16.35″N 26°3′2″E

M4 1 Mai
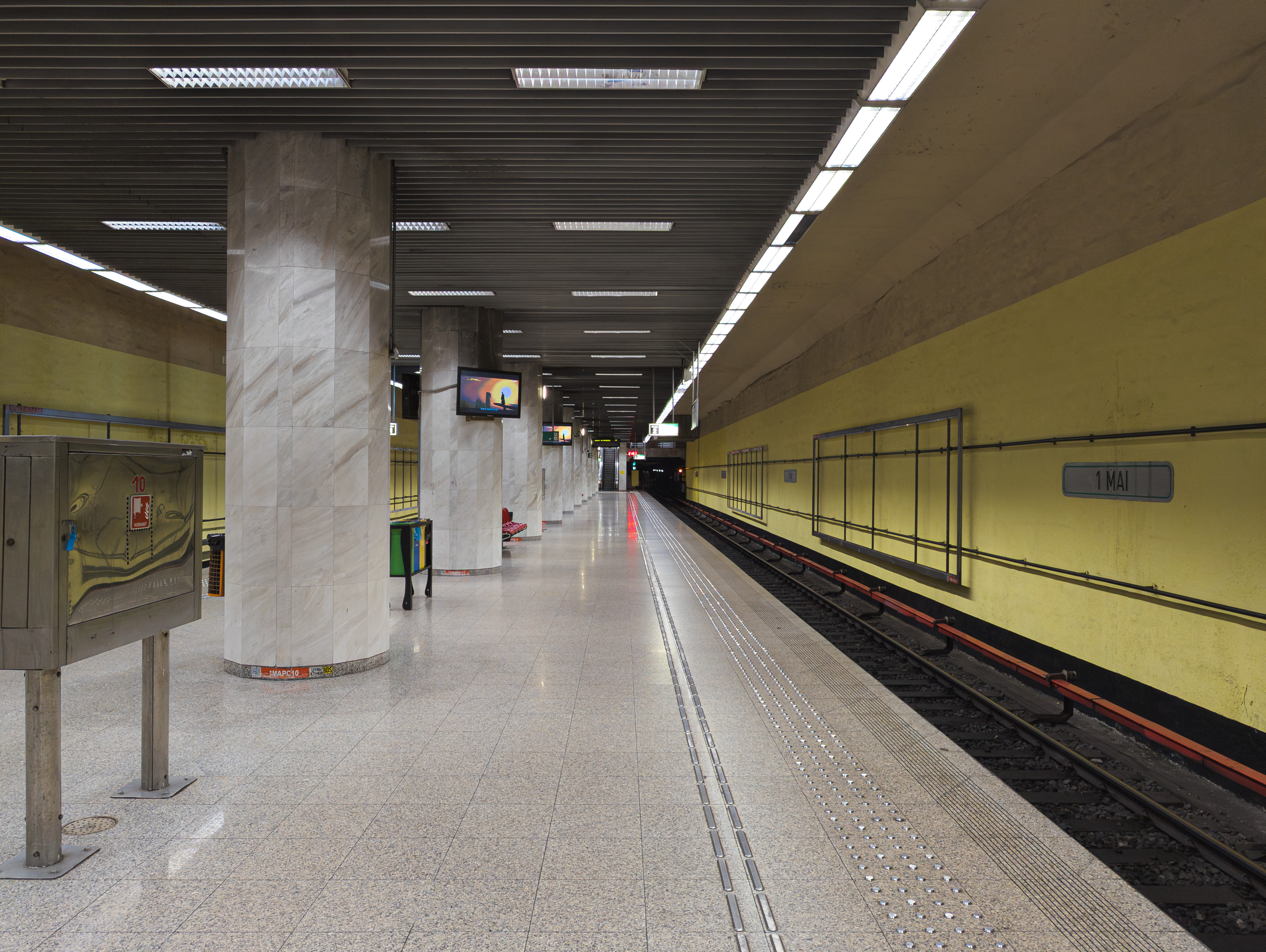
- Metro station in 2023

General information
- Location: Clăbucet square Sector 1, Bucharest; Romania
- System: Underground Metro station
- Platforms: One island platform
- Tracks: 2
- Tram routes: 42
- Bus routes: 86, 93, 97, 381, 686.

Construction
- Structure type: Underground
- Accessible: Yes

History
- Opened: 1 March 2000

Services
Preceding station	Bucharest Metro	Following station
Jiului towards Străulești	Line M4	Grivița towards Gara de Nord
Location

1 Mai (1st of May in Romanian) is a metro station in northern Bucharest, serving line M4. It is situated in Chibrit or Clăbucet Square, at the intersection of Calea Griviței, Ion Mihalache Boulevard, and Bucureștii Noi Road. It will also be serving the M6 line to the airport at Otopeni, which is currently under construction.

== History ==
The works on line 4, which 1 Mai station is part of, started in December 1989 but were stopped because of budgetary deficiencies in 1994. In the following period the only operations that took place were of evacuating water accumulated from seepage from the unfinished walls, which were subsequently stopped in order to prevent the deformation of the tunnels.

In 1997 a loan was obtained from the European Investment Bank for co-financing the "Modernizarea metroului din București – etapa I" project which restarted the works. The station was opened on 1 March 2000 together with the initial section of line 4: Gara de Nord II – 1 Mai. The station has suffered modifications over the years.

=== Line M6 ===
Line M6 will be a new metro line in Bucharest that will connect Gara de Nord and Bucharest Henri Coandă International Airport. M6 is expected to have 12 stations, the first of which to be 1 Mai.

The deadline until the Line M6 was supposed to be functional was 2021. The construction work on the line only started in December 2023.

== Architecture ==
The station was built in the typical Gara de Nord - 1 Mai segment architecture, with a central platform and a unified grey-blue colour scheme.

Initially, the station had a grey-blue colour scheme where the lighter floor and central pillars contrasted with the darker side walls. The floor and pillars are made out of grey and white granite respectively, the ceiling is linear, made of aluminium, the railings are made of aluminium as well while the walls are synthetic and were painted blue. Compared to the other stations of the segment, 1 Mai station is considerably taller.

Several years after the station's opening, the walls were painted in a yellow and dark blue model, without any apparent connection to the already existing architecture. The walls got deteriorated in time because of seepage. In March 2023, the walls were repainted in yellow (although a different shade) and dark blue, but no measure was taken to stop future seepage.

Tactile paving was mounted towards the end of 2022 for visually impaired people.

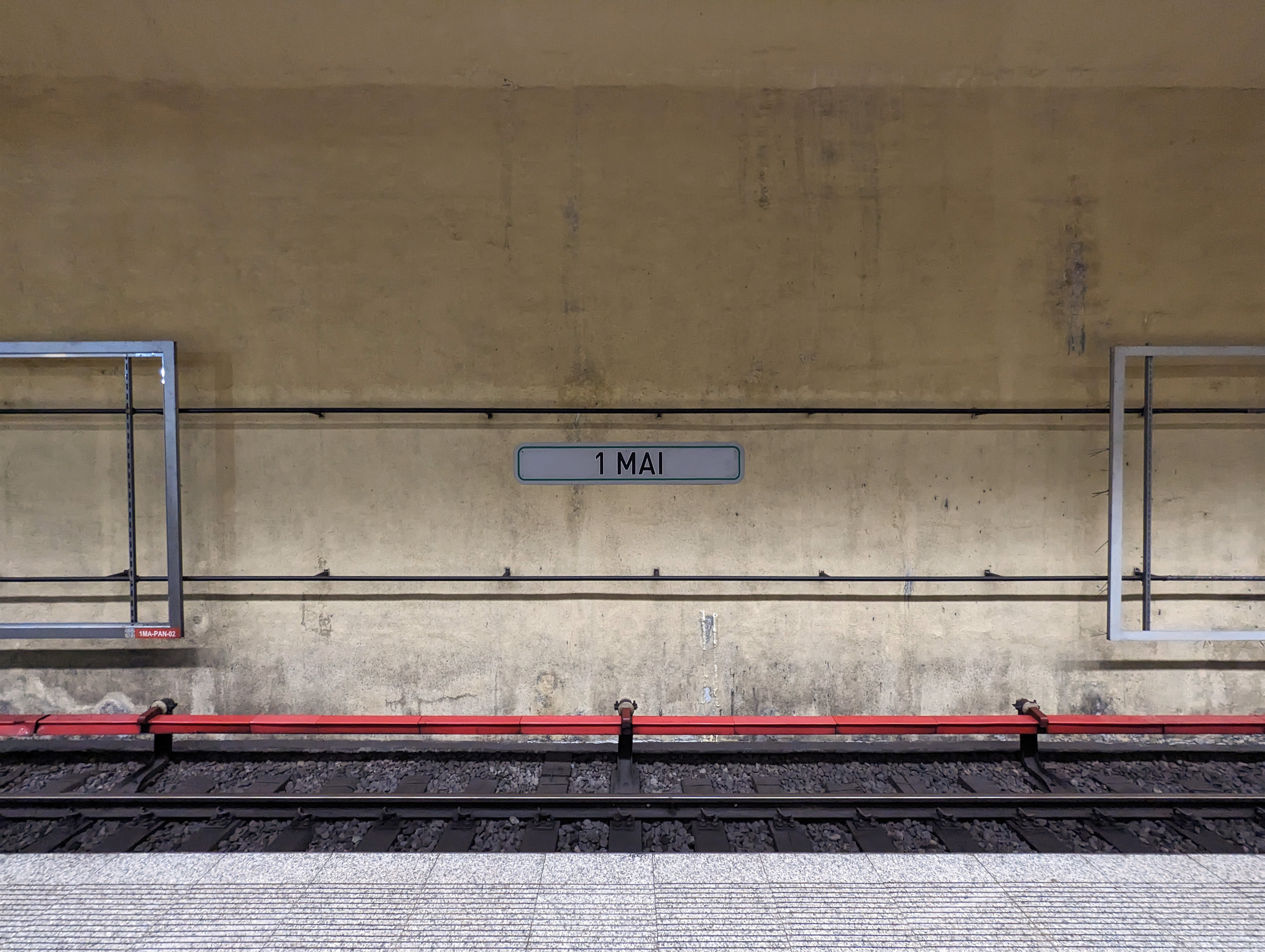
1 Mai station in March 2023

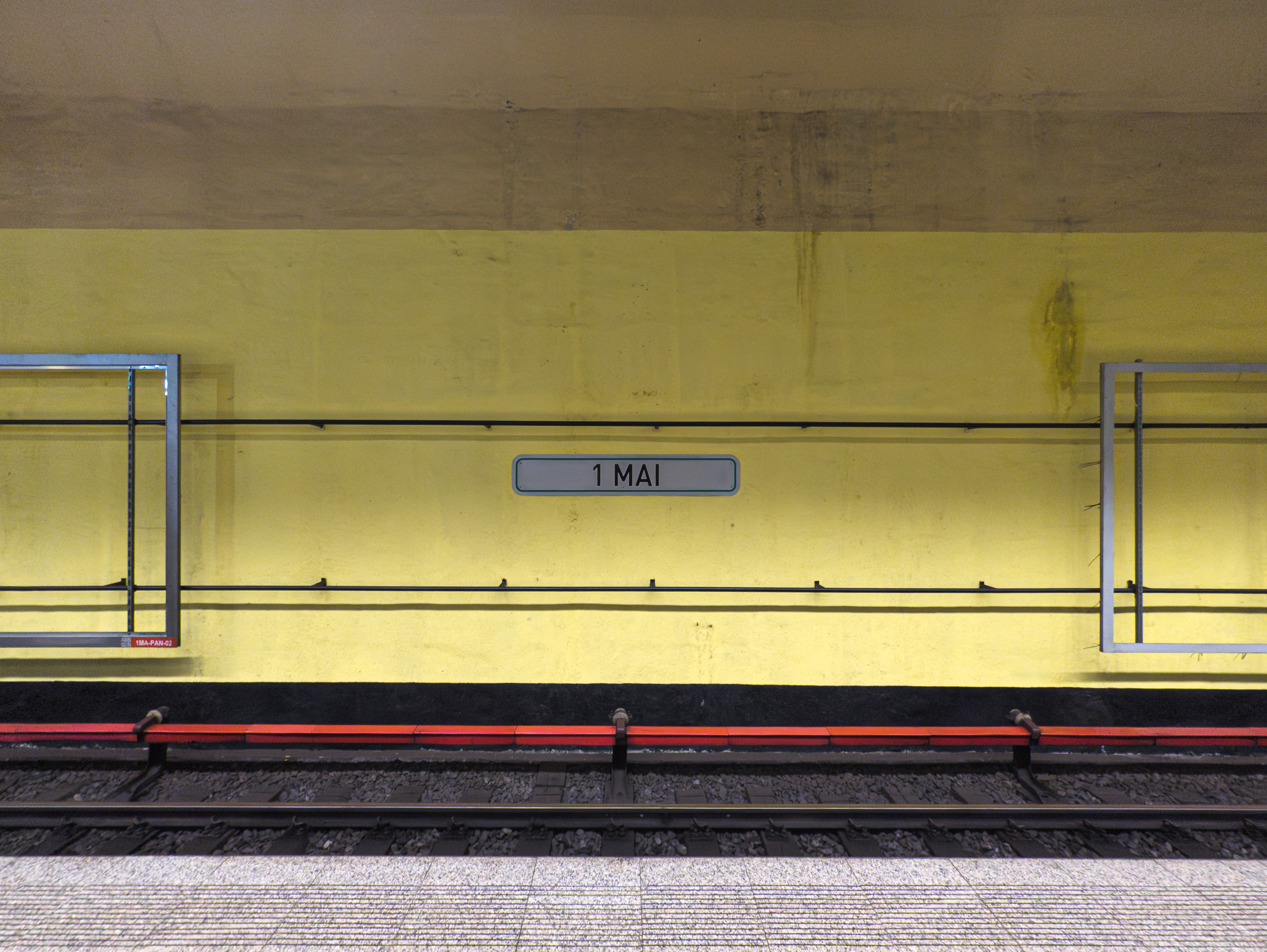
1 Mai station in August 2023
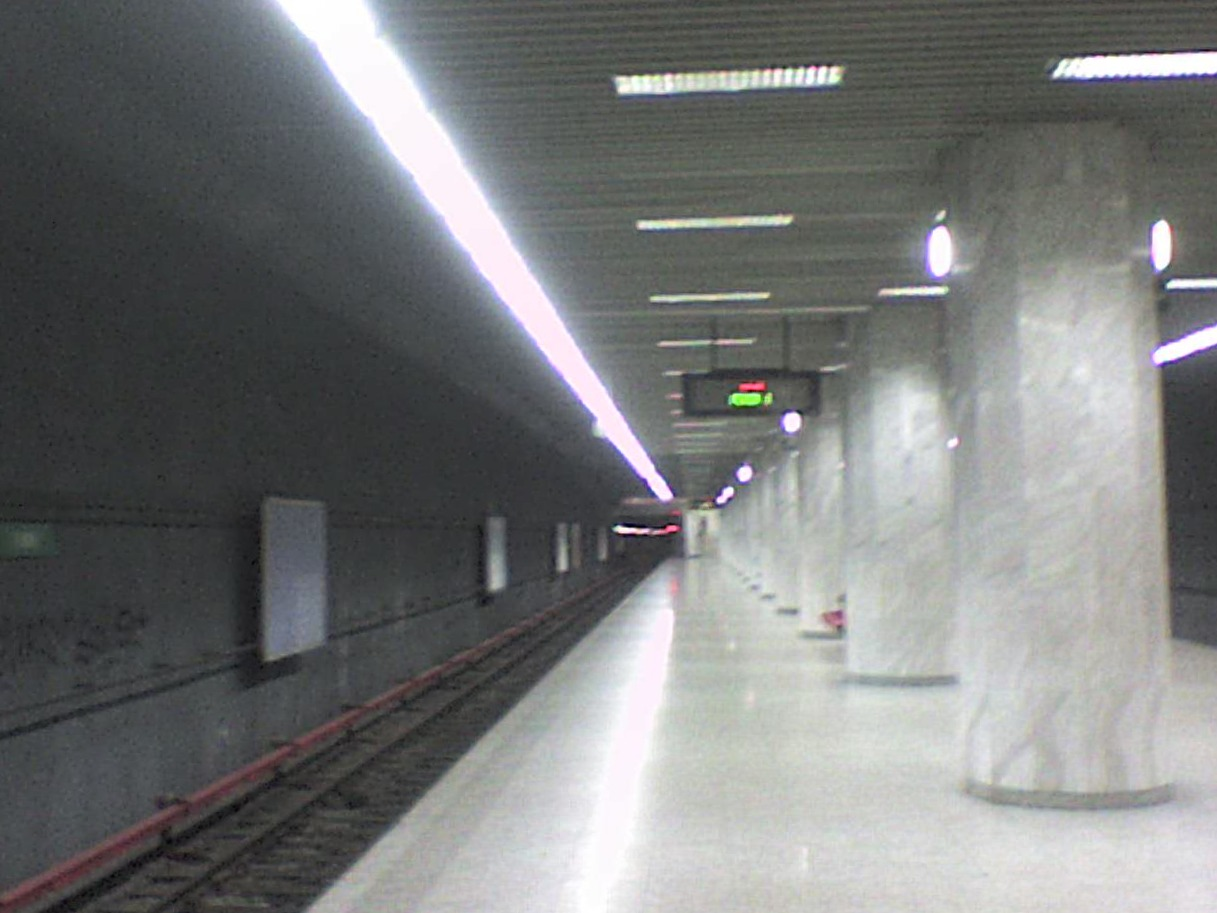
1 Mai station in 2007, original architecture

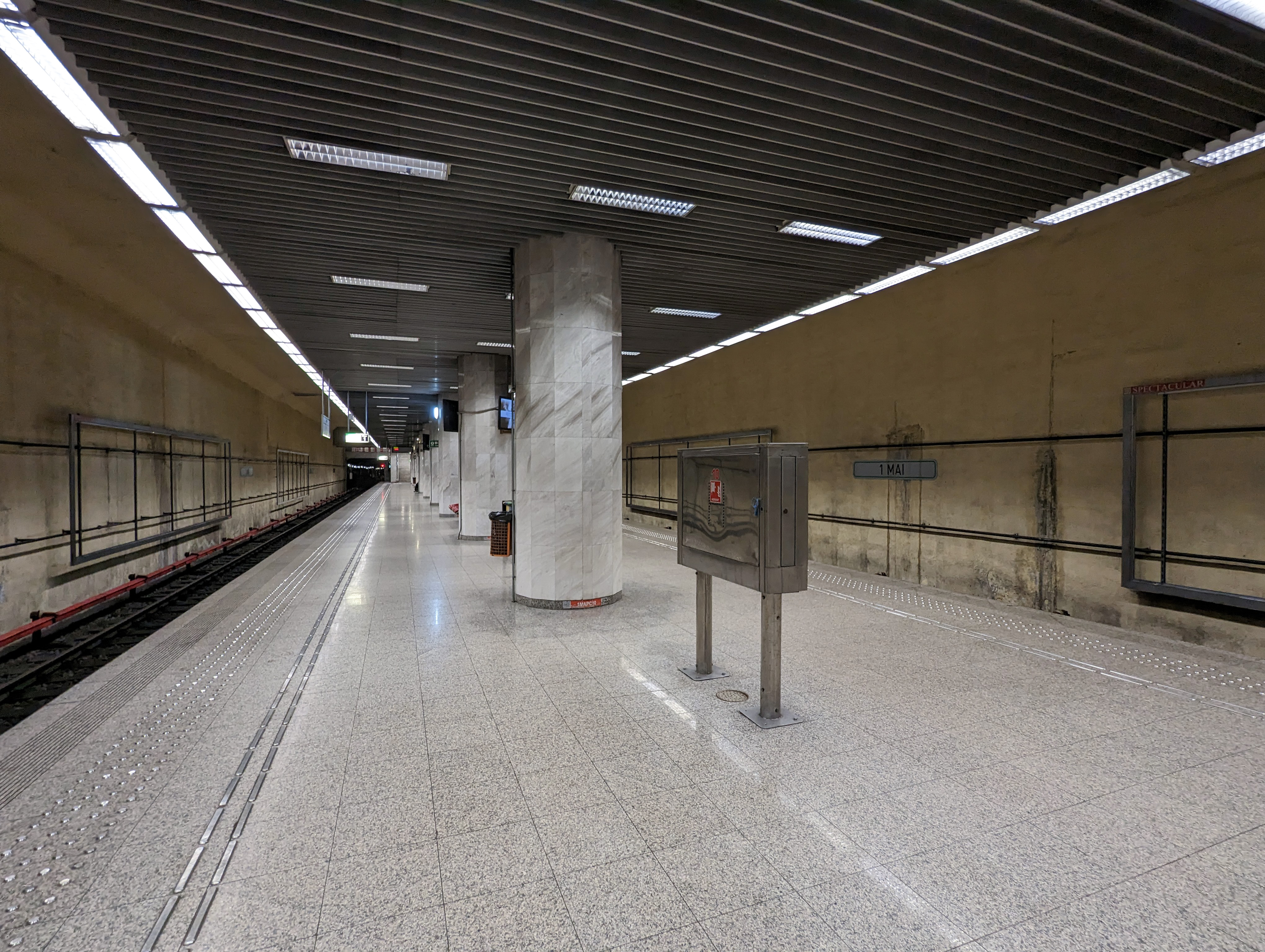
1 Mai station in March 2023

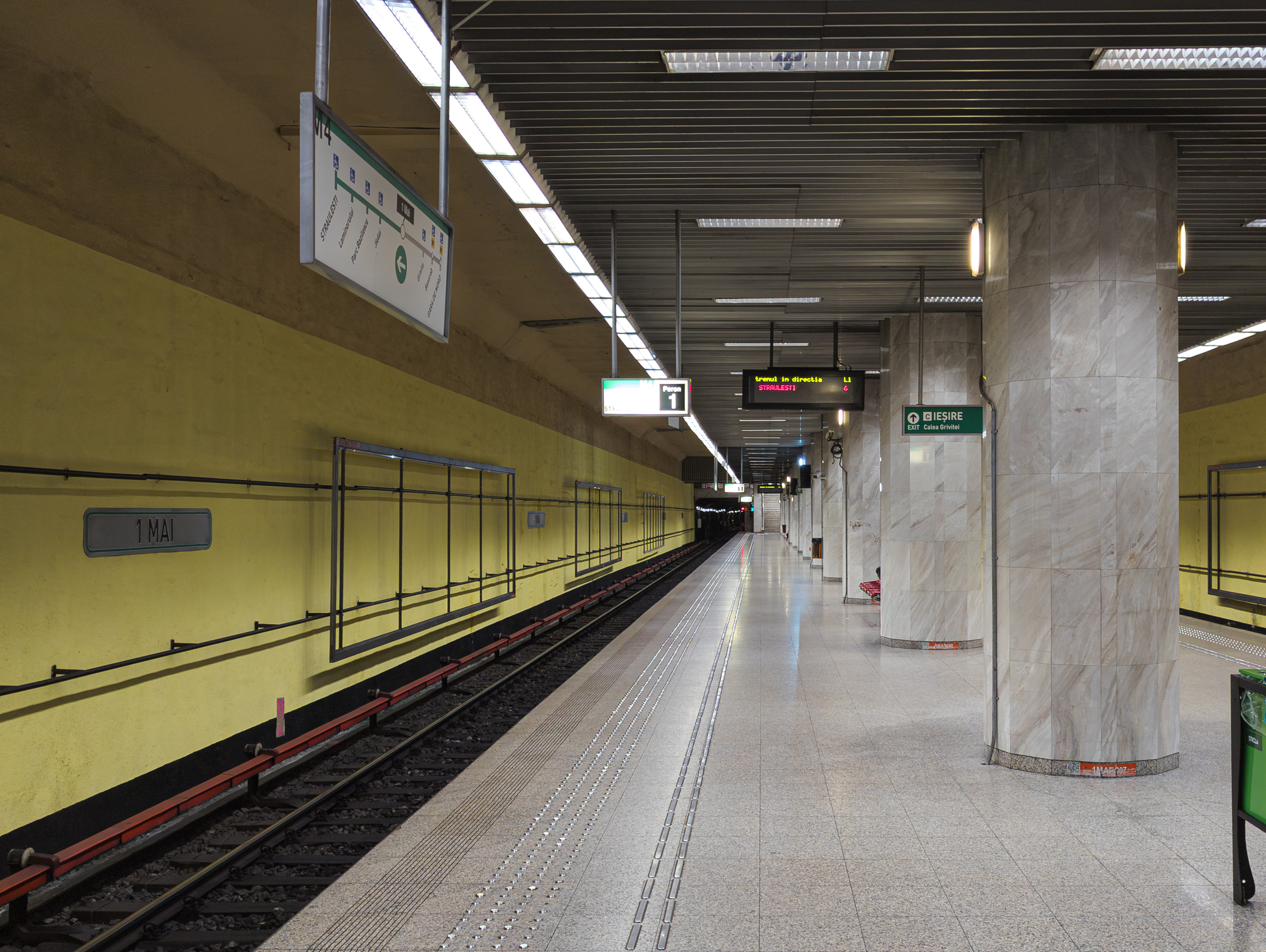
1 Mai station in August 2023

== Name ==
The name of the station was chosen based on the former name of Ion Mihalache Boulevard – 1 Mai Boulevard. This has proven controversial – firstly, because most inhabitants associate "1 Mai" with the 1 Mai Market located almost 3 km (1.9 mi) away from the metro station, and secondly because the name 1 Mai Avenue had been already given to another street in Western Bucharest when the subway station opened. Incidentally, that avenue may also host a metro station in the future.
