= Străulești metro station =

Bucharest metro station

Coordinates: 44.4879°N 26.0369°E

M4 Străulești
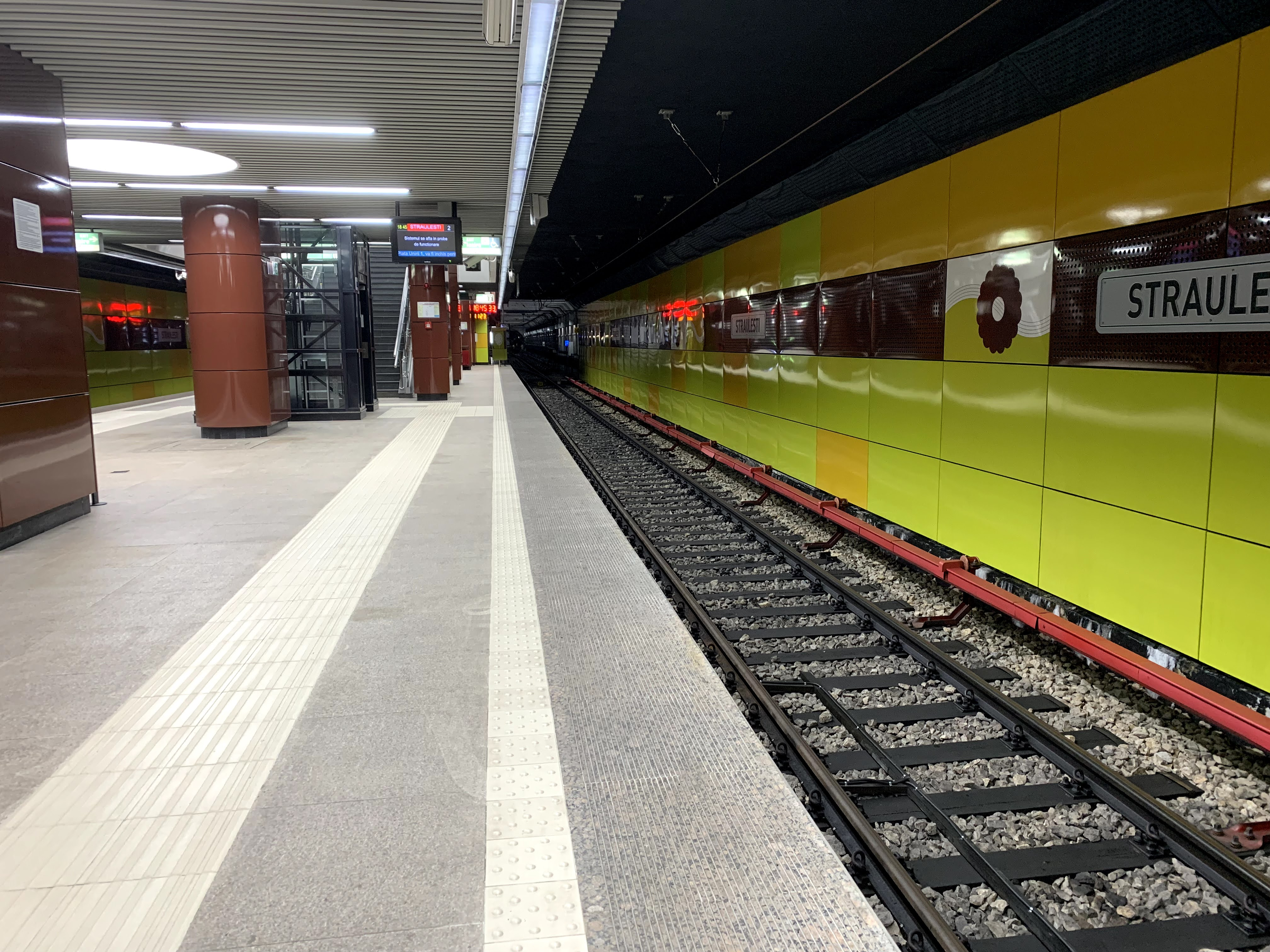

General information
- Location: Bucureștii Noi Avenue; Sector 1, Bucharest; Romania
- Platforms: One island platform
- Tracks: 2
- Bus routes: 95, 205, 304, 436, 476.

Construction
- Structure type: Underground

History
- Opened: 31 March 2017

Services
Preceding station	Bucharest Metro	Following station
Terminus	Line M4	Laminorului towards Gara de Nord
Location

Străulești is a metro station in northern Bucharest, serving Bucharest Metro Line M4. It is the northern terminus of the line. Although it was supposed to be opened on 19 December 2016, as part of Stage III of M4 line, Metrorex decide it to postpone it until the first half of 2017 due to safety issues. The station was opened on 31 March 2017 as part of the extension of the line from Parc Bazilescu. It is located near the north-western exit of Bucharest towards Mogoșoaia and includes a new metro depot and a park & ride. Its main purpose is to encourage the people working in Bucharest to park their cars at the entrance of the city and continue their ride with the public transport.There is also a museum of Metrorex with figurines of the Bombardier and Caf trains.
