= Bucharest Metro Line M4 =

Metro line in Bucharest, Romania

Line M4

Overview
- Status: Operational
- Termini: Străulești; Gara de Nord
- Stations: 8

Service
- Type: Rapid transit
- System: Bucharest Metro
- Operator(s): Metrorex S.A.
- Depot(s): Străulești
- Rolling stock: BM1 (Astra IVA); BM2 (Bombardier)
- Ridership: 26949000 (2019)

History
- Opened: 2000
- Last extension: 2017

Technical
- Line length: 7.44 km (4.62 mi)
- Track gauge: 1,432 mm (4 ft 8 3/8 in)
- Electrification: 750 V DC third rail

M4 is one of the five lines of the Bucharest Metro. It is currently 7.44 km (4.6 mi) long and runs from Gara de Nord to Străulești, following the Griviței and Bucureștii Noi avenues.

== History ==
Construction of the line started in September 1989, shortly before the Romanian Revolution. The tunnels were built up to where Parc Bazilescu is today. Construction was abandoned afterwards and was resumed later on in the 90's. The first section of the M4 opened on 1 March 2000 from Gara de Nord to 1 Mai. After many years of delays the next section to Parc Bazilescu was finally opened on 1 July 2011. Parc Bazilescu was not in the initial plan and was only built to open the section quicker.

In 2013, construction started on the final 1.6 km (1.0 mi) section of the M4 to Străulești, along with Străulești depot. On 3 September 2015 tunneling work was completed. The service was extended with two more stations, Laminorului and Străulești, which opened on 31 March 2017.

== Rolling stock ==
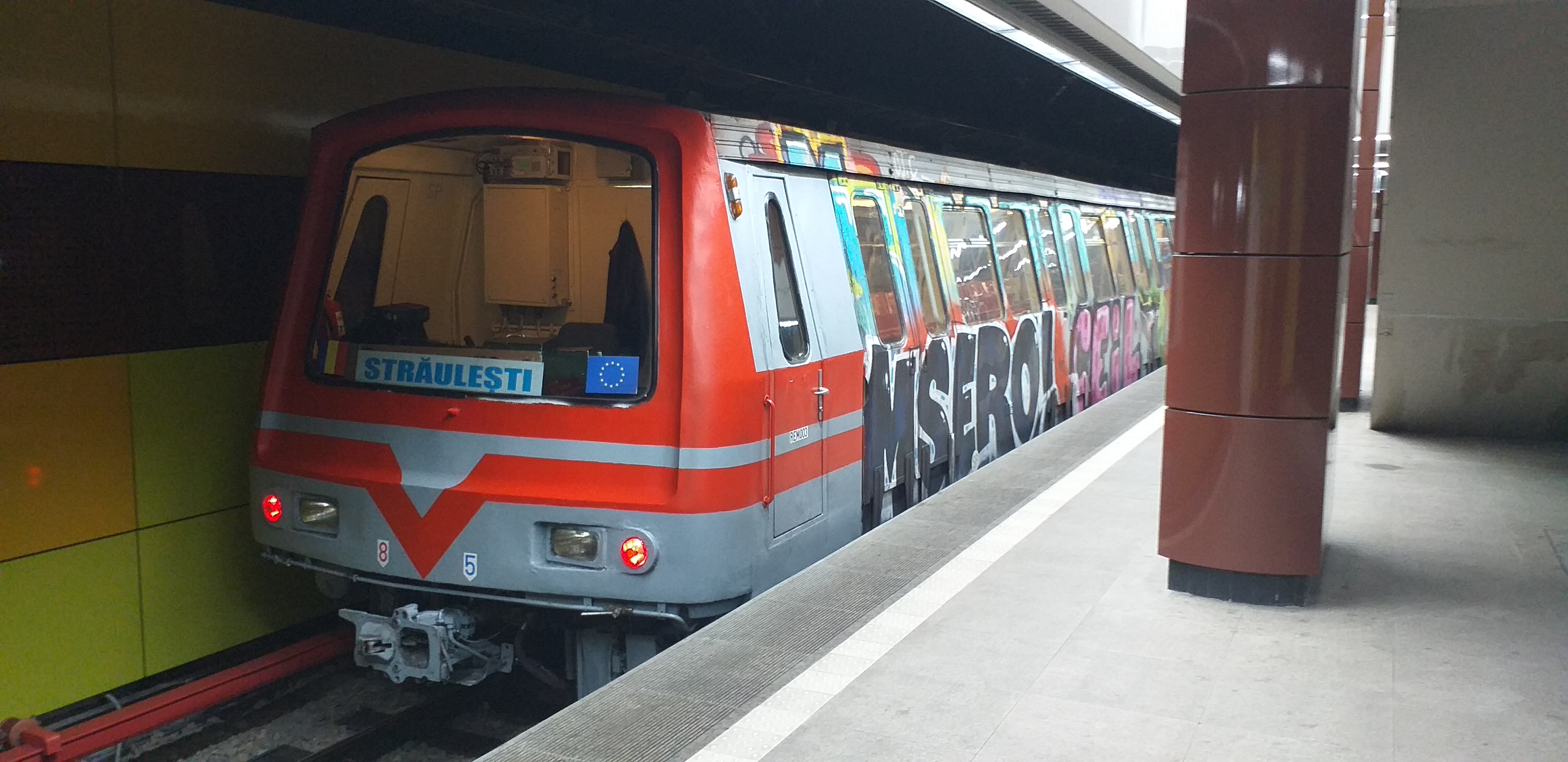
Astra IVA train at Străulești metro station

Despite being one of the newest lines on the network, the M4 runs old Astra IVA trains.

The Astra IVA trains will soon be retired from the Bucharest Metro and replaced with Alstom Metropolis trains.

== Planned extension ==
In 2022, the Southern extension from Gara de Nord to Gara Progresul was approved. The tender for this extension was launched on 26 April 2024. The plans are for M4 to be extended with 14 new stations.
