= Gara de Nord metro station =

Metro station in Bucharest, Romania

M1 M4 Gara de Nord
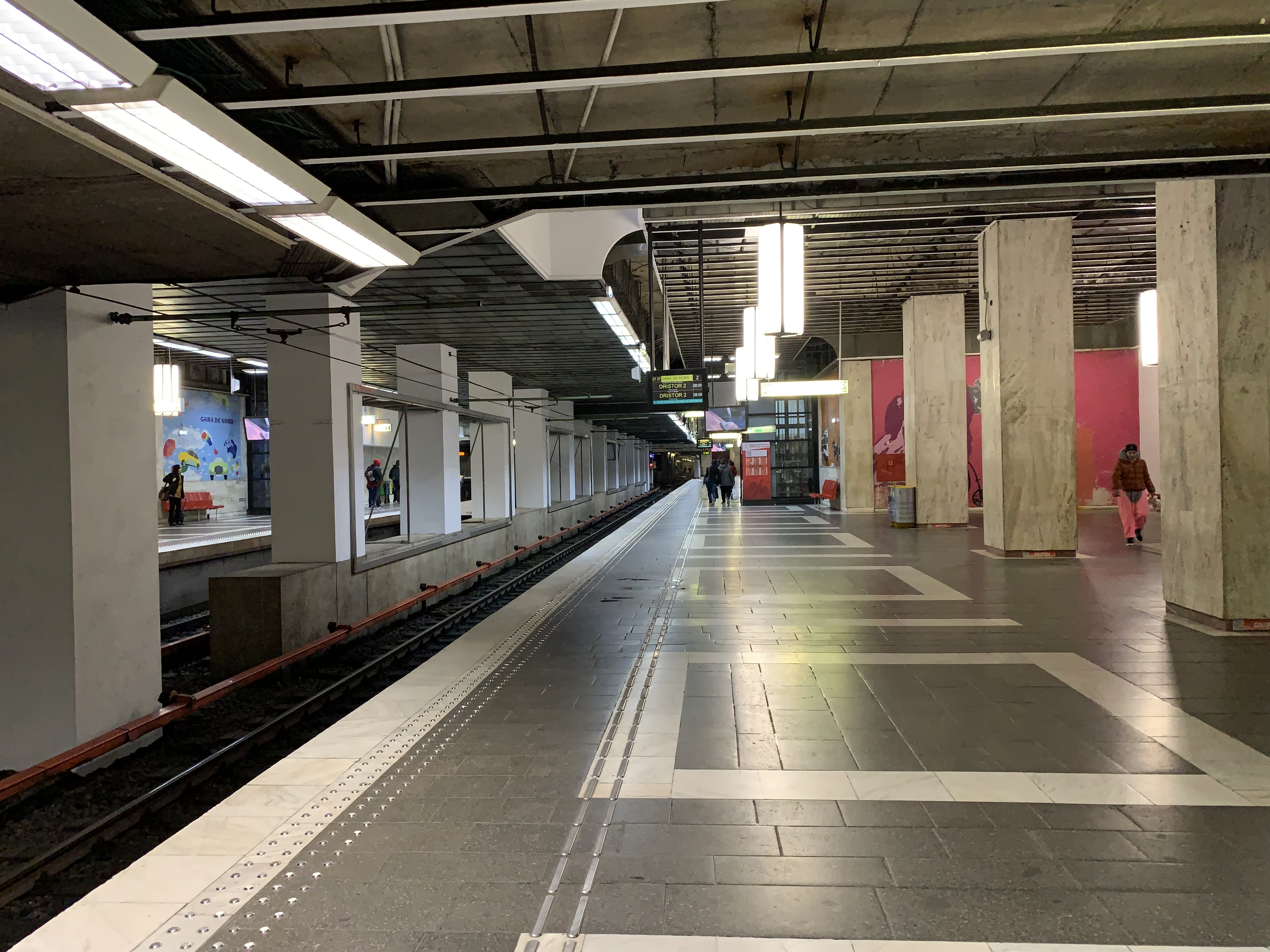
- A platform of the station in 2023

General information
- Location: Gara de Nord Train Station; Sector 1, Bucharest; Romania
- Coordinates: 44°26′50″N 26°04′35″E
- Platforms: 2 side platforms (M1); 1 island platform (M4)
- Tracks: 4
- Tram routes: 44
- Bus routes: 62, 79, 85, 86, 93, 96, 97, 104, 105, 117, 123, 178, 182, 282.

Construction
- Structure type: Underground

History
- Opened: 24 December 1987 (M1); 1 March 2000 (M4)

Services
Preceding station	Bucharest Metro	Following station
Basarab towards Republica	Line M1	Piata Victoriei towards Dristor 2
Basarab towards Străulești	Line M4	Terminus
Location

Gara de Nord is the name of two separate metro stations, situated near Gara de Nord train station in Bucharest and serving lines M1 and M4. Neither of the metro stations nor the railway station are interconnected, passengers being required to use the next station (Basarab) to switch from M1 to M4 directly, without having to validate a ticket.

The first station was opened on 24 December 1987 as the eastern terminus on an extension from Crângași. On 17 August 1989, the extension to Dristor was opened. The M4 station was opened on 1 March 2000 as part of the inaugural section of the line from Gara de Nord to 1 Mai.

It is very unusual mainly due to its story: Initially designed as a bilevel station, the layout of it was heavily changed, leading into a one-year delay until its opening (this involved abandoning its bilevel plan and inserting a tight turn going towards Piața Victoriei). One can notice the structures made for the bi-level tunnel, in the tunnel towards Basarab. The second station began construction during 1989, but the construction work froze due to the economic downturn following the revolution in the same year. Construction on line M4 resumed in 1996, by removing the water filled in the tunnels, and it was opened in 2000. Owing to this current configuration, passengers have to exit the system and enter again, despite there being a sort of connection tunnel between the stations.

A widely circulated urban story tells how supposedly the upper deck of one of the bilevel tunnels served as a siding, where trains could be left overnight in case there was no capacity in other places. Supposedly, one Astra IVA set was left in the upper deck but the tracks leading to the sidings were destroyed by construction work, and was left there abandoned, in its place, another set with the identical numbers was delivered. The story further claims that the set was eventually found in working order after 1989, but since it could not be removed, it was left there and thieves, years later, broke into the tunnels and dismantled parts from the unit.
