= Sector 1 (Bucharest) =

Bucharest, Sector 1 Sector 1, București
- Sector
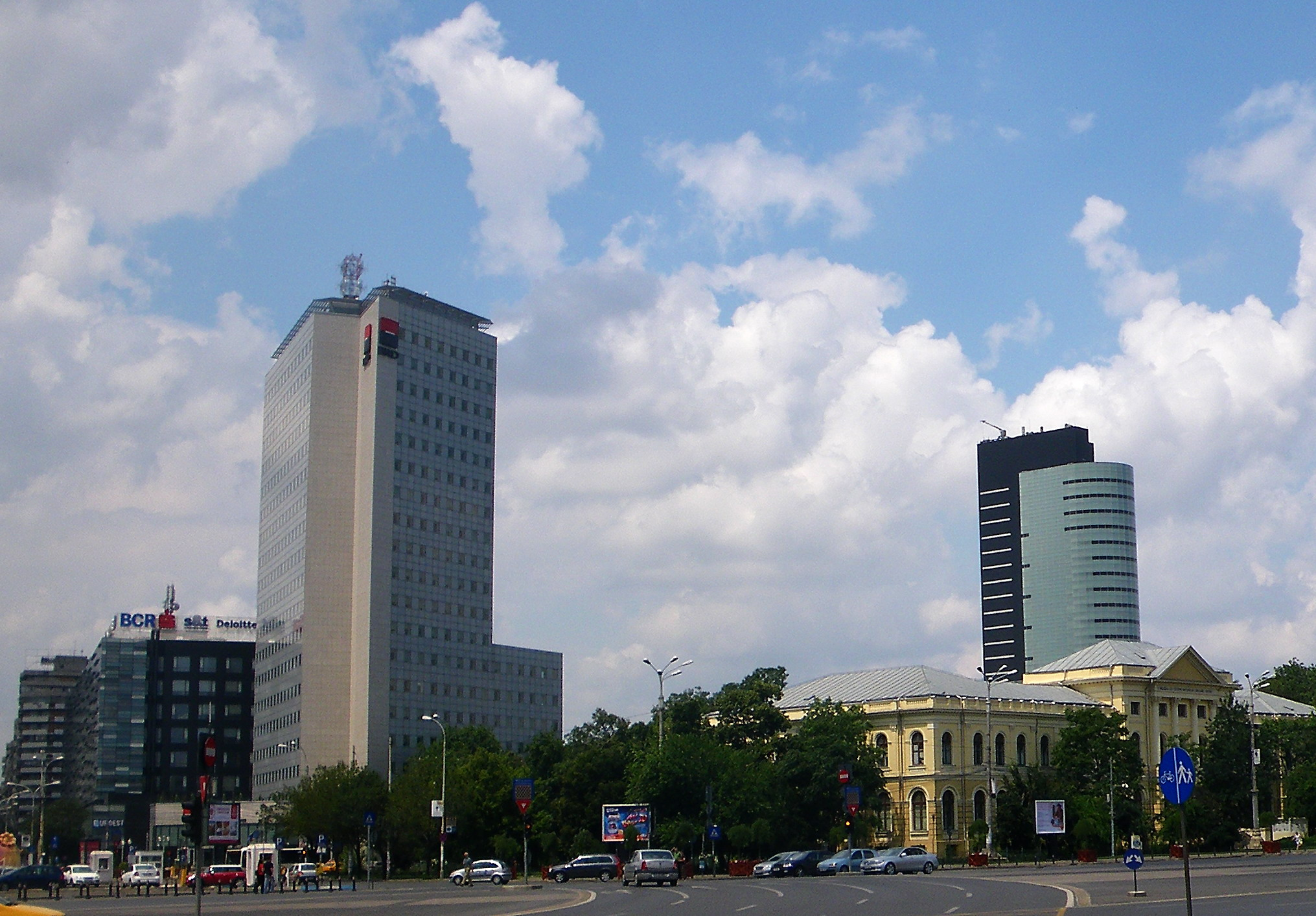
- Piața Victoriei
- Interactive map of Bucharest, Sector 1
- Coordinates: 44°27′14″N 26°04′26.2″E
- Country: Romania
- County: Municipality of Bucharest

Government
  - Mayor: George Tuță (PNL)
  - Deputy-mayor: Olivier Păiuși (USR) Ramona Porumb (PNL)

Area
  - Total: 70 km^{2} (27 sq mi)
- Elevation: 60–90 m (200–300 ft)

Population (December 1, 2021)
  - Total: 224,764
  - Density: 3,210.9/km^{2} (8,316/sq mi)
- Time zone: UTC+2 (EET)
  - Summer (DST): UTC+3 (EEST)
- Postal Code: 01xxxx
- Area code: +40 x1
- Car Plates: B
- Website: www.primariasector1.ro

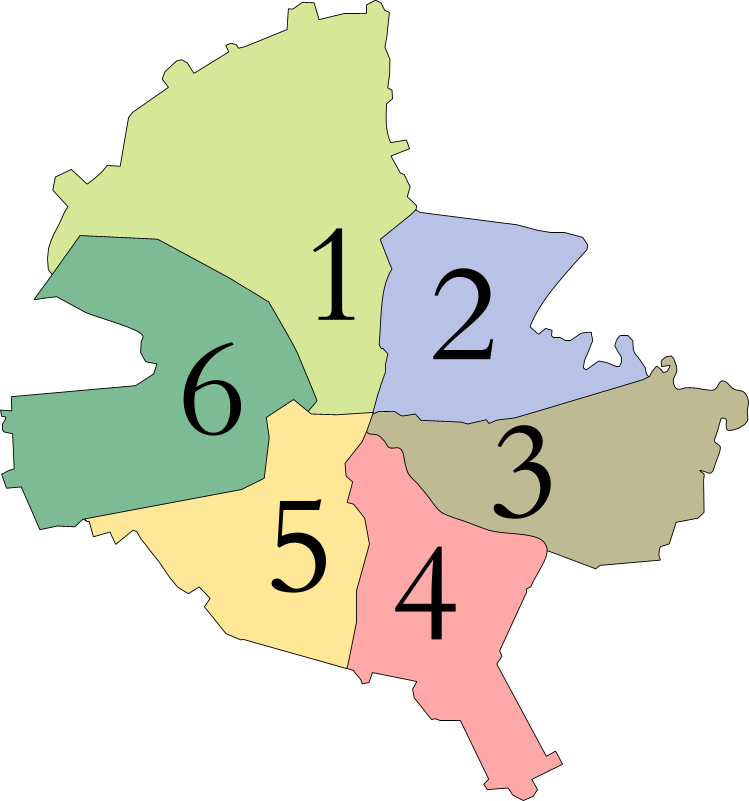
The six sectors of Bucharest

Sector 1 is an administrative unit of Bucharest located in the northern part of the city. It contains also the northwestern districts of Băneasa and Pipera. Sector 1 is thought to be the wealthiest sector in Bucharest. Like each of Bucharest sectors, there is a Local Court (Judecătoria Sectorului 1), which it submits to the Bucharest Tribunal (Tribunalul București).

== Economy ==
Blue Air, JeTran Air, Petrom, and Medallion Air have their head offices in Sector 1.

== Quarters ==
- Aviatorilor
- Aviației
- Băneasa
- Bucureștii Noi
- Dămăroaia
- Domenii
- Dorobanți
- Gara de Nord
- Grivița
- Floreasca
- Pajura
- Pipera
- Primăverii
- Romană
- Victoriei
- Străulești
- 1 Mai

== Politics ==
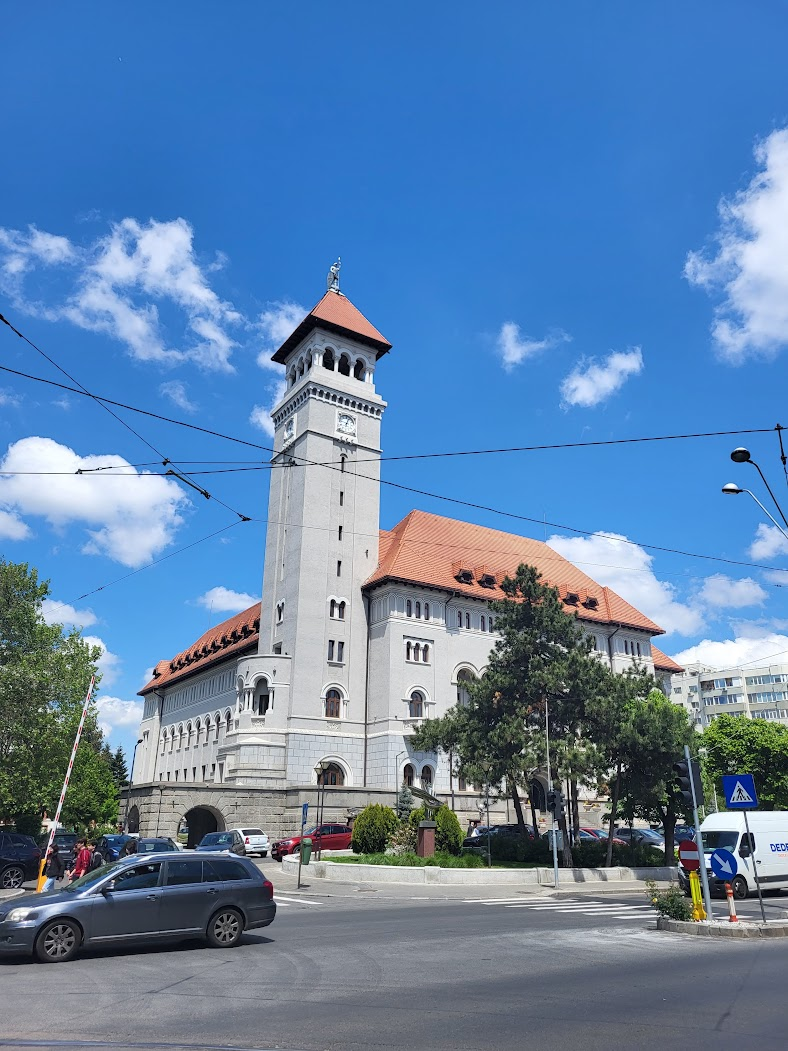
Sector 1 Town hall building

The mayor of the sector is George Tuță from the National Liberal Party (PNL). He was elected in 2024 for a four-year term. The Local Council of Sector 1 has 27 seats, with the following party composition (as of 2020):

Party	Seats	Current Council
Social Democratic Party (PSD)	9	
Save Romania Union (USR)	9	
National Liberal Party (PNL)	6	
People's Movement Party (PMP)	3	
