= Piața Sudului metro station =

Bucharest metro station

Coordinates: 44°23′35″N 26°07′21″E

M2 Piața Sudului
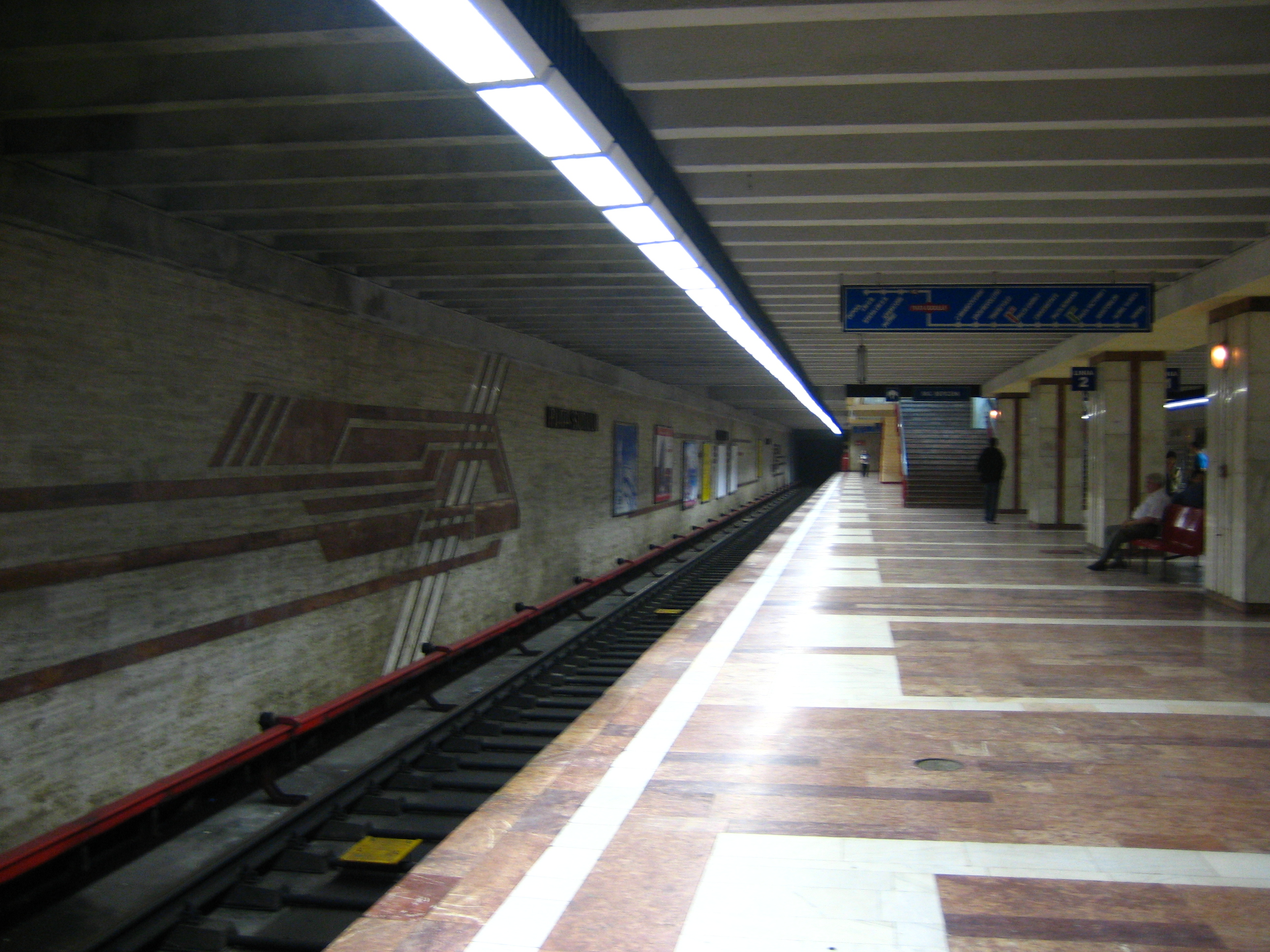

General information
- Location: Piața Sudului; Sector 4, Bucharest; Romania
- Operator: Metrorex
- Platforms: 1 island platform
- Tracks: 2
- Tram routes: 1, 10
- Bus routes: STB: 72, 73, 74, 76, 216, 232, 312, 381, N1, N10, N105, N106; STV: 439, 440, 479

Construction
- Structure type: Underground
- Accessible: Yes

History
- Opened: 24 January 1986; 40 years ago

Services
Preceding station	Bucharest Metro	Following station
Apărătorii Patriei towards Tudor Arghezi	Line M2	Constantin Brâncoveanu towards Pipera
Location

Piața Sudului (eng: Southern Square) is a metro station in located in Berceni, Bucharest. Located near the station, above ground is the 'Big Berceni' market, highway to Oltenița (Șoseaua Olteniței) and many other transport options including tram, trolleybus and bus connections, run by STB. The station is directly linked with the Shopping Mall Sun Plaza via an underground passage.

The station was opened on 24 January 1986 as part of the inaugural section of the line, from Piața Unirii to Depoul IMGB.
