= Apărătorii Patriei metro station =

Bucharest metro station

Coordinates: 44°22′46″N 26°08′08″E

M2 Apărătorii Patriei
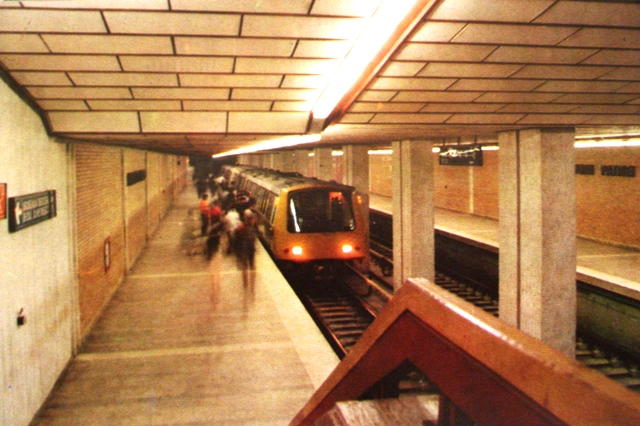
- Apărătorii Patriei in the 1980s

General information
- Location: Oltenței, Berceni; Sector 4, Bucharest; Romania
- Operator: Metrorex
- Platforms: 2 side platforms
- Tracks: 2
- Bus routes: STB: 102, 125, 232, 241, 243, N106;

Construction
- Structure type: Underground
- Accessible: Yes

History
- Opened: 24 January 1986

Services
Preceding station	Bucharest Metro	Following station
Dimitrie Leonida towards Tudor Arghezi	Line M2	Piaţa Sudului towards Pipera
Location

Apărătorii Patriei ([eng]: Defenders of the Fatherland ) is a metro station in Bucharest, designed to serve the Olteniței housing estate.

The station was opened on 24 January 1986 as part of the inaugural section of the line, from Piața Unirii to Depoul IMGB. In January 2012, construction workers who were doing foundation work at the nearby Apărătorii Patriei market accidentally discovered one of the original exits, which was part of the original plans of the station. Due to design issues with it, it was covered, and a set of new exits was built.
