= Aurel Vlaicu metro station =

Bucharest metro station

Coordinates: 44.47917°N 26.10019°E

Aurel Vlaicu
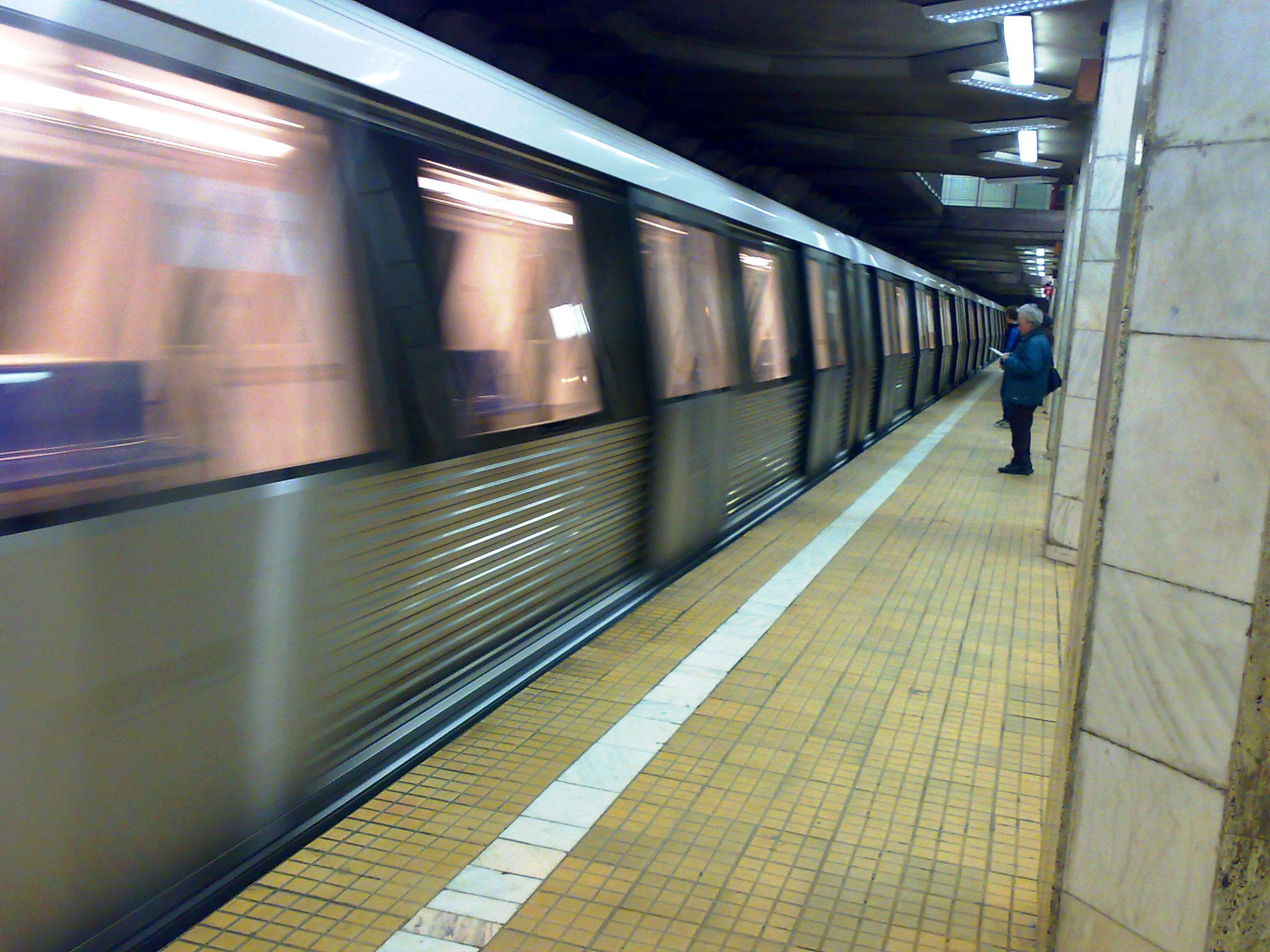

General information
- Location: Pipera / Floreasca; Sector 1, Bucharest; Romania
- Platforms: 1 island platform
- Tracks: 2
- Bus routes: 5, 112, 135, 290, 343

Construction
- Structure type: Underground

History
- Opened: 24 October 1987

Services
Preceding station	Bucharest Metro	Following station
Aviatorilor towards Tudor Arghezi	Line M2	Pipera Terminus
Location

Aurel Vlaicu is a metro station in the north of Bucharest, named after the Romanian aeroplane constructor and pioneer aviator, Aurel Vlaicu. It lies on the western end of the Pipera industrial platform, close to an intersection of three boulevards.

The station was opened on 24 October 1987 as part of the extension from Piața Unirii to Pipera. There are plans to add a permanent exhibition to the platform, in hommage to the life of Romanian aviation pioneer Aurel Vlaicu.
