= Aviatorilor metro station =

Bucharest metro station

Coordinates: 44.46725°N 26.08640°E

Aviatorilor
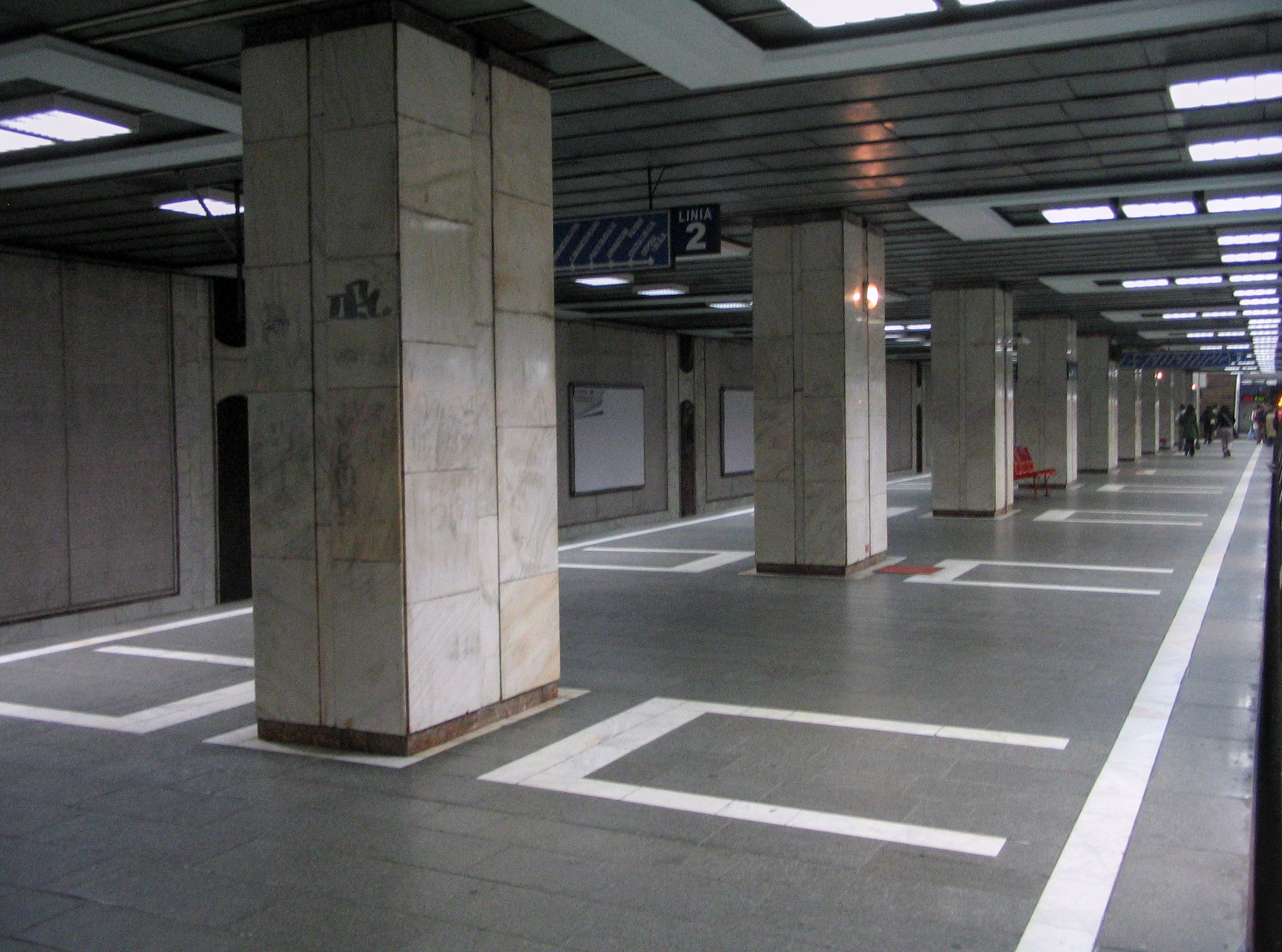

General information
- Location: Charles de Gaulle Square; Sector 1, Bucharest; Romania
- Platforms: 1 island platform
- Tracks: 2
- Bus routes: 100, 203, 205, 282, 301, 331, 331B, 335.

Construction
- Structure type: Underground

History
- Opened: 24 October 1987

Services
| Preceding station | Bucharest Metro | Following station |
|---|---|---|
| Piaţa Victoriei towards Tudor Arghezi | Line M2 | Aurel Vlaicu towards Pipera |
Location

Aviatorilor (Aviators′ in English) is a metro station in Bucharest. It is located at the end of Aviatorilor Boulevard, under Charles de Gaulle Square. It provides easy access to Herăstrău Park and the headquarters of the national television network, TVR.

The station was opened on 24 October 1987 as part of the extension from Piața Unirii to Pipera. There are plans to add a permanent exhibition to the platform, celebrating the life of Romanian World War II fighter ace Captain Horia Agarici.
