= Piața Romană metro station =

Bucharest metro station

Coordinates: 44.44569°N 26.09765°E

Piața Romană
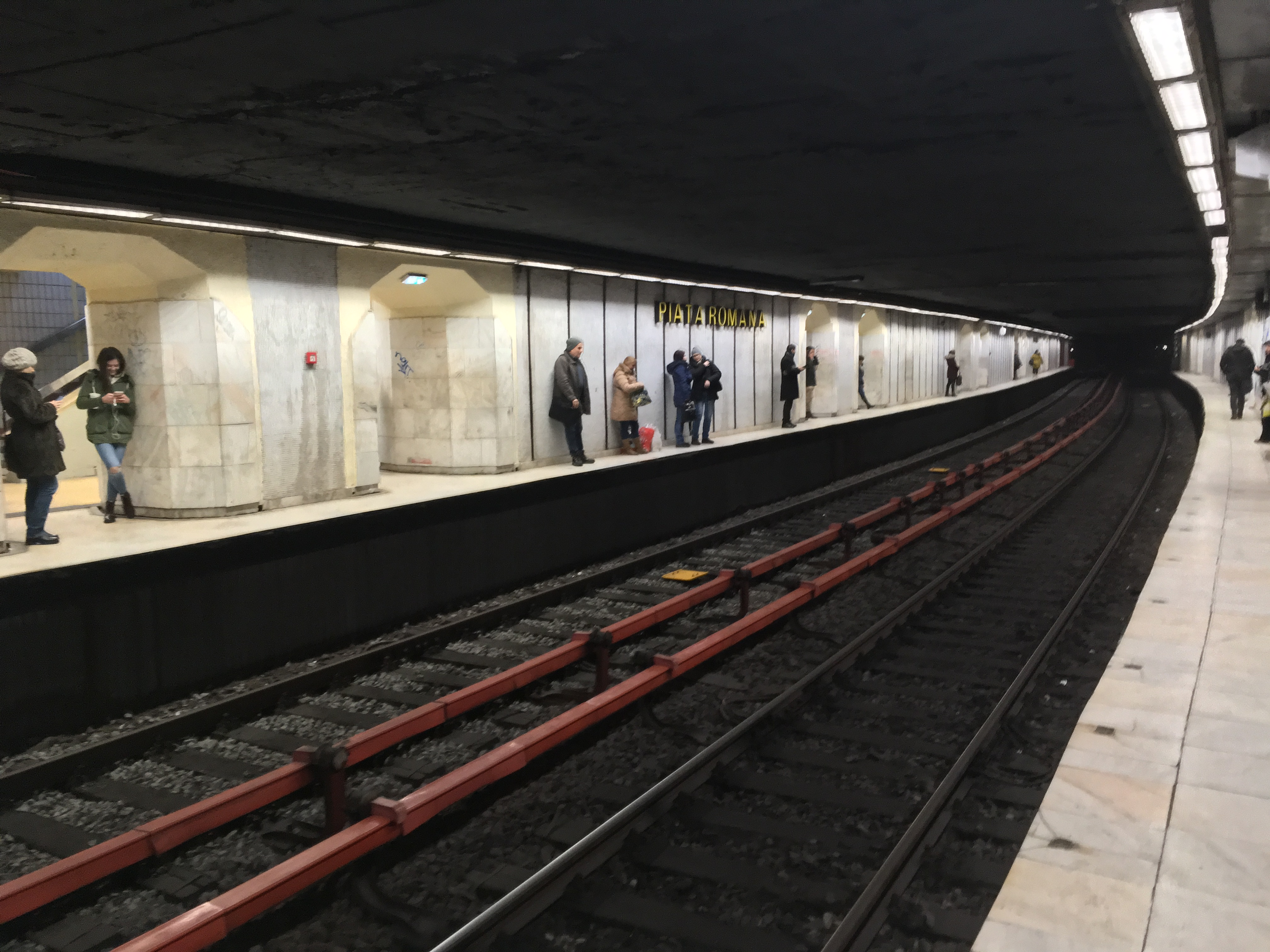
- Metro station in 2018

General information
- Location: Piața Romană; Sector 1, Bucharest; Romania
- Platforms: 2 side platforms
- Tracks: 2
- Bus routes: 79, 86, 97, 100, 168, 226, 301, 331, 331B, 368, 381.

Construction
- Structure type: Underground

History
- Opened: 28 November 1988

Services
Preceding station	Bucharest Metro	Following station
Universitate towards Tudor Arghezi	Line M2	Piața Victoriei towards Pipera
Location

Piața Romană (Romanian for "Roman Square") is a metro station in central Bucharest, located in the square with the same name, on the main north–south axis of the city centre. The entrance to the station is on Magheru Boulevard.

According to Sorin Călinescu, one of the three planners of the station, when shown the plans for the Line M2 in 1985, First Lady Elena Ceaușescu reportedly demanded the station's removal. According to some of the people who worked on the station, Ceaușescu was concerned that workers and students were starting to gain weight and needed more exercise, hence they should walk instead of taking the metro train. The engineers, having enough foresight, realized the station would be necessary in the future, and the initial construction was done in secret. Because of this, the platforms are somewhat asymmetrical, very narrow (less than 1.5 m (4 ft 11 in) wide) and the waiting area is in a corridor separated by thick walls from the platforms in order to sustain the station's structure.

While subways ran past without stopping for about a year, thousands of residents reportedly wrote to petition for a station, which was opened on 28 November 1988. It was added to the previously opened extension from Piața Unirii to Pipera.
