= Dimitrie Leonida metro station =

Bucharest metro station

Coordinates: 44°22′08″N 26°08′37″E

M2 Dimitrie Leonida
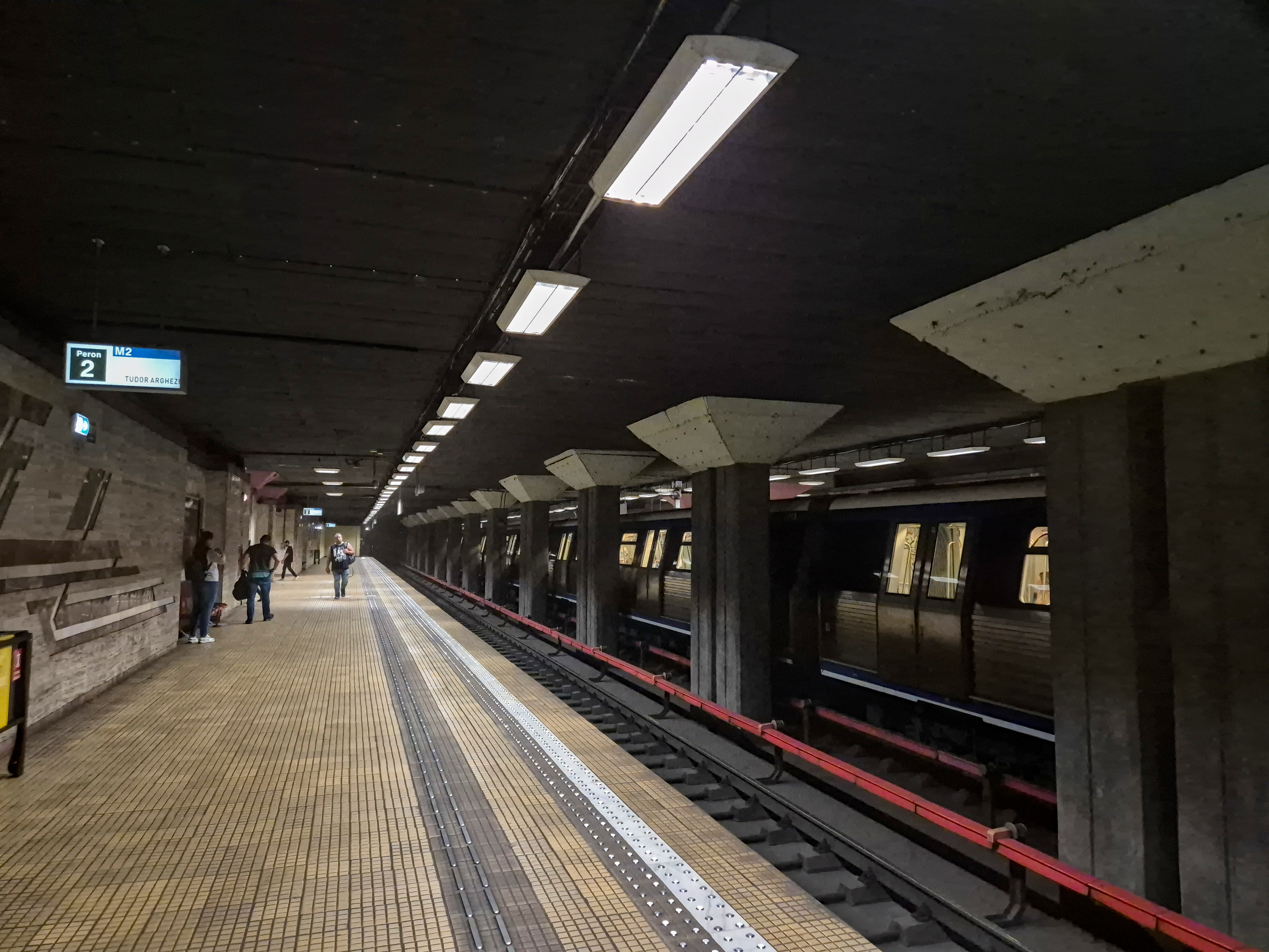
- Dimitrie Leonida station in 2025

General information
- Location: Former IMGB factory / South end of Berceni Neighborhood; Sector 4, Bucharest; Romania
- Operator: Metrorex
- Platforms: 2 side platforms
- Tracks: 2
- Bus routes: STB: 125

Construction
- Structure type: Underground
- Accessible: Yes

History
- Opened: 24 January 1986
- Former names: IMGB (1986-2009)

Services
Preceding station	Bucharest Metro	Following station
Berceni towards Tudor Arghezi	Line M2	Aparatorii Patriei towards Pipera
Location

Dimitrie Leonida, formerly known as IMGB, is a metro station in southern Bucharest, Romania, on Line 2. The station was originally built in order to transport workers to the IMGB ([ro]: Întreprinderea de Mașini Grele București; [eng]: Heavy Machinery Factory, Bucharest) steelworks. Even though this purpose is still served today to an extent, the area around the steelworks has developed residentially, and therefore is mostly used by commuters who work in the inner city. The station was opened on 24 January 1986 as part of the inaugural section of the line, from Piața Unirii to Depoul IMGB (Berceni).

The station received its current name in 2009, after the engineer Dimitrie Leonida.
