= Sun Plaza =

Sun Plaza may refer to:

- Sun Plaza (Bucharest), a shopping mall in Bucharest, Romania
- Sun Plaza, Singapore, a shopping mall in Sembawang, Singapore
- Sun Plaza, a tower in the Maslak district of Istanbul, Turkey
