= Cluj-Napoca Metro =

Underground rapid-transit system under construction in Cluj-Napoca, Romania

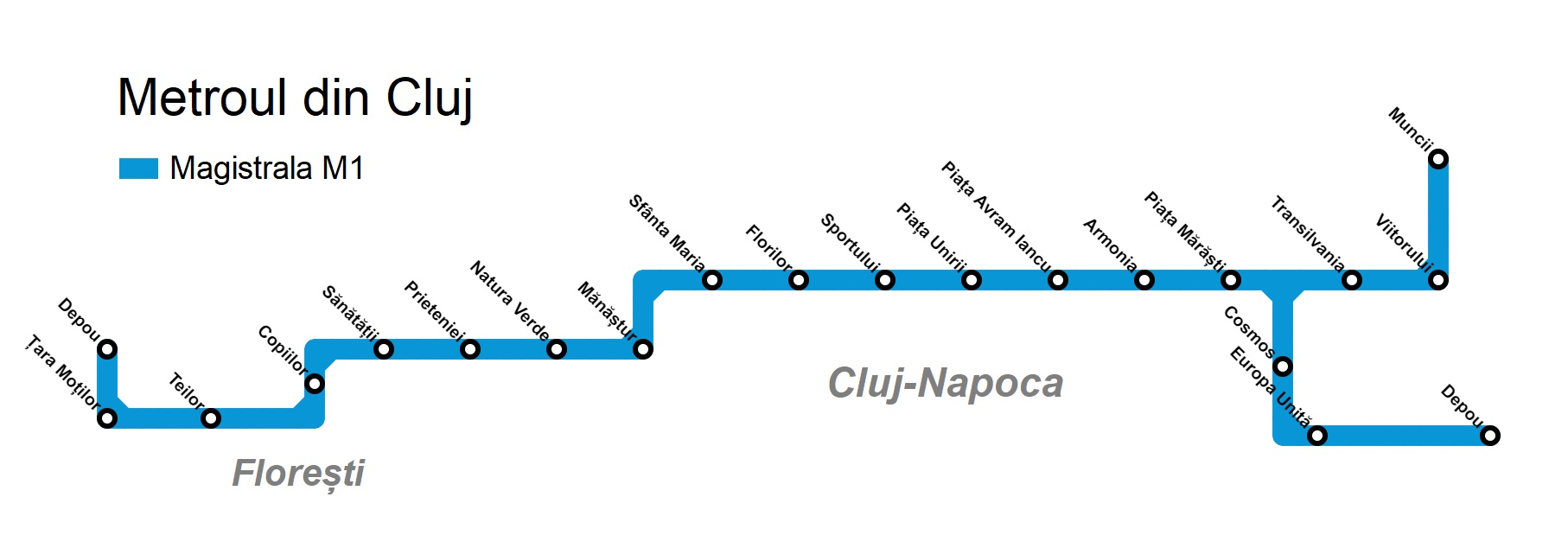
- Unofficial map of the Cluj-Napoca Metro

Overview
- Locale: Cluj-Napoca, Romania
- Transit type: Light metro
- Number of lines: 1 (under construction)
- Number of stations: 9 (first stage); 19 (when finished)

Technical
- System length: 9.16 km (5.7 mi) (first stage); 21.03 km (13.1 mi) (when finished)
- Track gauge: 1,435 mm (4 ft 8 1/2 in) standard gauge

The Cluj-Napoca Metro is a planned underground rapid-transit system under construction in Cluj-Napoca, Romania. When opened, it will become Romania's second mass transit network after the Bucharest Metro. The system is a light metro type with a transport capacity of around 15,200–21,600 passengers per hour per direction with the use of driverless trains. Construction works started in 2024 and are expected to finish by 2031. The system will be running services from Florești to Sopor and Bulevardul Muncii along Calea Moților, Bulevardul 21 Decembrie 1989 and Strada Aurel Vlaicu

== Background ==
In late 2018 studies began for a proposed Cluj-Napoca Metro, with mayor Emil Boc confirming "I hope we'll be able to launch the call for the tenders of the pre-feasibility study in the first 10 days of November. Investments higher than EUR 75 million need pre-feasibility and feasibility studies, according to the law". Boc signed contracts in April 2020 for the feasibility study of the metro along with a suburban rail network. As of December 2021, the costs of the investment are estimated at over 2 billion euros, with an estimated project implementation time of about 10 years.

In December 2022, the Ministry of Transport and Infrastructure signed the financing contract for the construction of the Cluj-Napoca Metro with a value of 13.69 billion lei. In February 2023, the design and execution works of the Line I of the Cluj metro were awarded to the association Gülermak – Alstom Transport – Arcada Company. The construction contract was signed on 25 May 2023.

== Route ==
The initial 16 km (9.9 mi) segment of the metro will follow an east-west axis from Florești situated in the western area of the city to the Aurel Vlaicu /Pod IRA area, via future regional hospital, VIVO! Cluj and Mănăștur areas, and the city centre. The complete route Florești – Piața Unirii – Piața Mărăști – Muncii / Europa Unită – Depou Sopor will have a total length of 21 km (13.0 mi) and 19 underground stations.

Works on the first stage of the project (9.16 km (5.7 mi)), between Sfânta Maria – Europa Unită (9 stations and the depot), are expected to be completed by August 2026. The next stage foresees the construction of the last two sections, Țara Moților – Sfânta Maria (7 stations) and Piața Mărăști – Muncii (3 stations), which total 11.87 km (7.4 mi).
