= Alstom Metropolis BM4 =

Class of metro train to be used in the Bucharest Metro built by Alstom

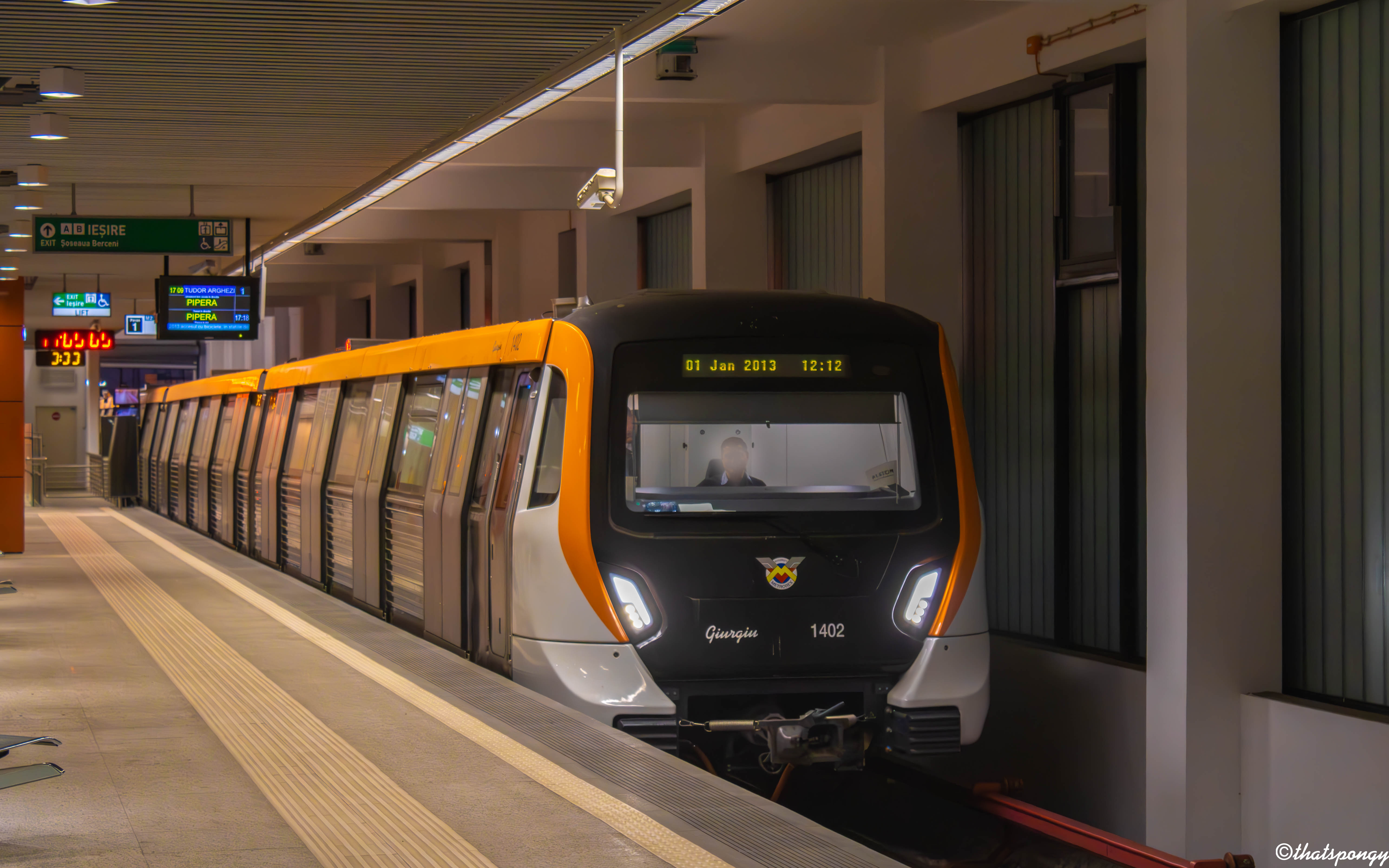
- BM4 unit 1402-2402 "Giurgiu" performing Tests at the Tudor Arghezi station.
- Stock type: Electric Metro Trainset
- In service: Starting in Q1 2026
- Manufacturer: Alstom
- Built at: Alstom Taubaté, Brazil
- Family name: Alstom Metropolis
- Constructed: 2023–2025
- Entered service: Late 2026 - Early 2027 (expected)
- Number under construction: 13 sets (+17 options)
- Number built: 13 as of September 2025
- Number in service: 0
- Formation: R1–MP1–M1–M2–MP2–R2
- Fleet numbers: 1401-2401 to 1413-2413
- Capacity: 1200 passengers, of which 216 seated (at a 4 passengers/m^{2} load)
- Operator: Metrorex
- Depot: Valea Ialomiței
- Line served: M5

Specifications
- Car body construction: Corrugated stainless steel
- Train length: 113.9 m (373 ft 8 1/4 in)
- Car length: 19 m (62 ft 4 1/16 in)
- Width: 3.1 m (10 ft 2 1/16 in)
- Doors: Four sliding doors per side/car
- Maximum speed: 80 km/h (50 mph)
- Axle load: 14 tons max.
- Traction system: Alstom OPTONIX IGBT–VVVF
- Traction motors: 16 × 4 ECA 2120 200 kW (270 hp) asynchronous 3-phase AC
- Power output: 3.2 MW (4,300 hp)
- HVAC: Separate units for passengers and drivers
- Electric systems: 750 V DC third rail
- Current collection: Contact shoe and shunting Pantograph
- UIC classification: 2′2′+Bo′Bo′+Bo′Bo′+Bo′Bo′+Bo′Bo′+2′2′
- Safety system: Alstom URBALIS 400 CBTC in Semi-automatic (GoA2+) operation
- Coupling system: Dellner non-electric coupler
- Track gauge: 1,432 mm (4 ft 8 3/8 in)

The Alstom Metropolis BM4 (Bucharest Metro 4th generation) is a family of metros designed for the Bucharest Metro, with 13 six-car trainsets currently built by Alstom at the Taubaté, Brazil plant as of 2023.

As of September 2025, 7 trains performed dynamic tests on line M5.

== History ==
The trains were ordered on November 3, 2020, after more than a year of tendering with Alstom, CAF, Hyundai Rotem, Metrowagonmash and a consortium of Astra Vagoane Călători and CRRC Qingdao Sifang being the bidders.

This order comes after the failed 2015 framework agreement order for 51 trains initially signed with CAF, which was cancelled due to corruption allegations between Metrorex and CAF during the tendering process.

The contract signed with Alstom consists in 13 trains to operate on the first phase of line M5, with an additional 17 units as an option, which are destined for the second phase of line M5 between Eroilor and Piața Iancului.

The units would be built at Alstom's plant in Taubaté, Brazil, which was expanded in November 2022 in anticipation of the contracts signed in Bucharest, Taipei, São Paulo and Santiago de Chile.

Deliveries were expected for the summer of 2022, though multiple delays were encountered by Alstom during the production of the BM4 pushing the date to April 2024, ultimately leading Metrorex to apply penalties of upwards of 20 million euros.

Alstom cited the COVID-19 pandemic and the Russian invasion of Ukraine as the main reasons of the delays due to supply chain issues caused by these events, alongside a 50 meter S-curve near the Romancierilor station instead of a 100 meter S-curve specified in the requirements, leading to Metrorex rejecting the prototype and having Alstom to redesign the car bodies. Ultimately in January 2024, Metrorex accepted the revised version of the BM4 in the form of the unit 1402-2402 "Giurgiu", giving the green light for the series production.

Delays are also caused by the shipping system. Alstom hasn't found any company to ship the BM4s directly to Romania via the Port of Constanța, due to the possible threat of Russian mines being present in the Black Sea, leading Alstom to ship the trains to the Port of Hamburg by sea, and by road to Bucharest.

== Design and features ==
The BM4 reuses and refines the Vagn 2000 basis for the design, introduced with the Bombardier MOVIA 346 trainsets and later refined with the CAF Inneo BM3 trainsets. The front is inspired after the final Bombardier MOVIA design language before Alstom's takeover in 2021, resulting in a similar front to Singapore's MOVIA R151. The livery is similar to the CAF Inneo BM3, though with an orange stripe signifying their use on line M5.

As usual the trainsets are configured in a R1–MP1–M1–M2–MP2–R2 formation, with R meaning Trailer Car (Romanian: Remorcă), MP being Power Car with Shunting Pantograph (Romanian: Motor Pantograf) and M being Power Car (Motor).

It includes several upgrades. Passenger ventilation is now powered by six large HVAC units, a first for the Bucharest Metro, alongside the enhanced security with CCTV cameras, better passenger information with LCD displays, larger windows and stainless steel seats. The cabs can be easily dismantled for driverless operation in the future.

== Roster ==
Like the Bombardier MOVIA 346 and CAF Inneo BM3 trainsets, the Alstom Metropolis BM4s are christened by Metrorex, in this case after Romanian counties.

- 1401-2401 "Ilfov"
- 1402-2402 "Giurgiu"
- 1403-2403 "Teleorman"
- 1404-2404 "Sălaj"
- 1405-2405 "Sibiu"
- 1406-2406 "Cluj"
- 1407-2407 "Iași"
- 1408-2408 "Constanța"
- 1409-2409 "Brașov"
- 1410-2410 "Maramureș"
- 1411-2411 "Bihor"
- 1412-2412 "Galați"
- 1413-2413

== See also ==
- Bucharest Metro
