= Astra IVA =

Metro train used in the Bucharest Metro

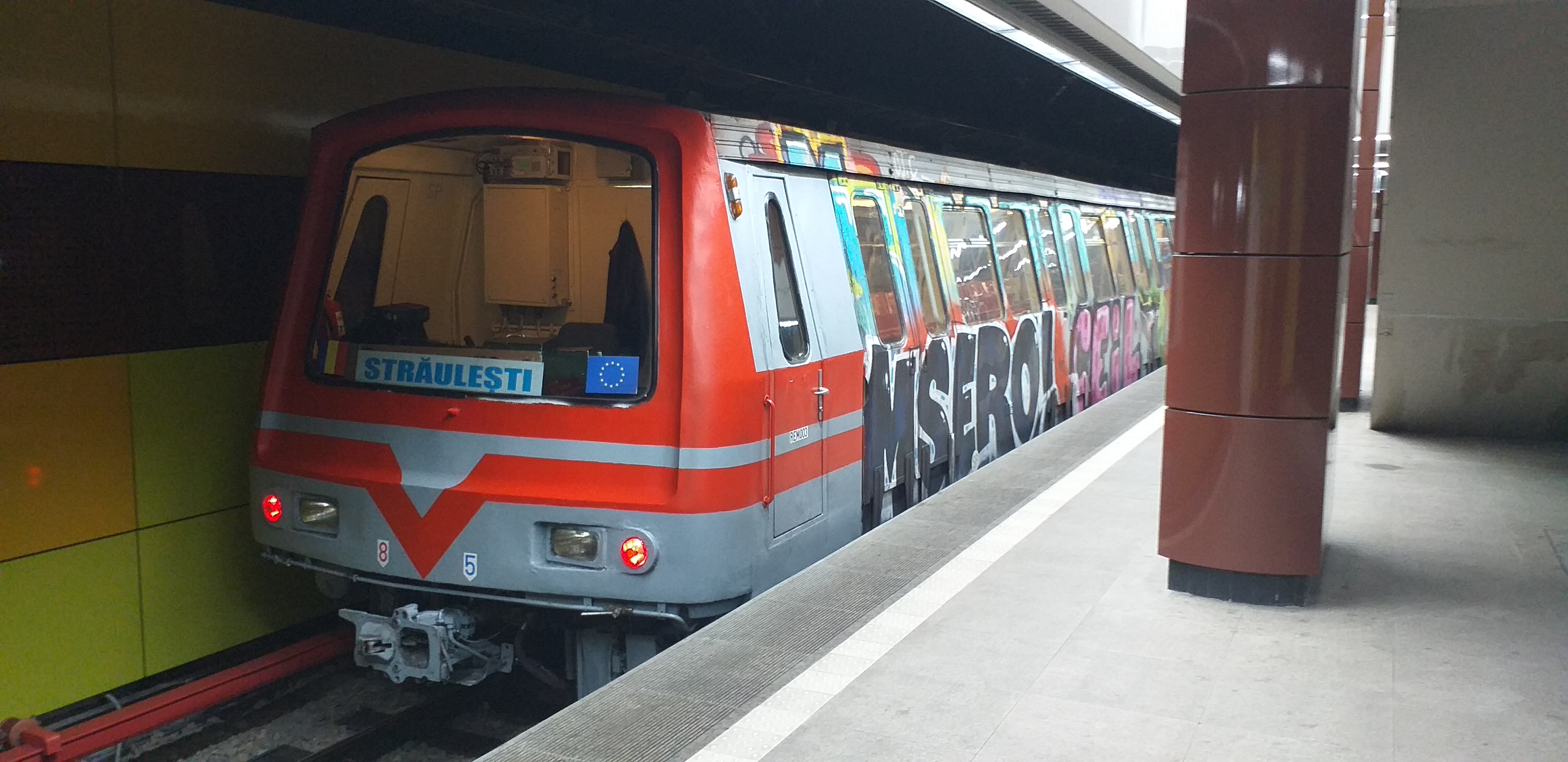
- Astra IVA unit 003, one of the oldest still in use, at Străulești in 2019. This unit was made in 1978, being the first from the production series.

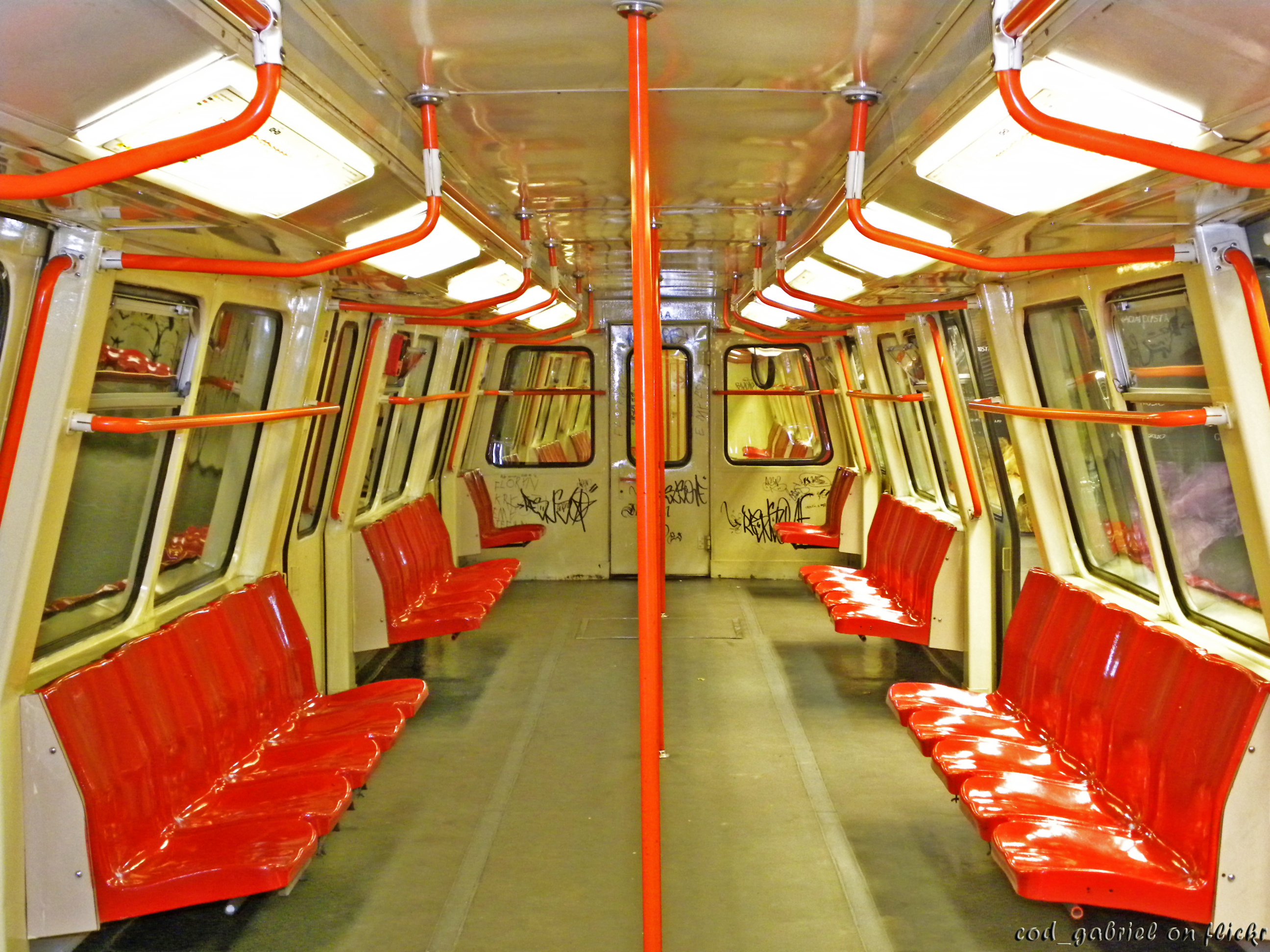
- Interior of an Alstom-refurbished IVA trainset, July 2011
- In service: 1979–present
- Manufacturer: Întreprinderea de Vagoane Arad (IVA)
- Constructed: 1976, 1978–1992
- Entered service: 16 November 1979; 46 years ago
- Refurbished: 1994–1996 (FAUR), 2000–2003, 2008, 2011–2014 (Alstom)
- Scrapped: 2007–
- Number built: 504 cars (250 2-car sets + 2 prototype sets)
- Formation: Married pairs
- Fleet numbers: 001–252 (001* and 002* prototypes)
- Capacity: 332 (68 seated, 264 standing)
- Operator: Bucharest Metro
- Depots: Ciurel/Semănătoarea, Pantelimon, Berceni, Militari, Străulești
- Lines served: M3, M4

Specifications
- Train length: 38 m (124 ft 8 1/16 in)
- Car length: 19 m (62 ft 4 1/16 in)
- Width: 3.1 m (10 ft 2 1/16 in)
- Height: 3.6 m (11 ft 9 3/4 in)
- Doors: 4 doors per side/car
- Maximum speed: 80 km/h (50 mph)
- Weight: 72 t (71 long tons; 79 short tons)
- Traction system: DC
- Traction motors: 4 × 215 kW (288 hp)
- Power output: 860 kW (1,150 hp)
- Acceleration: 1.3 m/s^{2} (4.3 ft/s^{2})
- Deceleration: 1.3 m/s^{2} (4.3 ft/s^{2}) (service); 2 m/s^{2} (6.6 ft/s^{2}) (emergency)
- HVAC: Driver Only
- Electric systems: 750 V DC third rail
- Current collection: Contact shoe
- UIC classification: B′B′+B′B′
- Safety systems: INDUSI (ATP), Siemens TBS100FB (ATO/ATP)
- Coupling system: Non-electric
- Multiple working: Yes (before refurbishment), No (after refurbishment)
- Track gauge: 1,432 mm (4 ft 8 3/8 in)

Astra IVA is a family of metro train used by Bucharest Metro, of which 504 cars (252 two-car sets) were built between 1976 and 1993 by Întreprinderea de Vagoane Arad (IVA) in Arad, Romania. Internally they are known as the BM1 (Bucharest Metro 1st generation).

== History ==
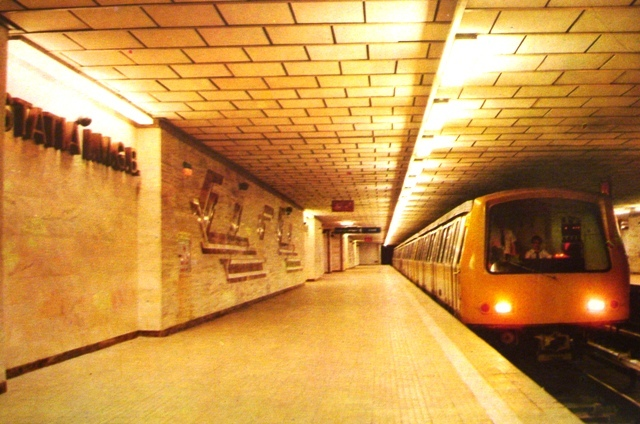
An Astra IVA train in original yellow livery at IMGB station (now Dimitrie Leonida station)

The prototype was made in 1976, with series production starting in 1978. There were three batches, the first being made in 1978-1980 and being distinctive from the others due to a "pit" in the front end, the second one being made between 1980 and 1985, and the third one made from 1985 to 1992, featuring red-silver instead of yellow paint from delivery. The design of these cars was based on that of the Rohr trains used on the Bay Area Rapid Transit system in San Francisco.

The trains used on the system are made up of various trainsets (Ramă Electrică de Metrou) connected together (Tren Electric de Metrou). Each trainset is made up of two permanently connected train-cars (B′B′+B′B′ formation) that can only be run together. Normally, 3 two-car sets are coupled together to make a complete six-car formation.

Between 1994 and 1996, 42 cars (21 two-car sets) were refurbished by FAUR and Electroputere for service on Line M3 using Secheron Hasler equipment, however for unknown reasons the refurbishment project was abandoned in favor of buying new trainsets and they are currently preserved at Berceni Depot. These trains were distinguished by a blue livery, and featured new technical equipment.

An attempt to build more intermediate coaches to allow for a 3-car x 2 formation was abandoned in 1995.

In 2000, selected Astra IVA pairs were refurbished and equipped with new ATO and ATP signalling systems using then Dimetronic's TBS100FB system, meant for STO operation on the then new Line M4, between Gara de Nord 2 and 1 Mai stations. The Astra IVA trains also underwent further refurbishment by Alstom in 2008, and again in 2011–2014.

The Astra Arad rolling stock is approaching the end of its service life, so the cars are being gradually phased out in favour of newer Bombardier Movia and CAF trains. As of January 2017, 15 trainsets (90 modular cars) are in commercial service.

In 2020, due to the deployment of several Bombardier BM2 sets on the M5 metro line, several IVA sets were sent back on the M3 line to fill in shortages of rolling stock, their redeployment commencing on 24 May.

== See also ==
- Bucharest Metro
