= Berceni metro station =

Bucharest metro station

Coordinates: 44°21′47″N 26°08′52″E

M2 Berceni
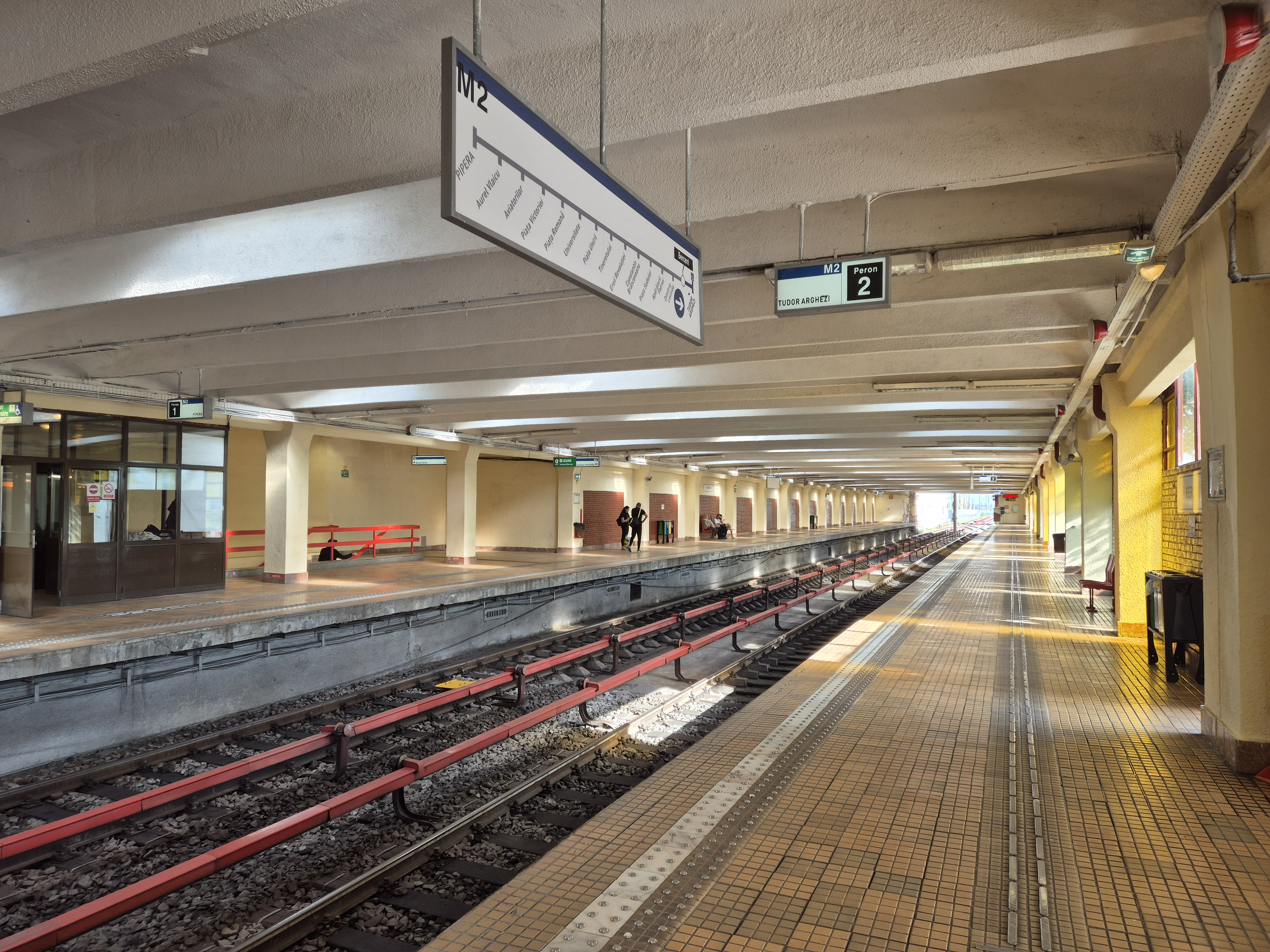
- Berceni metro station

General information
- Location: IMGB Industrial Area; Sector 4, Bucharest; Romania
- Owner: Metrorex
- Platforms: 2 side platforms
- Tracks: 2
- Bus routes: STB: 125; STV: 480

Construction
- Structure type: At grade
- Accessible: Yes

History
- Opened: 24 January 1986
- Former names: Depoul IMGB (1986-2009)

Services
Preceding station	Bucharest Metro	Following station
Tudor Arghezi Terminus	Line M2	Dimitrie Leonida towards Pipera
Location

Berceni, formerly known as Depoul IMGB (IMGB Depot, in English) is a metro station in Bucharest, Romania. Until 2023, it served as the southern terminus of Line M2, when Tudor Arghezi station was opened. Along with it, they are the only above-ground stations in the entire metro system.

This station is located in the suburbs of Bucharest, straddling the line between the capital city and the town of Popești-Leordeni in Ilfov County. It was opened on 24 January 1986 as the terminus of the inaugural section of the line, from Piața Unirii.
