= Pipera =

Neighborhood in Voluntari, Romania

Coordinates: 44°30′N 26°08′E

Pipera village is a neighborhood in Voluntari, Ilfov County, at the northern edge of the city of Bucharest, Romania.

== Development ==
Until 1995, Pipera was an ordinary village. After that, an "El Dorado" of land transactions began. Plots of land that were US$1/m^{2} reached in 2005 the US$250/m^{2}. In this time, more than 1,400 houses were built there, transforming Pipera in one of the most expensive residential areas. Between 2002 and 2011, in just ten years, the surface of the residential area doubled in size.

The residential area expanding quickly and faster than the street network created many problems and concerns, such as urban planning, traffic control, water supply and electrical supply.

A shopping park was also built, initially as a Carrefour and Bricostore, and later developed into a Metro, a Selgross Cash & Carry, an IKEA and, most importantly, Băneasa Shopping City. However, these have been developed chaotically.

== Transportation ==
This massive increase had a great impact on road transportation in the area. It seems that the number of cars exceeds the limit of traveling in comfort from Pipera to Bucharest and back. For this, the City Hall of Voluntari has started building a bridge on one of the two roads connecting it to the city. The work started in early 2007 and ended in 2012. This improved the traffic flow, but the lack of parking spaces and of one-way streets still causes major issues.

== Infrastructure ==
The district is served by the Pipera metro station, albeit far from the actual village, on the northern terminus of Bucharest Metro Line M2.

The Pipera industrial center (Romanian: platforma industrială) is on the site of a former airport (Pipera Airport) from the interwar period.
