= Sun Plaza (Bucharest) =

Coordinates: 44°23′46″N 26°07′23″E

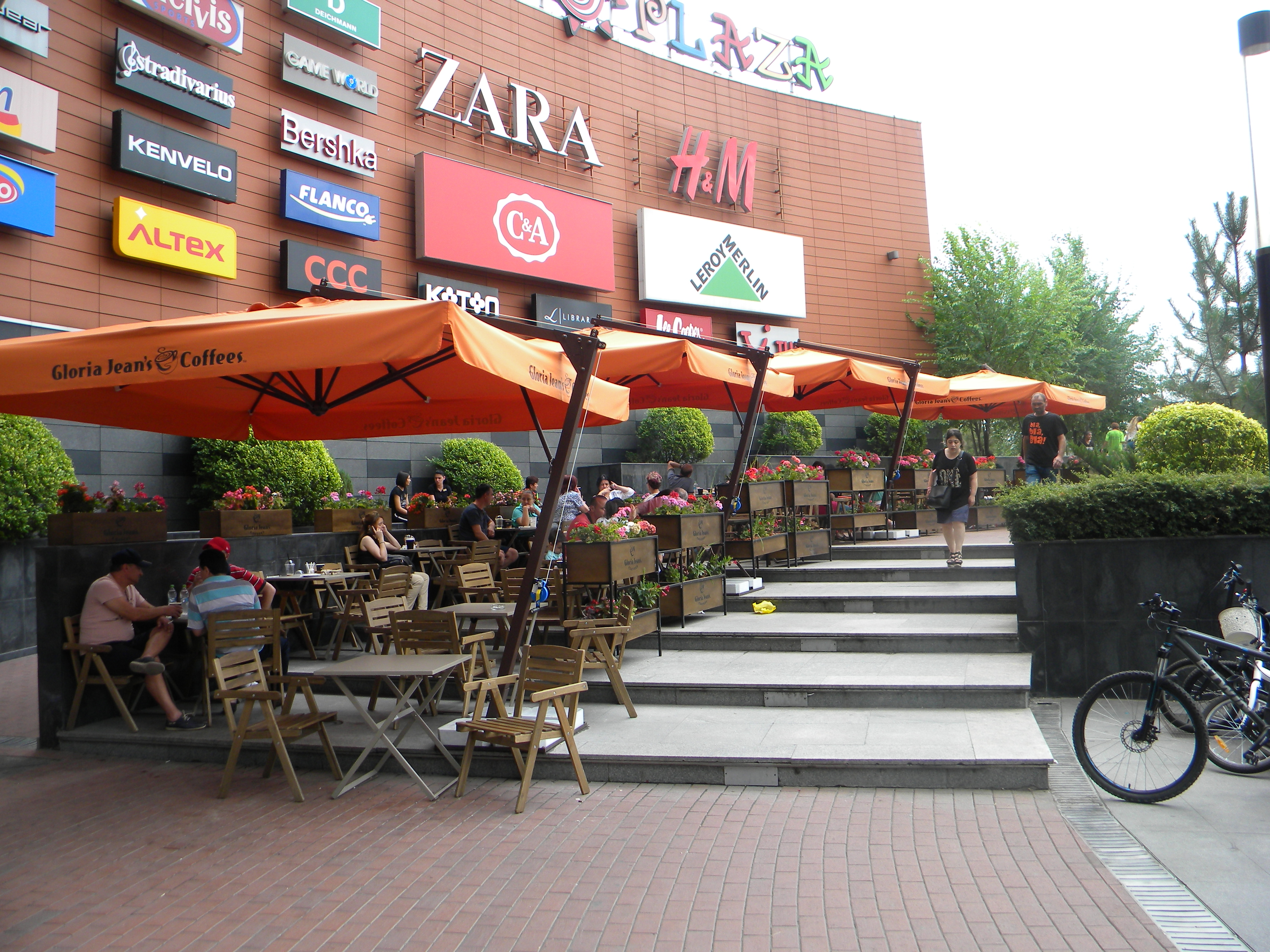
- Location: Bucharest, Romania
- Address: Calea Văcărești no. 391, Sector 4, Bucharest 040069
- Opened: February 25, 2010; 16 years ago
- Developer: EMCT Romania
- Owner: S IMMO (CPI Property Group)
- Architect: Chapman Taylor
- Num. of stores: 170
- Floor area: 81,000 m^{2} (870,000 sq ft)
- Floors: 4
- Parking: 2,000
- Website: sun-plaza.ro

Sun Plaza is a shopping mall in Bucharest, Romania. It was developed by EMCT Romania and opened in February 2010, and is owned by S IMMO (part of CPI Property Group) and managed by CBRE Romania, under the design of the international firm of architects Chapman Taylor. The mall has a total built area of 208,000 m², of which 81,000 m² is retail floor area, across four levels (two dedicated to shopping), and houses over 170 stores.

The mall

- 1 hypermarket - Auchan (new-generation store, approx. 7,000 m², scheduled to open at the end of 2026; it replaces Carrefour, which took over the space from the original anchor Cora in 2023 and left the mall in 2025)
- 1 DIY store Leroy Merlin (12,300 m²)
- over 170 stores, including anchors: Zara (retailer), C&A, H&M, Hervis, Humanic, Deichmann, Koton, Flanco
- a 15-screen Cinema City complex
- fast-foods and restaurants
- a kids playground
- games & entertainment
- 2,000 underground & deck parking spaces
- more than 3,500 m² of outdoor terrace (1st floor)
- direct connection from Piața Sudului metro station by underground passage (June 2010)
- Sun Offices, a three-floor office building above the mall with over 10,000 m² of leasable space, owned by the same group

History and renovation

In 2017 the centre completed an expansion of around 20,000 m² that added some 40 new stores, winning the Construction & Investment Journal (CIJ) award for best renovation/expansion of the year. A further modernisation was announced in 2025, with CPI Romania investing about €100 million to reconfigure the retail mix; new brands including Primark, P&C and Reserved were added, and the Auchan hypermarket replaced Carrefour as the anchor tenant.

Public Art

The Austrian artist Peter Kogler, a pioneer of computer-generated art, produced two works for the centre: the design of the underground passage linking the metro station to the mall, made up of curved, vibrating lines that create optical illusions, and an illuminated installation 18 metres high and weighing about a tonne, at the time the largest single piece produced by the lighting company Zumtobel.
