= Bucharest Metro =

Rapid transit system in Romania

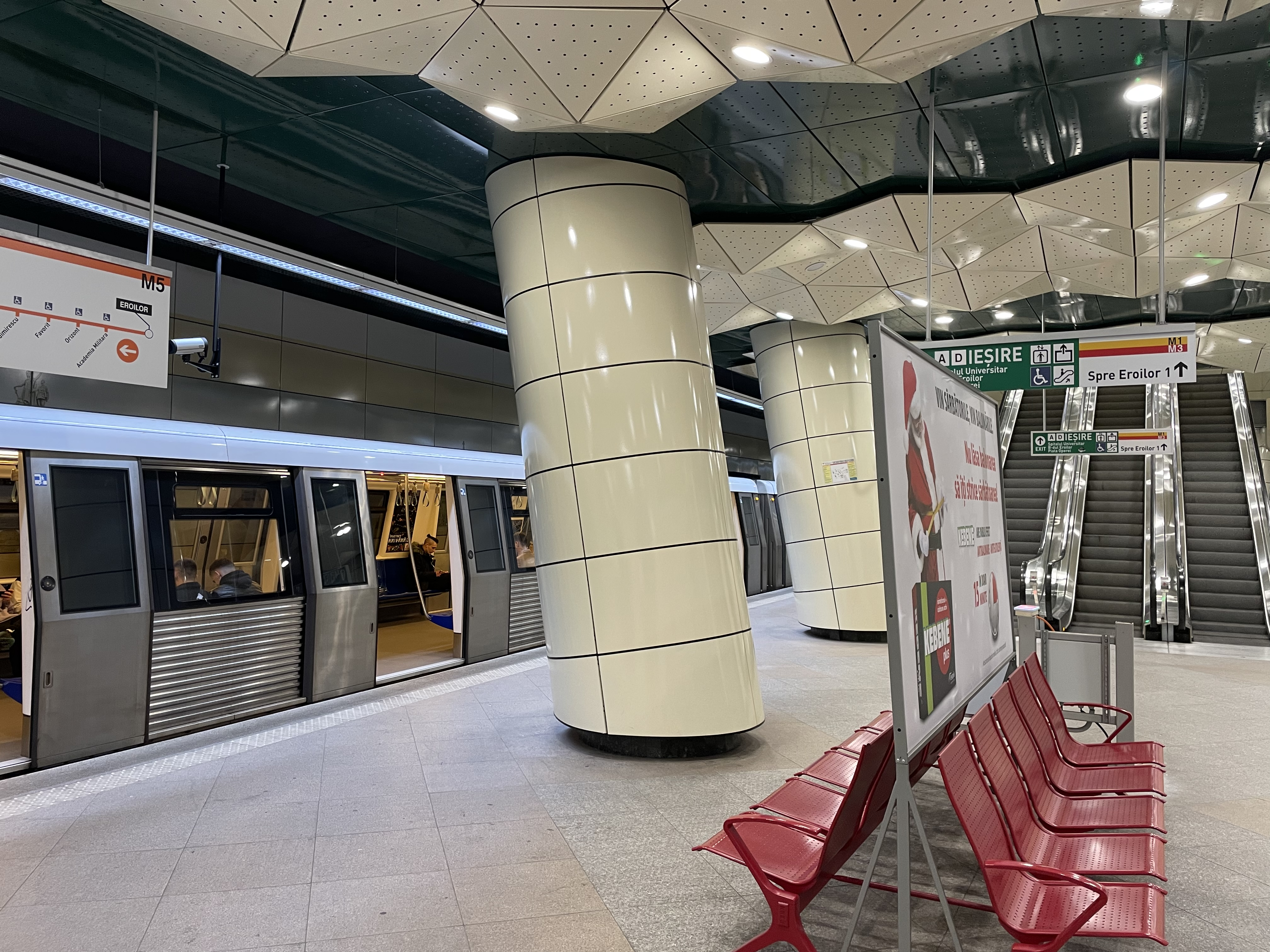
- Metro at Eroilor Station in 2022

Overview
- Native name: Metroul București
- Locale: Bucharest, Romania
- Transit type: Rapid transit
- Number of lines: 5 (plus 1 under construction)
- Line number: M1, M2, M3, M4, M5
- Number of stations: 64 (plus 12 under construction)
- Annual ridership: 142,783,000 passengers (2023)
- Chief executive: Mariana Miclăuș
- Website: www.metrorex.ro

Operation
- Began operation: 16 November 1979; 47 years ago
- Operator: Metrorex S.A.
- Number of vehicles: 594 cars (2018)
- Train length: 6 car trains

Technical
- System length: 79.36 km (49.3 mi)
- Track gauge: 1,432 mm (4 ft 8 3/8 in)
- Electrification: 750 V DC third rail
- Average speed: 36 km/h (22 mph)
- Top speed: 80 km/h (50 mph)

The Bucharest Metro (Romanian: Metroul din București) is an underground rapid transit system that serves Bucharest, the capital of Romania. It first opened for service on 16 November 1979. The network is run by Metrorex. One of two parts of the larger Bucharest public transport network, Metrorex had an annual ridership of 142,783,000 passengers during 2023, compared to over a billion annual passengers on Bucharest's STB transit system. In total, the Metrorex system is 79.36 kilometres (49.3 mi) long and has 64 stations.

The Bucharest Metro has five lines (M1, M2, M3, M4, and M5). The newest metro line, M5, was opened in 2020. A sixth metro line, M6 line, is currently under construction.

As of 2024, Bucharest Metro is the only metro system in Romania; with a second one, the Cluj-Napoca Metro, being under construction.

== Overview ==
Bucharest Metro is part of the Bucharest public transport network which also includes STB, which operates a complex network of buses, trolleybuses, light rail and trams. STB is Bucharest's surface public network system, while Bucharest Metro operates underground (a short stretch between Dimitrie Leonida and Tudor Arghezi metro stations is the only portion of the Bucharest Metro that does not run underground). Until relatively recently, car ownership in Romania was not common: during the first part of the 20th century few people had cars, and the subsequent communist regime installed after World War II restricted personal car use. The public transportation system in Bucharest has its origin in the 19th century, with the city introducing horse-drawn trams in 1872.

== History ==
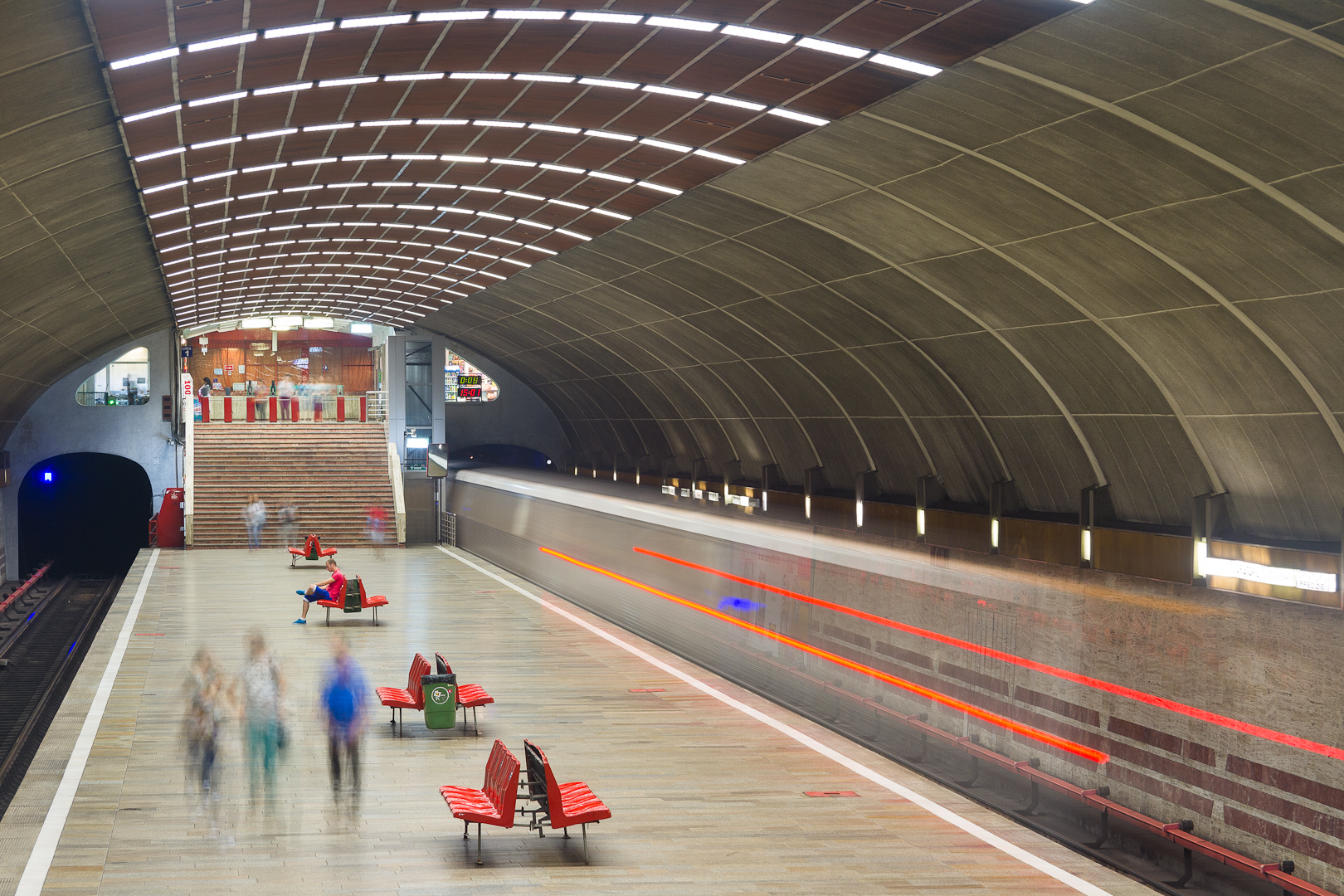
Titan metro station on M1 Line

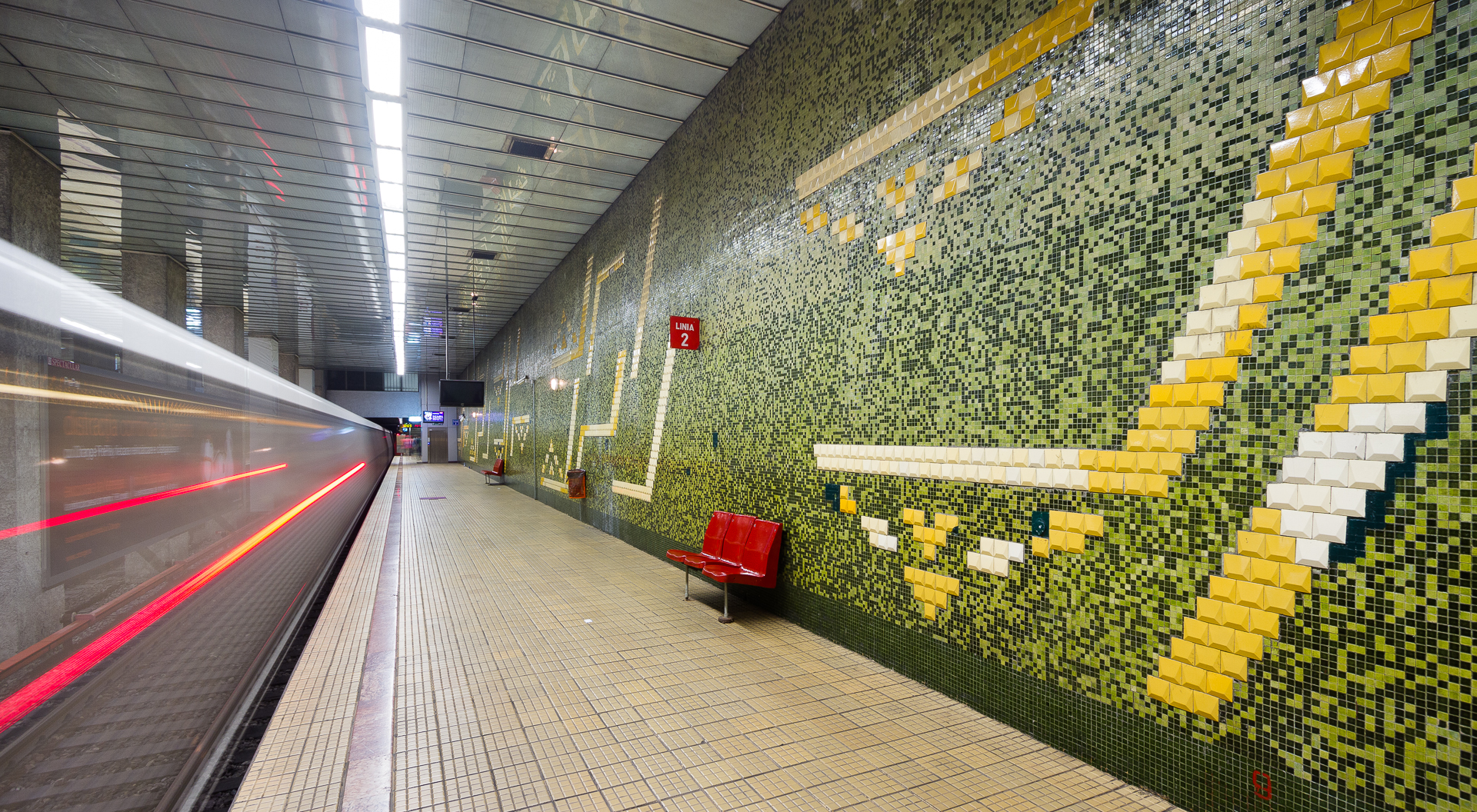
Grozăvești metro station

The first proposals for a metro system in Bucharest were made in the early part of the 20th century, by the Romanian engineers Dimitrie Leonida and Elie Radu.

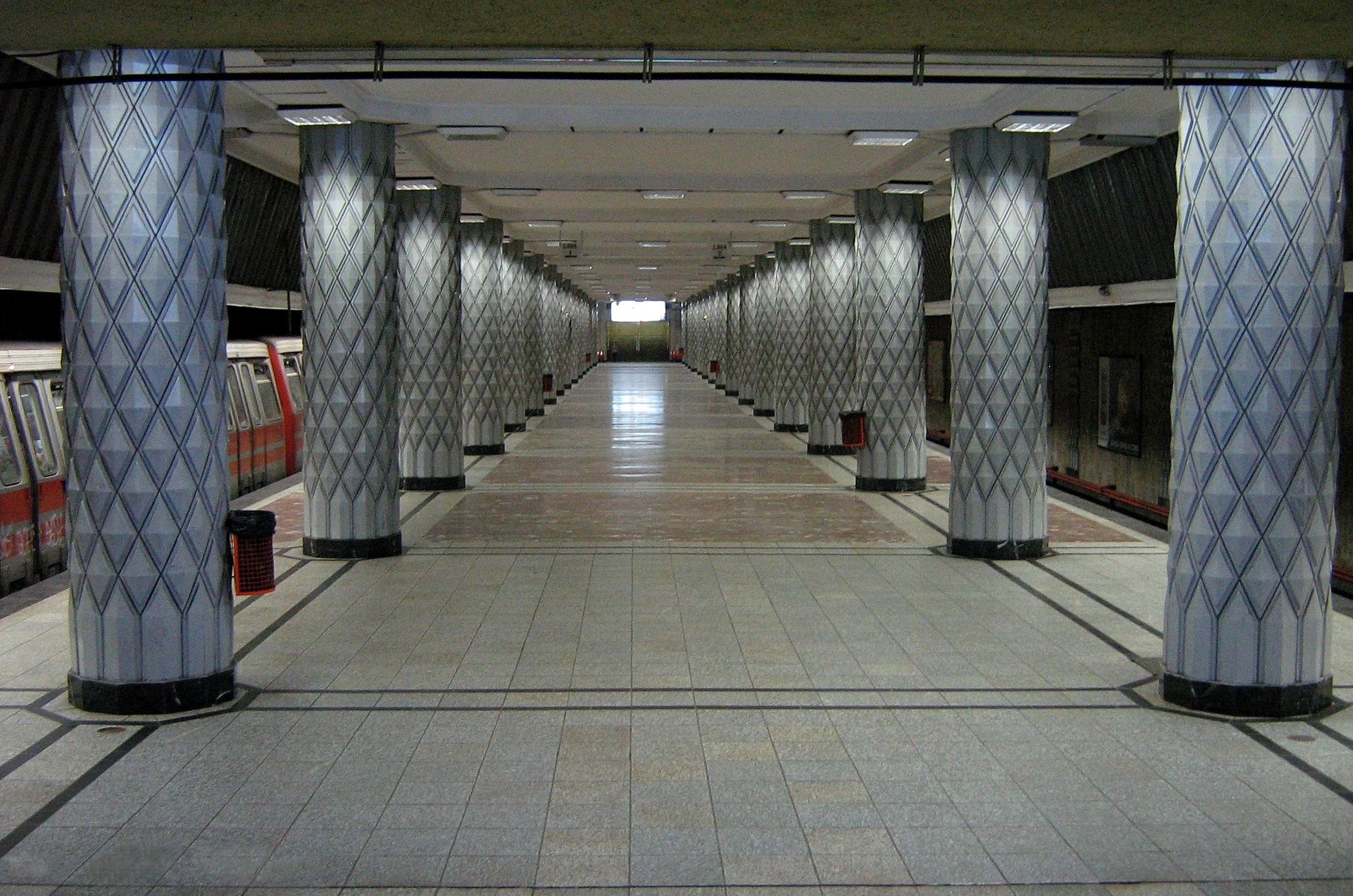
Politehnica metro station

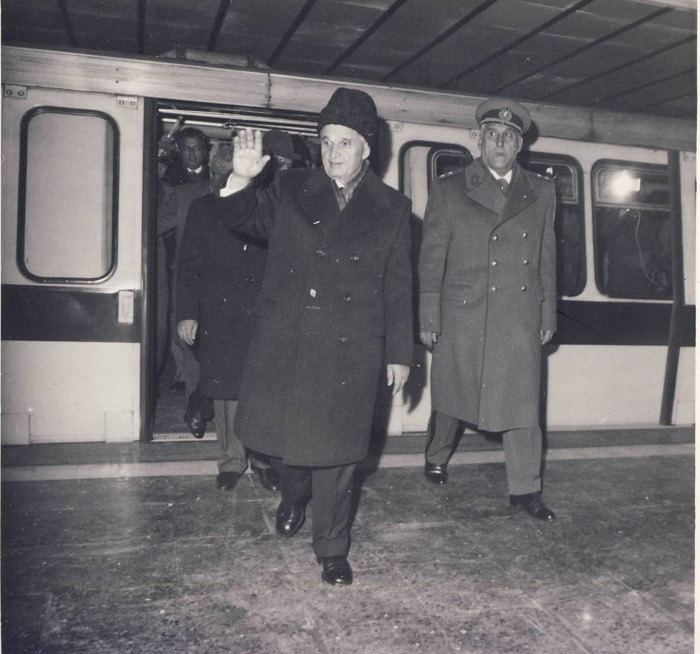
Nicolae Ceaușescu at the inauguration of the Timpuri Noi – Republica route on 28 December 1981

The earliest plans for a Bucharest Metro were drafted in the late 1930s, alongside the general plans for urban modernization of the city. The outbreak of World War II, followed by periods of political tensions culminating with the installation of communism, put an end to the plans.

By 1970, the public transport system (ITB) was no longer adequate due to the fast pace of urban development, although the system was the fourth-largest in Europe. A commission was set up, and its conclusion pointed to the necessity of an underground transit system that would become the Bucharest Metro. The plan for the first line was approved on 25 November 1974 as part of the next five-year plan and the construction on the new metro system started on 20 September 1975.

The network was not built in the same style as other Eastern European systems. Firstly, the design of the stations on the initial lines was simple, clean-cut modern, with most stations being relatively austere, without excessive additions such as mosaics, awkward lighting sources or elaborate and ornate decoration. The main function of the stations was speed of transit and practicality. Secondly, the trainsets themselves were all constructed in Romania and did not follow the Eastern European style of construction. Each station usually followed a colour theme (generally white – in Unirii 2 (Union 2), Victoriei 1 (Victory 1), Lujerului; but also light blue – in Obor, Universitate (University), and Gara de Nord (North Train Station); orange – in Tineretului (Of Youth Station); green – in Grozăvești), and an open plan. No station was made to look exactly like any other. Despite this, many stations are rather dark, due to the policies of energy economy in the late 1980s, with later modernisations doing little to fix this problem.

During the 1980s, the metro network expanded very rapidly, at a rate only surpassed by that of the Mexico City Metro. Two more lines were opened during this decade, M3 in 1983, and M2 in 1986. After the 1989 Romanian Revolution, the socioeconomic and political turmoil of the 1990s largely stagnated the expansion of the metro. Advancement of the construction was difficult; for example, the Gorjului metro station was built in two stages (1994 outbound platform and 1998 inbound platform), and as a consequence the two platforms and associated vestibules were built with different materials and with different colour schemes. The fourth metro line, M4, for which construction was started in September 1989 (shortly before the Revolution), was finally opened in 2000. After Romania joined the European Union in 2007, EU funds helped with the expansion of the metro. The M5 line was opened in 2020, and the M6 line is under construction.

Due to Bucharest being one of the largest cities in the region, the network is larger than those of Prague, Warsaw, Budapest or Sofia. Bucharest Metro is also larger than some other metro systems within the European Union, such as: Rome Metro, Copenhagen Metro, Helsinki Metro, Amsterdam Metro, Brussels Metro, and Lisbon Metro. In addition, there are plans to extend the existing lines and to open two more lines: M7 and M8. Bucharest Metro opened in 1979 (line M1), shortly after Brussels Metro (1976), Vienna U-Bahn (1976) and Amsterdam Metro (1977), and before Helsinki Metro (1982) or Copenhagen Metro (2002).

The first line, M1, opened on 19 November 1979, running from Semănătoarea (now Petrache Poenaru) to Timpuri Noi. It had a length of 8.1 kilometres (5.0 mi) with 6 stations. Following this, more lines and several extensions were opened:

- 28 December 1981: M1 Timpuri Noi – Republica; 9.2 kilometres (5.7 mi), 6 stations
- 19 August 1983: M1 (now M3) Branch line Eroilor – Industriilor (now Preciziei); 8.2 kilometres (5.1 mi), 4 stations (Gorjului added later)
- 22 December 1984: M1 Semănătoarea (Petrache Poenaru) – Crângași; 0.97 kilometres (0.60 mi), 1 station
- 24 January 1986: M2 Piața Unirii (Union Square) – Depoul IMGB (now Berceni); 9.96 kilometres (6.19 mi), 6 stations (Tineretului and Constantin Brâncoveanu added later)
- 6 April 1986: M2 Tineretului; 1 infill station
- 24 October 1987: M2 Piața Unirii (Union Square) – Pipera; 8.72 kilometres (5.42 mi), 5 stations (Piața Romană = Roman Square, added later)
- 24 December 1987: M1 Crângași – Gara de Nord 1 (North Train Station 1); 2.83 kilometres (1.76 mi), 1 station (Basarab added later)
- 28 November 1988: M2 Piața Romană (Roman Square); 1 infill station
- 5 December 1988: M2 Constantin Brâncoveanu; 1 infill station
- 17 August 1989: M3 (now M1) Gara de Nord 1 (North Train Station 1) – Dristor 2; 7.8 kilometres (4.8 mi), 6 stations
- May 1991: M1 Republica – Pantelimon; 1.43 kilometres (0.89 mi), 1 station (single track, operational on a special schedule)
- 26 August 1992: M1 Basarab; 1 infill station
- 31 August 1994: M3 Gorjului; 1 infill station (westbound platform only; eastbound platform opened in 1998)
- 1 March 2000: M4 Gara de Nord 2 (North Train Station 2) – 1 Mai (First of May); 3.6 kilometres (2.2 mi), 4 stations
- 20 November 2008: M3 branch Nicolae (Nicolas) Grigorescu 2 – Linia de Centură (now Anghel Saligny), 4.75 kilometres (2.95 mi), 4 stations
- 1 July 2011: M4 1 Mai – Parc Bazilescu, 2.62 kilometres (1.63 mi), 2 stations
- 31 March 2017: M4 Parc Bazilescu – Străulești, 1.89 kilometres (1.17 mi), 2 stations
- 15 September 2020: M5 Râul Doamnei / Valea Ialomiței – Eroilor 2 6.87 kilometres (4.27 mi), 10 stations
- 15 November 2023: M2 Berceni – Tudor Arghezi, 1,6 kilometers (1 mi.), 1 station

Expansions in the near future (estimative):

- 2027: M6 1 Mai (First of May) - Tokyo, 6.6 kilometres (4.1 mi), 6 stations
- 2028: M6 Tokyo - Otopeni Airport, 7.6 kilometres (4.7 mi), 6 stations
- 2030: M5 Eroilor 2 - Piața Iancului (Iancu's Square) 2, 5,4 kilometers (2 mi.), 6 stations

Lines M1 and M3 have been sharing the section between Eroilor and Nicolae Grigorescu.

Lines M5 have been sharing the section between Romancerilor.

Lines M4 and M6 have been sharing the section between Gara de Nord 2 and 1 Mai.

The newest metro station, Tudor Arghezi (M2), was opened on 15 November 2023. Between that date and 8 May 2024, all services to Tudor Arghezi ran in a shuttle service from Berceni, because the signalling and automatisation systems were not yet finished.

Large stations which connect with other lines, such as Piața Victoriei, have two terminals, and each terminal goes by a different name (Victoriei 1 and Victoriei 2). On the official network map, they are shown as two stations with a connection in between, even though, in fact – and for trip planners – they are a single station with platforms at different levels. There is one exception: Gara de Nord 1 and Gara de Nord 2 are separate stations (although linked through a subterranean passage, the traveller is required to exit the station proper and pay for a new fare at the other station, thus leaving the system), passengers being required to change trains at Basarab.

Generally, the underground stations feature large interiors. The largest one, Piata Unirii, is cathedral-like, with vast interior spaces, hosting retail outlets and fast-food restaurants and has an intricate network of underground corridors and passageways.

== Metrorex ==
Network Map

Metrorex is the Romanian company which runs the Bucharest Metro. It is fully owned by the Romanian Government through the Ministry of Transportation. There were plans to merge the underground and overground transportation systems into one authority subordinated to the City of Bucharest, however these plans did not come to fruition.

== Infrastructure and network ==
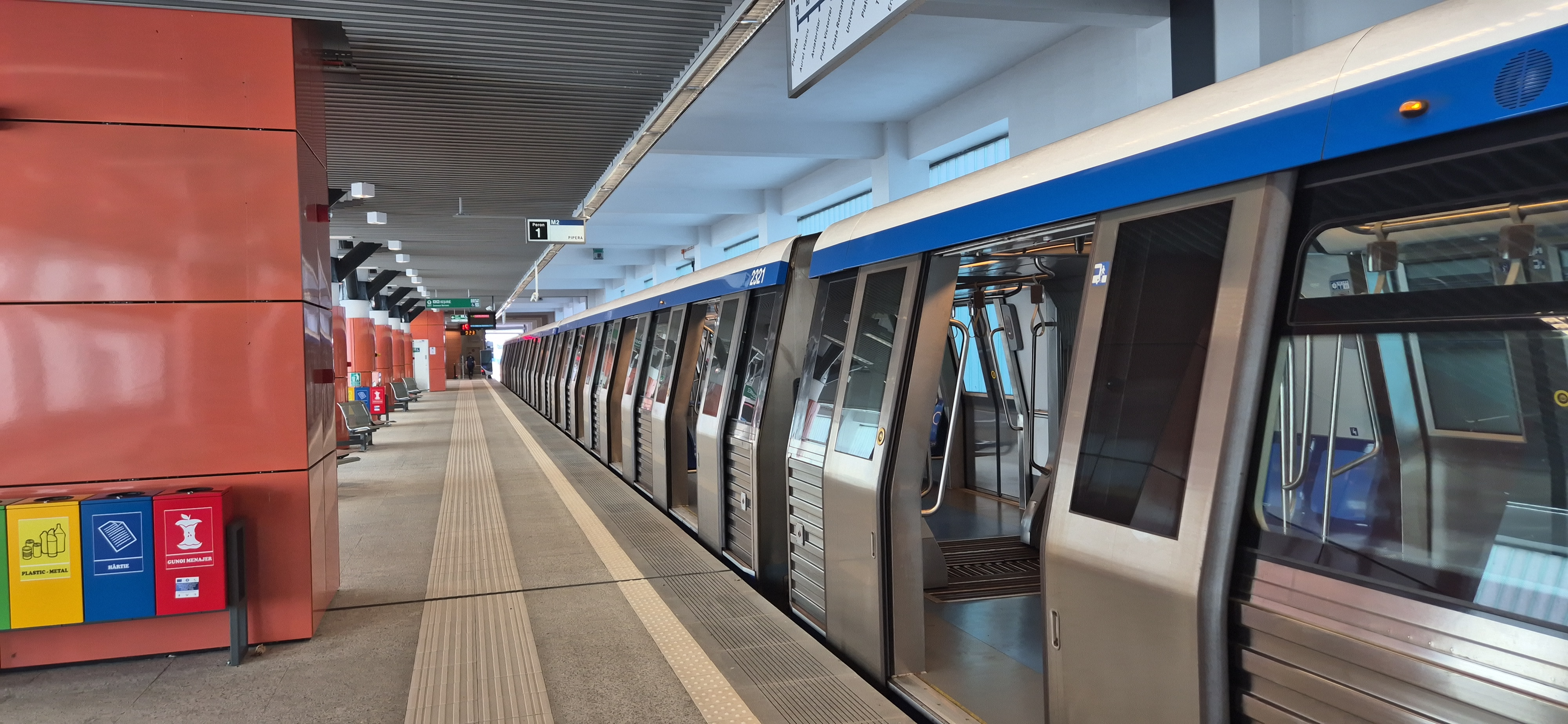
Tudor Arghezi metro station, which is latest station to be opened, in 2023, and is the newest terminus of the M2 Line from Pipera.

As of 2023, the entire network runs underground, except for a stretch between Dimitrie Leonida and Tudor Arghezi stations on the southern end of the M2 line. All metro stations are underground, except two (Berceni and Tudor Arghezi, which are the former terminus and current terminus, respectively, of line M2). The network is served by six depots, two being located above ground (IMGB and Industriilor) and four underground (Ciurel, Străulești, Pantelimon and Valea Ialomiței) and smaller additional works at Gara de Nord 1, Eroilor 1, Republica, Parc Drumul Taberei, Favorit, Anghel Saligny, Crângași, Piața Victoriei 2 and Dristor 2 stations.

There are two connections between the Metro network and the Romanian Railways network, one at Berceni (connecting to the Bucharest Belt Ring), the other at Ciurel (connecting via an underground passage to the Cotroceni-Militari industrial railway). However, the latter connection is currently unused and mothballed. The metro network and the national rail network have almost similar track gauge (using the 1,432 mm / 4 ft 8 3/8 in vs 1,435 mm / 4 ft 8 1/2 in) and loading gauge but not the same electrification system (the metro uses 750 V DC third rail (Note: Overhead lines with same voltage employed only in works, depots and selected tunnels.) whereas the Romanian Railways use 25 kV 50 Hz AC overhead lines) making it possible for new metro cars to be transported cross country as unpowered railway cars. This distinction is also seen in the pre-2007 separation between the MTR and the former KCR network in Hong Kong (see Track gauge in Hong Kong).

=== Lines ===
There are five metro lines in operation and another one in the construction phase:

Line	Opened	Last expansion	Track length			Headway	
Line	Opened	Last expansion	operational	under construction	planned	off-peak	rush hour
M1	November; 1979	August; 1992	31.01 km	—N/a	—N/a	9–12 minutes (between Dristor 2 and Eroilor) (4 minutes between Eroilor and Nicolae Grigorescu)	3–6 minutes (3–3.5 minutes between Eroilor and Nicolae Grigorescu)
M2	January; 1986	November 2023	20.28 km	—N/a	3.0 km	4–7 minutes (weekdays off peak hours); 7–9 minutes (weekends, late nights)	1–3 minutes
M3	August; 1983	November; 2008	13.53 km + 8.67 km (M1)	—N/a	—N/a	7–9 minutes (4 minutes between Eroilor and Nicolae Grigorescu)	3–6 minutes (3–3.5 minutes between Eroilor and Nicolae Grigorescu)
M4	March; 2000	March; 2017	7.44 km	—N/a	10.6 km	8–10 minutes	7 minutes
M5	September; 2020	—N/a	6.87 km	—N/a	9.2 km	18 minutes (on each branch); 9 minutes (between Eroilor and Romancierilor)	12 minutes (on each branch); 6 minutes (between Eroilor and Romancierilor)
M6	2027–2028	—N/a	—N/a	14.2 km	—N/a	—N/a	
M7	2030+	—N/a	—N/a	—N/a	13 km	—N/a	
Total			79.13 km	14.2 km	35.8 km		

- M1 Line: between Dristor and Pantelimon – the first line to open in 1979, last extension in 1990; it is circular with a North-Eastern spur. Part of its tracks are shared with M3 (7 stations).
- M2 Line: between Pipera and Tudor Arghezi. opened in 1986, last extension opened in November 2023; it runs in a north–south direction, crossing the center.
- M3 Line: between Preciziei and Anghel Saligny opened in 1983, last extension in 2008; it runs in an east–west direction, south of the center. Shares part of its tracks with M1 (7 stations).
- M4 Line: between Gara de Nord and Străulești opened in 2000, last extension was opened in 2017. Part of its tracks will be shared with M6 (4 stations).
- M5 Line: between Râul Doamnei / Valea Ialomiței and Eroilor opened in 2020; it runs through the Drumul Taberei neighborhood.
- M6 Line: between Gara de Nord and Henri Coandă Airport. This line is bound to be opened partially from 2026. Part of its tracks will be shared with M4 (Gara de Nord - 1 Mai).
- M7 Line: between Piața Unirii and Bragadiru, planned to have 15 stations.

=== Signalling system ===
There are multiple signalling systems used. Line 2, the first one that has been modernized, uses Bombardier's CITYFLO 350 automatic train control system. It ensures the protection (ATP) and operation (ATO) of the new Bombardier Movia trains.

The system uses an IPU (Interlocking processing unit), TI21-M track circuits and EbiScreen workstations. Signals have been kept only in areas where points are present, meaning that the route has been assigned and the driver can use cab signalling. Trains are usually operated automatically, with the driver only opening and closing the doors and supervising the operation. Other features include auto turnback and a balise system, called PSM (precision stop marker). This ensures that the train can stop at the platform automatically.

On line 3, the ATC system has been merged with the Indusi system. Signals are present in point areas and platform ends. Along with the three red-yellow-green lights, the white ATP light has been added. Optical routes can be assigned, meaning that a train gets a green light (permission to pass the signal) only after the next signal has been passed by the train ahead, or a yellow light, meaning that the signal can be passed at low speed. Automatic block signals have been removed.

Line 4 uses Siemens's TBS 100 FB ATC system.

Line 5 uses Alstom's Urbalis 400 Communications-based train control system.

=== Hours of operation ===
Trains run from 5 AM to 11 PM every day. The last trains on M1, M2 and M3 wait for the transfer of the passengers between lines to complete, before leaving Piața Unirii station.

=== Headway ===
At rush hour, trains run at 4–6-minute intervals on lines 1 and 3, at 1-3 minute intervals on line 2, and at 7–8-minute on line 4; during the rest of the day, trains run at 8-minute intervals on lines 1 and 3, at 7-9 minute intervals on line 2 and at 10-minute intervals on line 4.

=== Fares and tickets ===
Metrorex ticket

Public transport in Bucharest is heavily subsidized, and the subsidies will increase, as the City Council wants to reduce traffic jams, pollution and parking problems and promote public transport. Like the STB, the metro can get crowded during morning and evening rush hours. The network uses magnetic stripe cards, that are not valid for use on trams, buses or trolleybuses. Payment by contactless credit cards is available directly at the turnstiles. One tap will take 10 RON, the equivalent of one trip. For multiple validations with the same card, tap the plus button. Starting from 29 July 2021 Metrorex began replacing the magnetic stripe cards with contactless ones for weekly and monthly passes. As of November 2021 most of the cards with have been replaced with contactless ones.

==== Tickets ====
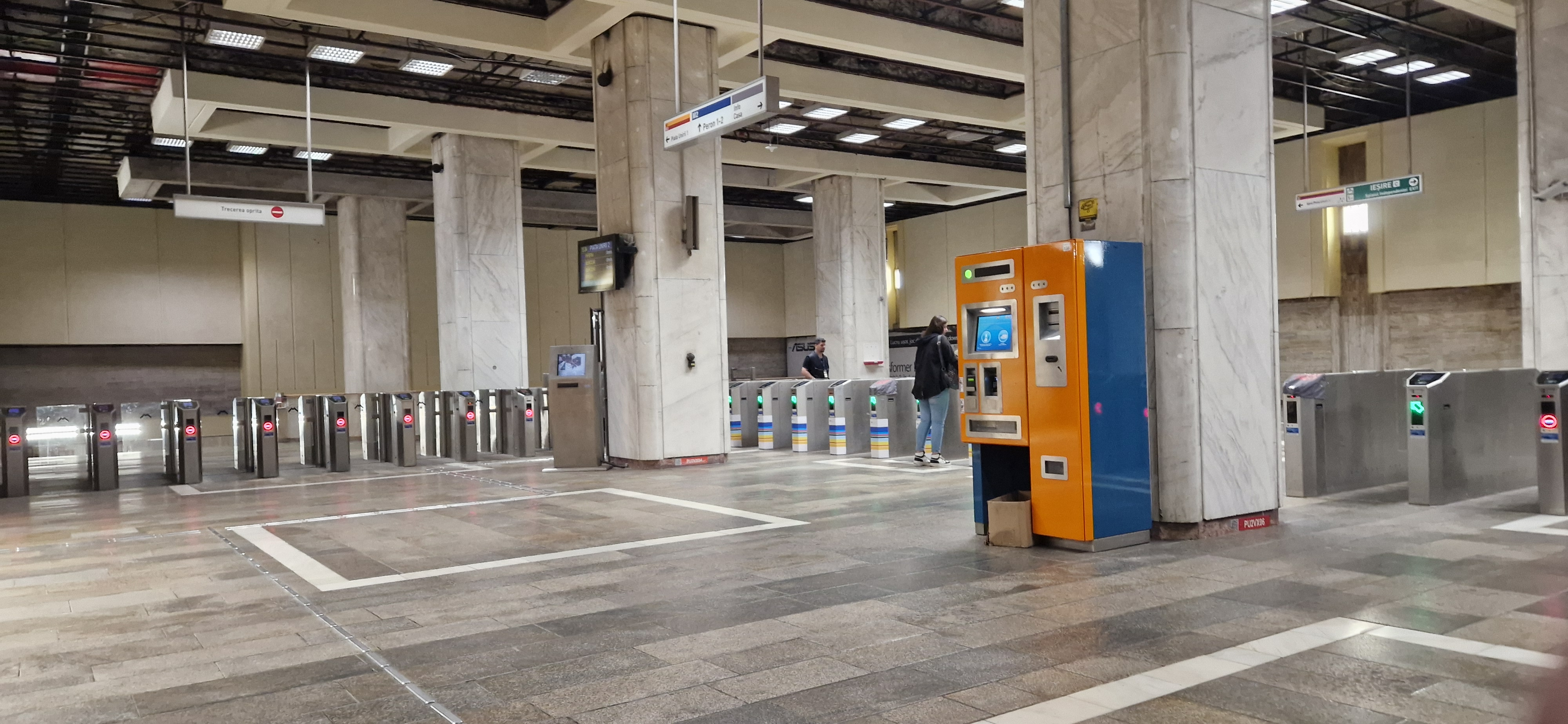
Piata Unirii (M2) metro station

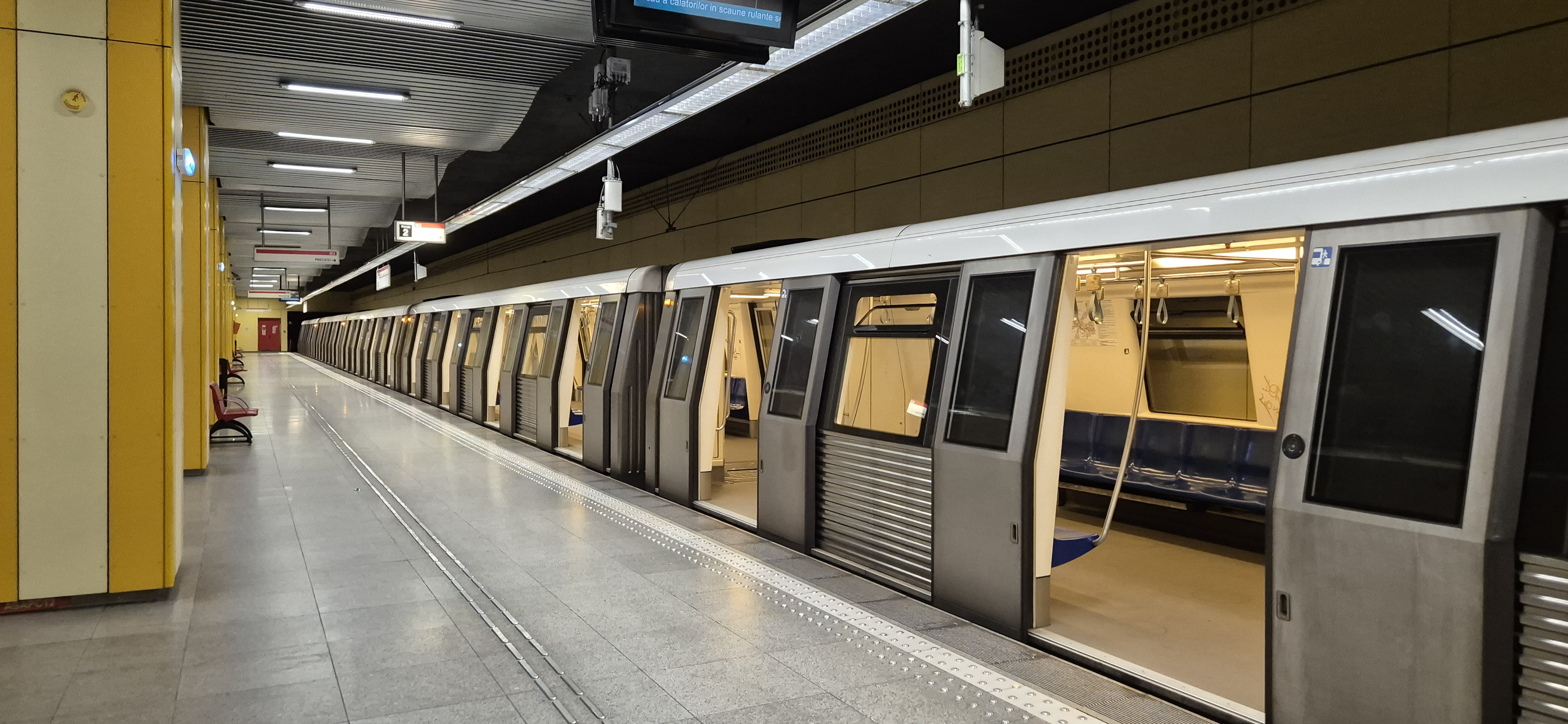
Anghel Saligny metro station

Tickets can be bought from any metro station, from both kiosks and vending machines. Prices:

Metrorex only tickets:

- 1-trip card – 5 RON
- 2-trip card – 10 RON(€2.00)
- 24 hour card – 12 RON (€2.40)
- 72 hour card – 35 RON
- 10-trip card – 40 RON
- Weekly pass (full price) – 45 RON
- Monthly pass (full price) – 100 RON
- Six months pass – 500 RON
- Yearly pass – 900 RON
- Student monthly pass (available for students in Romanian Schools, High-Schools and Universities) – 10 RON
- Blood donors monthly pass – 50 RON

Integrated Metro and STB Passes:

- 1 trip card valid for 120 minutes – 5 RON
- 2 trip card valid for 120 minutes – 10 RON
- 10 trip card valid for 120 minutes – 45 RON
- 24 hour card – 14 RON
- 72 hour card – 35 RON
- 7 days card – 35 RON
- Weekly pass – 50 RON
- Monthly pass – 140 RON
- Six month pass – 700 RON
- Yearly pass – 1200 RON

Integrated Metro, STB and train on the section between North Station and Bucharest Airport:

- 24 hour card - 20 RON
- 72 hour card - 40 RON
- Monthly pass - 210 RON
- Six month pass - 1100 RON
- Yearly pass - 2000 RON

Standard trip cards are sold as anonymous magnetic strip cards, whereas the passes are sold as either MIFARE Ultralight or MIFARE Classic 1000 cards. Passengers can also opt to pay for the trip directly at the gates using credit cards or with Apple Pay/Google Pay. This payment system was implemented in 2019 with VISA, BCR and S&T Romania.

== Future service ==
=== Under construction ===
- M6 Line: between Gara de Nord and Henri Coandă International Airport. The contract for the first part of the line, known as M6.1 between 1 Mai and Tokyo has been signed in 2022 with the Turkish company Alsim Alarko. They are tasked with designing and building the structural support of the stations and tunnels. The designing and construction contract for the second half to the Henri Coandă International Airport was signed in May 2023 with the Gülermak – Somet association.

=== Planned ===
- M2 Line: a further northbound extension of 1.6 km (0.99 mi) and two more stations from Pipera;
- M4 Line extension: between Gara de Nord, through Soseaua Giurgiului and ending at Gara Progresul at Bucharest's southern limit. The tender for the designing and building of this extension was launched on 26 April 2024.
- M5 Line: a further extension of 9.2 km (5.7 mi) to Pantelimon is approved;. The central part of M5, known as M5.2, is currently designed by Metrans Engineering and 3TI Progetti SpA.
- M7 Line; it is supposed to run 25 kilometres (16 mi) from Bragadiru to Voluntari and to have 29 stations. The first planned section, between Piața Unirii and Bragadiru, will be 13 kilometres (8.1 mi) long and will include 15 stations. The project is a partnership between Sector 5, Sector2, the Romanian Ministry of Transport, Metrorex and Ilfov County.

These projects are co-financed by the EU, with the exception of M6.2 which is co-financed by a loan from JICA, and M7 (TBD).

=== Other proposals ===
Metrorex is also planning the following new lines, routes and stations:

- M2 Line: a further southbound extension of 3 km (1.9 mi) and three more stations from Tudor Arghezi
- Line M8, the south half ring. Its route has not been fully planned yet, but it will run through Piața Sudului and end at Crângași and Dristor stations.
- An extension of the Line M3 is also planned for 2030.
- Two more stations are planned and may be constructed on existing lines, both on M1. However, given the complexity of work required, and the limited benefits these stations would have it is unlikely that construction will begin in the near future:
  - Dorobanți between Stefan cel Mare and Piața Victoriei;
  - Giulești between Crângași and Basarab.

== Rolling stock ==
The Bucharest Metro uses three types of trainsets:

- Astra IVA (BM1) – 84 trainsets (504 cars), built between 1976 and 1992. Only 15 trainsets (90 cars) are still operating. Until now, 69 trainsets (414 cars) have been retired from service. The remaining of 15 trainsets which are still active were refurbished by Metrorex and Alstom Transport România in 2011–2013. In the past, they were used on M1, M2, M3 and M4. Presently, they are still used on M4.
- Bombardier Movia 346 (BM2, BM21) – 44 trainsets (264 cars), built between 2002 and 2008, used on M1, M2, M3 and M5 (a modification of the Swedish SL C20 metro train type)
- CAF Inneo (BM3) – 24 trainsets (144 cars), built between 2013 and 2016, used on M2.
- Alstom Metropolis (BM4) - 13 trainsets built in Taubaté between 2023 and 2025, will be used on M5 when they will finish testing.

Vehicle	Type and description	Interior
	The Romanian designed Astra IVA trains, built in Arad, are made up of various trainsets (rame) connected together. Each trainset is made up of two permanently connected train-cars (B′B′+B′B′ formation) that can only be run together. The Astra IVA rolling stock is approaching the end of its service life, so it is gradually being phased out. They are used on the Bucharest Metro Lines M3 (only on weekdays due to lack of available Bombardier trainsets) and M4.	
	The Bombardier Movia 346 trains, a modification of the SL C20 type used in Sweden, are made up of six permanently connected cars, forming an open corridor for the entire length of the train (2′2′+Bo′Bo′+Bo′Bo′+Bo′Bo′+Bo′Bo′+2′2′ formation). Bombardier trains are used on all lines, except line M4. These trains were built in two series: the first 18 trains (BM2) and the last 26 trains (BM21). BM21 trains have some improvements compared to BM2 trains. These trains have electronic displays at the end of the rail cars and more grab bars.	
	In November 2011, Metrorex signed a €97 million contract with CAF for 16 metro trains (96 cars), with options for a further 8 sets (48 cars). The 114m-long six-car trains will be assembled in Romania. They each accommodate up to 1,200 passengers and are made up of four powered and two trailer vehicles. As of November 2014, all trains have been delivered and all 16 of them entered in service. As the CAF trains enter service, all of the Bombardier stock will be moved for use on line M3, according to Metrorex's plans to replace all of the old Astra IVA stock on the entire network. In November 2014, Metrorex signed an additional €47 million contract with CAF for 8 metro trains. As of 2018, 24 CAF trains are in use, exclusively on line M2.	
	In November 2020, Metrorex signed a €100 million contract with Alstom for 13 metro trains (78 cars), with options for a further 17 sets (102 cars). The trains are to be used on the line M5. The new Alstom Metropolis BM4 will be part of the Alstom Metropolis family. As of April 2024, the first train has arrived and is yet to complete testing.	

The subway livery for Bucharest is either white with two yellow or red horizontal stripes below the window for the Astra trains, stainless steel with black and white for the Bombardier trains, or stainless steel with blue and white for the CAF trains.

All trains run on a bottom-contact 750 V DC third rail, or an overhead wire in maintenance areas where a third rail would not be safe. Maximum speed on the system is 80 km/h (50 mph), although plans are to increase it to 100 km/h (62 mph) on M5, a new line that opened its first phase on 15 September 2020. New trains from the Alstom Metropolis family have been ordered, the first of which arrived in April 2024.

== Incidents ==
In its 46 years of operations, there have never been any very grave accidents, however, there have been various incidents, either during construction or operation. Accidents are investigated by the Railway Investigation Authority (Agenția de Investigare Feroviară Română (AGIFER)).

- 1983: Due to works on M2, the Piața Unirii 1 station was flooded by the Dâmbovița.
- April–May 1986: Whilst digging for a connection service tunnel for the M1-M2 lines, the foundations and altar of the Slobozia Church were cracked, leading to the subsequent closure of the construction site of the tunnel, which was filled with sand. Thus, trains for the M2 were disconnected from the rest of the network up to 1987 (trains were sent through the Bucharest Freight Railway Bypass), when another link tunnel was created at Piața Victoriei.
- 1 May 1987: During reconstruction work at Piața Unirii, the Dâmbovița was breached again, this time flooding both stations and forcing train circulation to cease for the next 5 days as a result. The flooding took place during a heavy rainstorm and during work on the Unirii Underpass (which was opened on 6 June 1987, after a record 34 days of work), when an excavator damaged a collecting canal of the Dâmbovița, flooding the underpass construction site, and subsequently, the M1 station. The M2 metro station was flooded due to an improperly sealed tube, designed for electric installations. At its peak, the flooding was 30 centimeters over the platforms, but further damages to the electrical transformers were avoided.
- 2 May 1987: During recovery from the flooding at Piața Unirii the previous day, the tunnel between Timpuri Noi and Mihai Bravu was found fully submerged by the Dâmbovița, possibly in relation to the previous incident. Signalling and other electrical cables were damaged, which further prolonged the repair efforts for the previous incident.
- 4 March 1996: The metro workers began a strike, demanding a 48% pay increase to offset inflation and better working conditions. It continued for at least 2 days, and was condemned by the Văcăroiu government as illegal.
- 17 November 2010: An IVA train derailed between Timpuri Noi and Piața Unirii.
- 14 January 2015: Due to a broken pipe, a fire started out at Tineretului station, leading to its closure for the rest of the day.
- 14 June 2016: Piața Victoriei was closed after huge amounts of smoke originated from the third rail.
- 20 January 2017: A fire, originating from electrical contactors, led to the evacuation of the Universitate station, subsequently leading to the closure of one of the tracks towards Piața Unirii.
- 16 August 2018: A train in Piața Unirii had to be evacuated, after someone began pepper-spraying the consist stopped in the station.
- 26 January 2019: A newly purchased CAF unit crashed in the Berceni depot. The train, which was stabled outside, was being shunted into the depot to prevent icing, however, due to software failure, it could not stop on time and crashed past the buffers. It is likely that the train could be scrapped since there is no way to remove it.
- 26 March 2021: A sudden strike, launched by the union of the metro employees began at 5 AM, effectively blocking the circulation of all trains. The dispute is related to the activity of commercial spaces within metro stations.
- 24 May 2022: 172 people were evacuated after a metro train that left from Piaţa Romană station heading to Berceni broke down.

Aside from these incidents, there have been other disruptions due to suicides at the metro. A recent one on 25 June 2019, led to the disruption of metro traffic at rush hour between Piața Unirii and Eroilor (the suicide took place at Izvor). Aside from that, in 2017, one woman was arrested for pushing a person in front of a train. These incidents led to criticism of METROREX, and suggestions to install platform screen doors or to increase security. Additionally, railfans reported harassment from security guards, being told "not to photograph in the stations".

Currently, the Bucharest Metro does not use platform screen doors. Debates about the opportunity of using platform screen doors have been going on for years, and testing of such doors has been taking place at Berceni metro station, but in 2024 authorities stated that it is uncertain whether platform screen doors will be installed, given concerns about financing and costs and benefits. Since all the stations of Bucharest Metro were inaugurated without having platform screen doors, installing such doors would require retrofitting, namely the process of installing platform screen doors on a system that was not initially designed to accommodate such doors, which may be complex and difficult, especially if the type installed were to be full-height doors (rather than half-height doors or rope-doors which are more common in retrofitting, but have limited benefits compared to full height doors).

== Miscellaneous ==
Bucharest Metro was the only one in the world that operated with passengers during testing.

In the 1980s, the speed of building the network (4 kilometers / year) placed the Bucharest Metro on the second place in the world, after Mexico City Metro.

The shortest distance between two adjacent stations is between Gara de Nord 2 (M4) and Basarab 2 (M4) and is 430 meters.

== See also ==
- List of Bucharest metro stations
- Bucharest Light rail
- Transport in Bucharest
- List of metro systems
- Rapid transit
