= Bucharest Metro Line M2 =

Metro line in Bucharest, Romania

Line M2

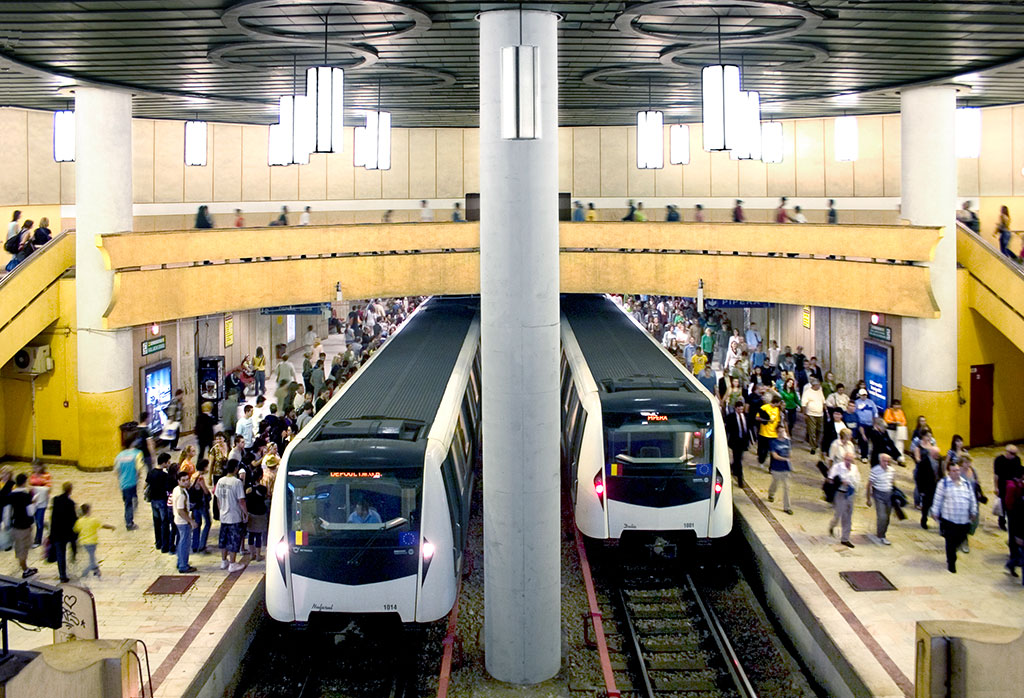
- M2 trains at Piața Victoriei station

Overview
- Status: Operational
- Termini: Tudor Arghezi; Pipera
- Stations: 15

Service
- Type: Rapid transit
- System: Bucharest Metro
- Operator: Metrorex S.A.
- Depot: IMGB
- Rolling stock: BM3 (CAF), Bombardier Movia 346 (2-3)
- Ridership: 69530000 (2019)

History
- Opened: 24 January 1986; 40 years ago
- Last extension: 2023

Technical
- Line length: 20.28 km (12.60 mi)
- Track gauge: 1,432 mm (4 ft 8 3/8 in)
- Electrification: 750 V DC third rail

M2 (20.28 km; 12.6 mi) is one of the five lines of metro of the Bucharest Metro. The M2 Line runs from Pipera to Tudor Arghezi, thus linking the north to the south of the city. The line is the busiest on the system, passing through a multitude of neighbourhoods, and also the only line to serve the centre of the city.

== History ==
The line was built during the 1980s when the industrial development in Romania was in full swing. A north-south metro line was crucial, seeing as other methods of public transport were very crowded and cars were very rare. As such the construction of this line was prioritised over others such as the M4, which was only completed recently. The building of the M2 line led to the removal in 1987 of the trolleybus lines linking Berceni to Băneasa; those lines, put in place in 1962, were made obsolete by the opening of the metro, according to the city planners at the time.

The M2 line was opened in two steps:

1. Berceni – Piața Unirii on 24 January 1986;
2. Piața Unirii – Pipera on 25 October 1987.

A unique station on the Bucharest Metro is Piața Romană, which was shelved from the initial plan. It was built after the opening of the line in 1987, and this can be noticed easily; the platforms are very narrow and the pillars are massive. The station opened on 28 November 1988.

As it stands now, the line is currently over capacity due to the massive amount of commuters using the line, and the gap left due to the removal of trolleybus lines. Additionally, the line's infrastructure has reached the end of its lifespan, and is prone to various incidents. Metrorex announced on 30 May 2019 that the line will undergo renovations over a 48-month period, although a beginning date on the works has yet to be announced.

=== Extensions ===
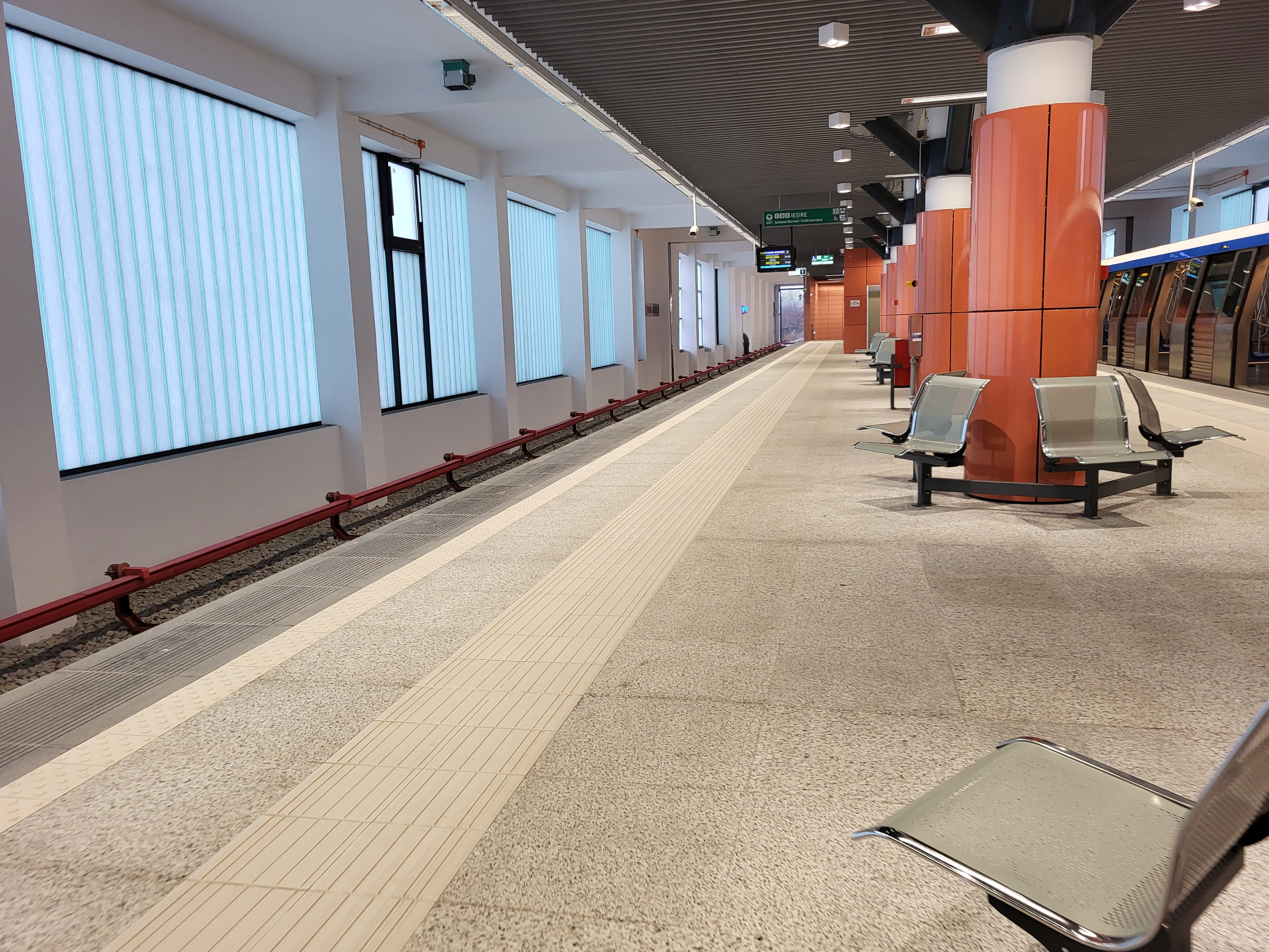
The Tudor Arghezi metro station is the last extension of M2 as well as the newest station of the Bucharest Metro

An at-grade extension toward the Bucharest South Ring Road, with a length of 1.6 km (1.0 mi) and one station, was approved in January 2020, and inaugurated on 15 November 2023. The name of the new station is Tudor Arghezi (after the writer Tudor Arghezi). The project also includes a park and ride facility with 600 parking sports.

The Berceni metro station and the Tudor Arghezi metro station are the only stations of the Bucharest Metro which are aboveground, with the short stretch between Dimitrie Leonida and Tudor Arghezi stations being the only portion of the Bucharest Metro that does not run underground.

== Rolling stock ==
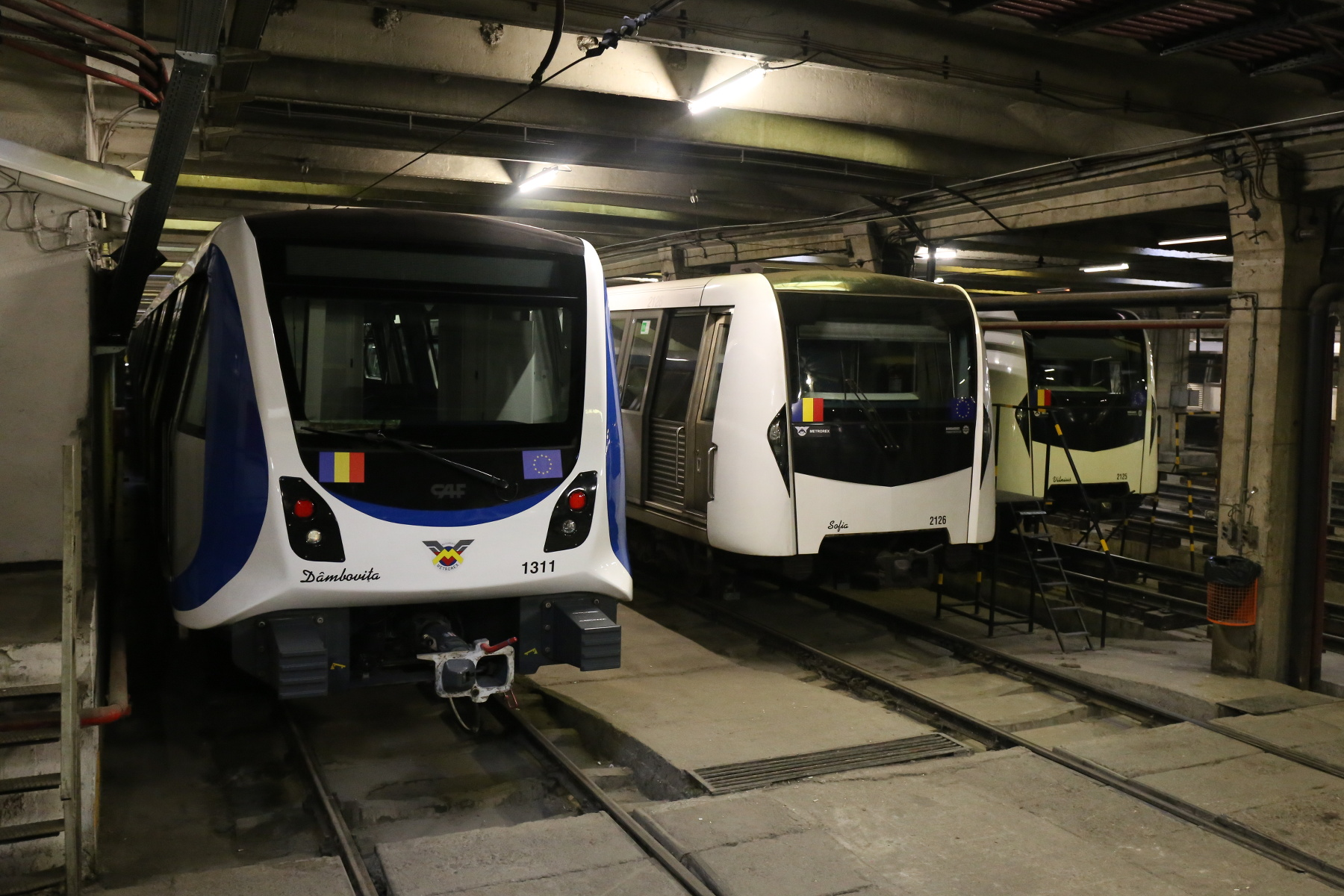
A CAF train on the left alongside two Movia trains on the right.

The M2 uses new, CAF trains. The CAF trains were bought in 2014 so that the Movia trains could run on the M1 and M3, replacing the old Astra IVA trains that were moved to the new line of M4.

== Name changes ==
Station	Previous name(s)	Years
Eroii Revoluției	Pieptănari	1986–1989
Dimitrie Leonida	IMGB	1987–2009
Berceni	Depoul IMGB	1987–2009
