= Piața Unirii metro station =

Bucharest metro station

M1 M2 M3 Piața Unirii
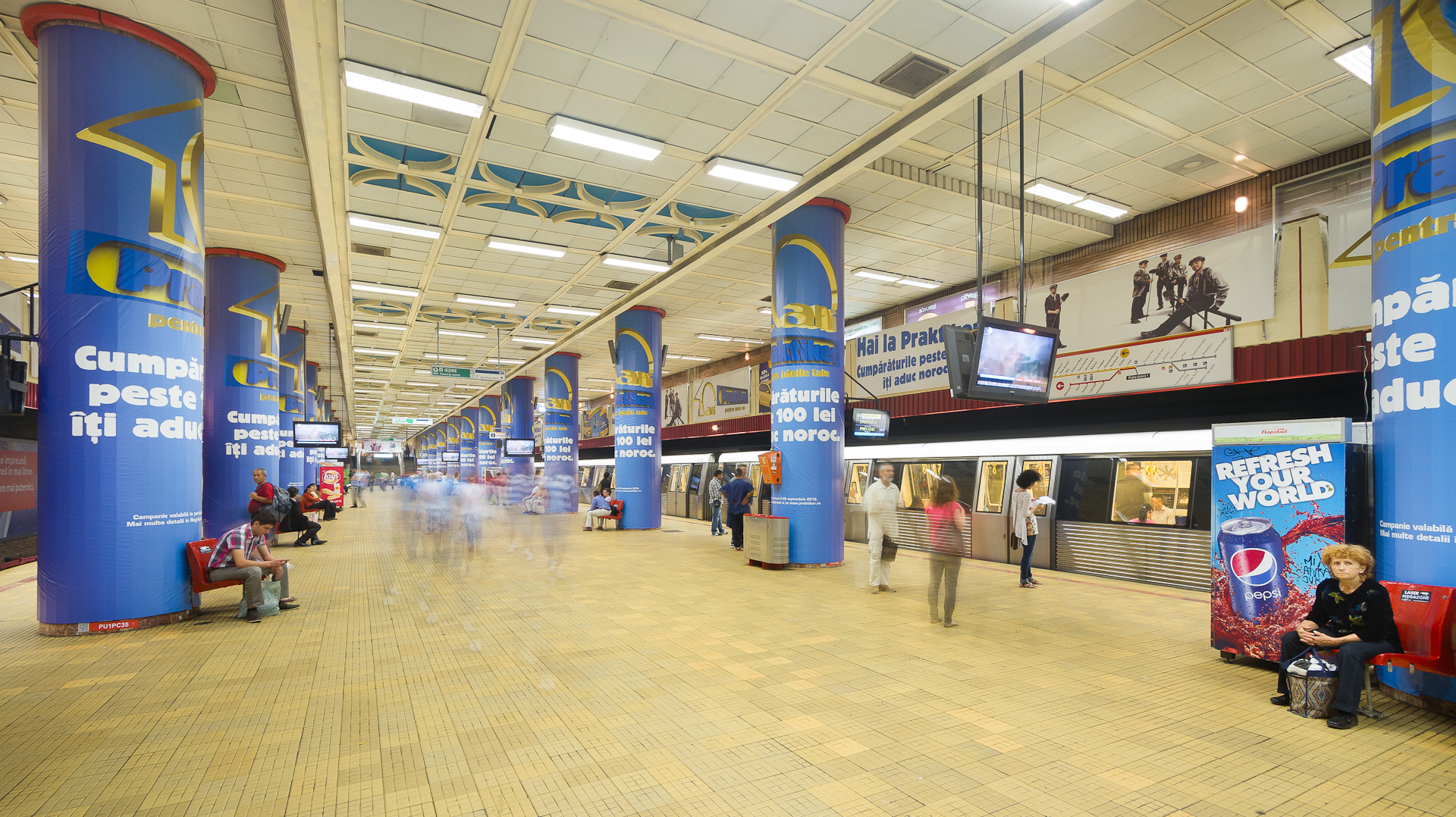
- Piața Unirii 1 in 2012

General information
- Location: Piața Unirii; Sector 3 and Sector 4, Bucharest; Romania
- Coordinates: 44.42774°N 26.10417°E
- Platforms: Two interconnected island platforms on different levels
- Tracks: 4
- Tram routes: 7, 27, 32, 47.
- Bus routes: 73, 100, 104, 116, 117, 123, 205, 312, 323, 385.

Construction
- Structure type: Underground

History
- Opened: 19 November 1979 (M1/M3); 24 January 1986 (M2)

Services
Preceding station	Bucharest Metro	Following station
Izvor towards Dristor 2	Line M1	Timpuri Noi towards Republica
Tineretului towards Tudor Arghezi	Line M2	Universitate towards Pipera
Izvor towards Preciziei	Line M3	Timpuri Noi towards Anghel Saligny
Location

Piața Unirii (Union Square) is a major metro station in Bucharest. It is located in the southern part of the city centre, in Union Square (Piața Unirii in Romanian), and it is one of the busiest stations of the Bucharest Metro. It is made up of two terminals, one on the M1 and M3 lines and another on the M2 line, linked by a passage. The M1/M3 station was opened on 19 November 1979 as part of the inaugural section of Bucharest Metro, between Semănătoarea and Timpuri Noi. The M2 station was opened on 24 January 1986 as part of the inaugural section of the line, from Piața Unirii to Depoul IMGB. On 24 October 1987, the line was extended north to Pipera.

A McDonald's fast-food restaurant is located in the vestibule above the M2 line platform. The station also features kiosks selling from newspapers to stationery, bakeries, a diversity of shops, public phones, a large transport police station (with a list of mugshots at the entrance) and mobile-phone servicing points. Due to the numerous entrances located in and around Piața Unirii square to the two metro terminals that make up the entire Piața Unirii station, it is located in Sectors 2, 3, 4, and 5 of Bucharest. The original entrances, opened in 1979 were shut off and replaced by newer ones around 1987, due to the reconstruction of the square. Nowadays some of them serve as service entrances, and from above-ground, they can be noticed by a narrow metal door.

== Incidents ==
The station was flooded twice.

The first time in 1983, a dyke was temporarily demolished in order to facilitate workings on the M2 station, however, a torrential rain subsequently led to the flooding of the M1 station, which was closed for some time, and the construction site of the M2 station, which was set back by the flood.

=== May 1987 flood ===
The second time, on 1 May 1987, the station was again flooded, when, during construction works on the nearby Unirii Underpass, an excavator breached a canal of the Dâmbovița. After another torrential rain, the river flooded the construction site on the underpass, which then leaked into the M1 station (at 20:30 hours), reaching up to 30 cm above the platforms, at 4:00 hours. The water damaged a number of electrical installations (cables, signals), and flooded service rooms. By midnight, multiple engineers and government officials surveyed the extent of the flood briefed at the station, trying to figure out what to do.

At 4:00, when the water level reached the maximum extent, the engineers decided to demolish a cofferdam further down on the river (located near the Mărășești underpass), in order to allow the water to flow freely and to reduce the flooding. Nicolae Ceaușescu visited the damaged station at 10:30; when asked when the stations will open, the engineers replied "likely by Tuesday morning". By this time, firemen and metro employees were operating and bringing in pumps to remove the water

Shortly after Ceaușescu left, a young man reported flooding into the M2 station downstairs, and 2 hours later, it was found that water was going through a tube designed for electrical cables. Later on, more pumps were brought out for the flooding in the second station. The breach was so grave, that further towards Timpuri Noi and Mihai Bravu, a section of the tunnel was fully submerged by water. The water on the M1 station was all cleared out by 7:00 hours on Sunday, at the same time, cleanup efforts began.

Because the canal that was breached mainly hosted wastewater, it left a horrible smell in the station, which further hampered cleanup efforts. By Wednesday, all the water in the tunnels and stations had been pumped out, and cleaning of the tunnels and various service rooms, replacement of damaged equipment and overhaul of the signals began. By Thursday morning, everything was back in working order. Worse damage was avoided – if the flooding continued, it would have damaged multiple transformers and the dispatcher office of the stations.
