= Pipera metro station =

Bucharest metro station

Coordinates: 44.4806°N 26.1165°E

Pipera
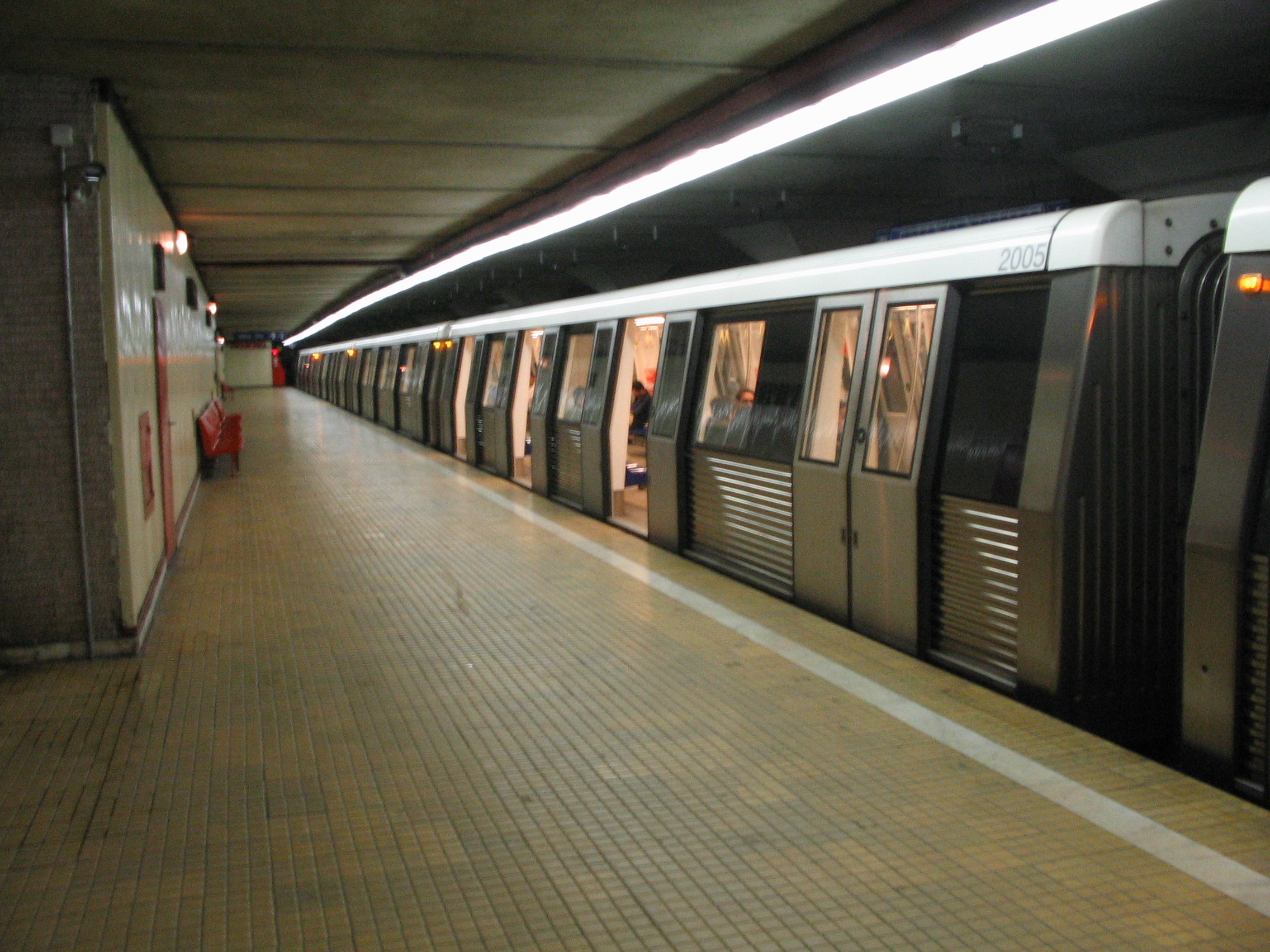

General information
- Location: Pipera; Sector 1, Bucharest; Romania
- Platforms: 2 side platforms
- Tracks: 2
- Bus routes: 290, 416, 450, 459, 488

Construction
- Structure type: Underground
- Accessible: Yes

History
- Opened: 24 October 1987

Services
| Preceding station | Bucharest Metro | Following station |
|---|---|---|
| Aurel Vlaicu towards Tudor Arghezi | Line M2 | Terminus |
Location

Pipera is a metro station in Bucharest, located in the Pipera district. Opened on 24 October 1987 as part of the M2 extension from Piața Unirii, it is the northern terminus of the line.

The initial scope of the station was to serve the large Pipera industrial estate. Since the end of industry in Romania however, the station is now used by the new business and residential estates established here.

RATB tram lines 16 and 36 stop outside the station building. Night bus N125 also stops here.

== Layout ==
The station has two side platforms. Northbound trains reverse in the sidings to the east of the station which can be seen from the platforms. To make room for them, southbound trains leave as northbound trains arrive.

Tunnel walls, as seen from the platforms, describe the life on Romanian pepper farmers, as depicted in the works of orthodox-traditionalist writer Gheorghe Pascovici. There are plans to add a permanent exhibition to the platform, celebrating the life of Romanian World War II fighter ace Captain Horia Agarici, who began his fighter pilot career at the nearby Pipera Airfield. Above platform level is a vestibule with a number of shops. This station has lifts for the disabled.
