= Tudor Arghezi metro station =

Metro station in Bucharest, Romania

Coordinates: 44°20′53″N 26°09′33″E

M2 Tudor Arghezi
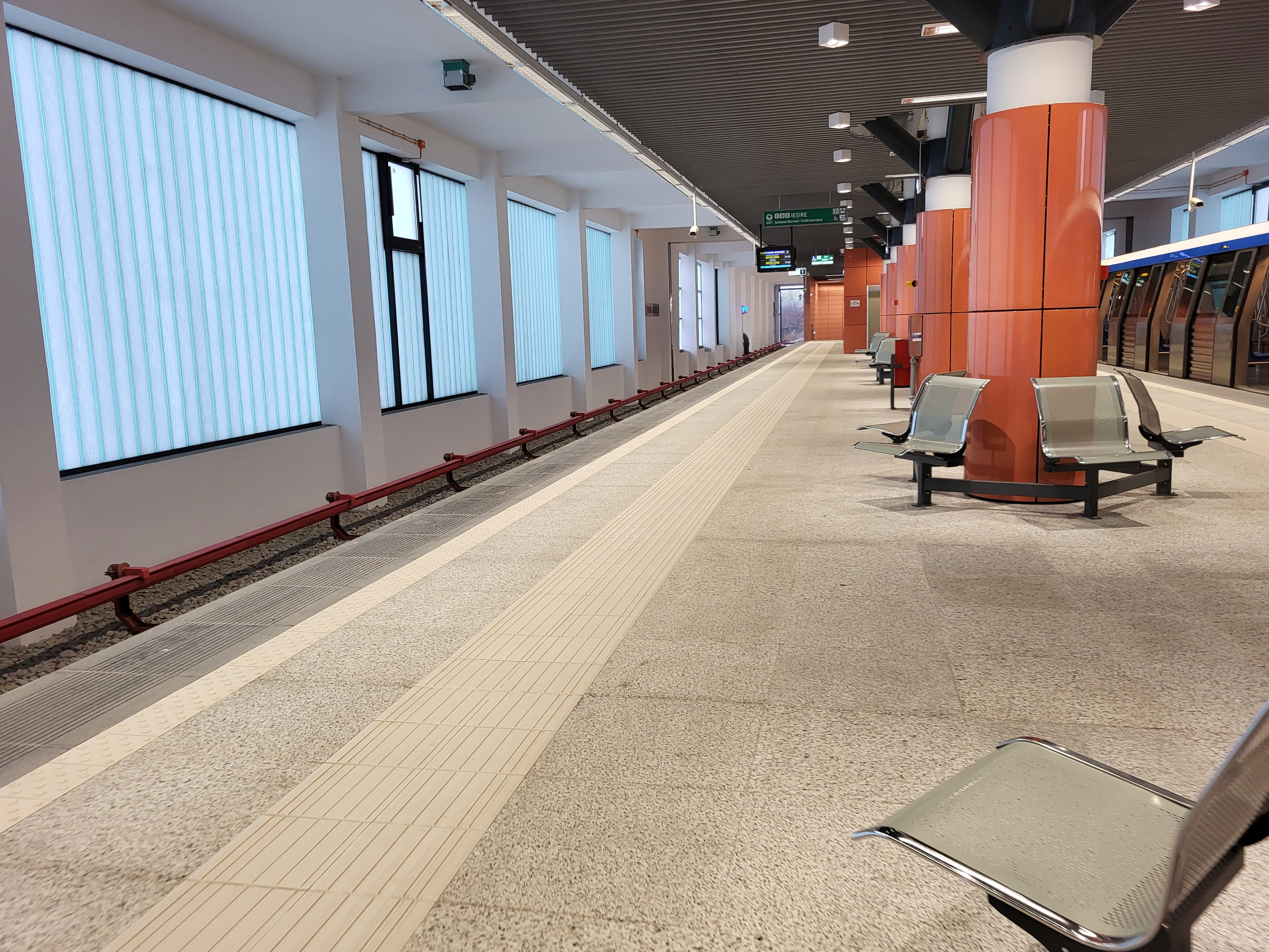
- Tudor Arghezi metro station

General information
- Location: Sector 4, Bucharest; Romania
- Operator: Metrorex
- Platforms: 1 island platform
- Tracks: 2
- Bus routes: STB: 125; STV: 438, 475

Construction
- Structure type: At-grade
- Accessible: Yes

History
- Opened: 15 November 2023

Passengers
- 388,000 (2024)

Services
Preceding station	Bucharest Metro	Following station
Terminus	Line M2	Berceni towards Pipera
Location

Tudor Arghezi (named after a Romanian writer) is a metro station in Bucharest, Romania. It was opened on 15 November 2023, being the newest station in the entire system, and the southern terminus of the M2 Line from Pipera.

The station features an at-grade enclosed Island platform with two tracks on each side where trains terminate and reverse back towards Pipera, with exits on both ends of the platform towards Șoseaua Olteniței. A Park & Ride facility also exists nearby, intended for use by commuters heading from Berceni (Commune) towards the city via the metro.

Unlike the other stations on the Bucharest Metro, the construction of this station was initiated by the local government of Sector 4 to support the future development of the area. The tender for the design and construction of the station was launched in September 2019, and the contract was awarded in April 2020 to a consortium led by the company Somet. The construction was worth 50 million euros.

Between 15 November 2023 and 8 May 2024, all services to Tudor Arghezi ran in a shuttle service from Berceni as the signalling and automatisation systems were not yet finished.
