= Sectors of Bucharest =

Administrative units of Bucharest, Romania

Coordinates: 44.4166°N 26.1000°E

The Municipality of Bucharest (the capital of Romania) is divided into 6 administrative units, named sectors (sectoare in Romanian), each of which has its own mayor and council, and has responsibility over local affairs, such as secondary streets, parks, schools and the cleaning services.

Each of the 6 sectors contains a number of informal districts (cartiere) which have no administrative function:

- Sector 1: Dorobanți, Băneasa, Aviației, Pipera, Aviatorilor, Primăverii, Romană, Victoriei, Herăstrău, Bucureștii Noi, Dămăroaia, Străulești, Chitila, Grivița, 1 Mai, Pajura, Domenii, and a small part of Giulești – the part with Giulești Stadium
- Sector 2: Pantelimon, Colentina, Iancului, Tei, Floreasca, Moșilor, Obor, Vatra Luminoasă, Fundeni, Ștefan cel Mare
- Sector 3: Vitan, Dudești, Titan, Centrul Civic, Balta Albă, Dristor, Lipscani, Muncii, Unirii
- Sector 4: Berceni, Olteniței, Văcărești, Timpuri Noi, Tineretului, Progresul
- Sector 5: Rahova, Ferentari, Giurgiului, Cotroceni, 13 Septembrie, Dealul Spirii, Odăi
- Sector 6: Giulești, Crângași, Drumul Taberei, Militari, Regie (also known as Grozăvești), Ghencea

== History ==
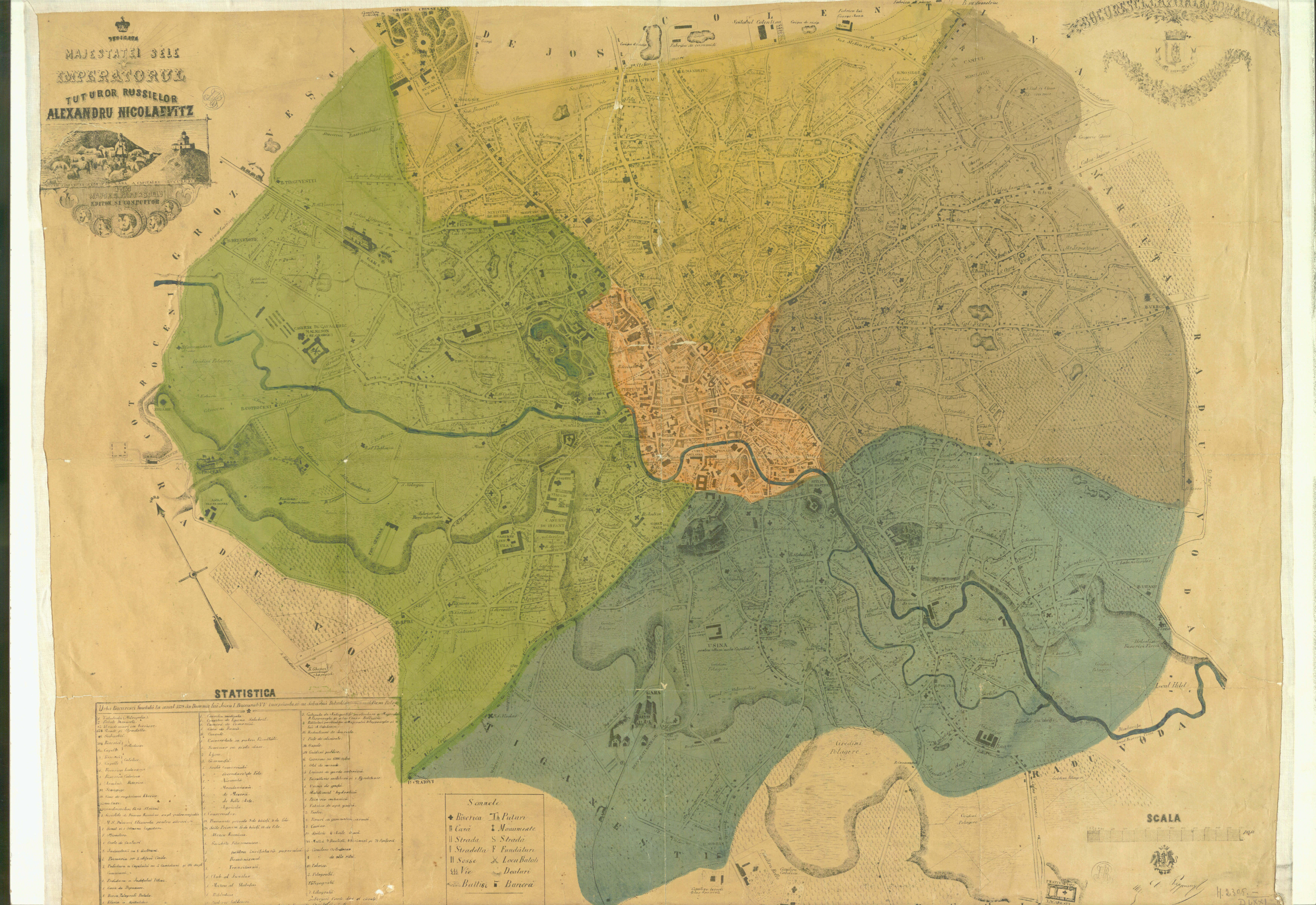
The five culori in 1871

Initially, Bucharest was divided into plăși. In 1798, there were five of these: Târgul, Podul Mogoșoaiei, Târgul de afară, Broștenii and Gorganul. During the Russo-Turkish War (1806-1812), these were given the names of colors (Roșu - Red; Galben - Yellow; Negru - Black; Albastru - Blue and Verde - Green) and called culori ("colors"). Roșu, the smallest, composed of the commercial center and a narrow strip on the right bank of the Dâmbovița River, was disbanded at the beginning of the 20th century, its territory divided among the other four. After World War I, each of the four culori, also called sectoare by this time, was given its own mayor and council. At the beginning of Ion Antonescu's regime, the culori were briefly abolished but restored several months later.

In 1950, soon after the onset of the Communist regime, the culori were abolished and replaced by eight raions, each with its own local administration:

1. I.V. Stalin (later 30 Decembrie)
2. 1 Mai
3. 23 August
4. Tudor Vladimirescu
5. Nicolae Bălcescu
6. V.I. Lenin
7. Gh. Gheorghiu Dej (later 16 Februarie)
8. Grivița Roșie

In 1968, the raions became sectors, their names replaced by cardinal numbers. In 1979, Sector 8 was merged into Sector 1 and Sector 2 into Sector 3, yielding the present six sectors.

== List of sectors by area ==
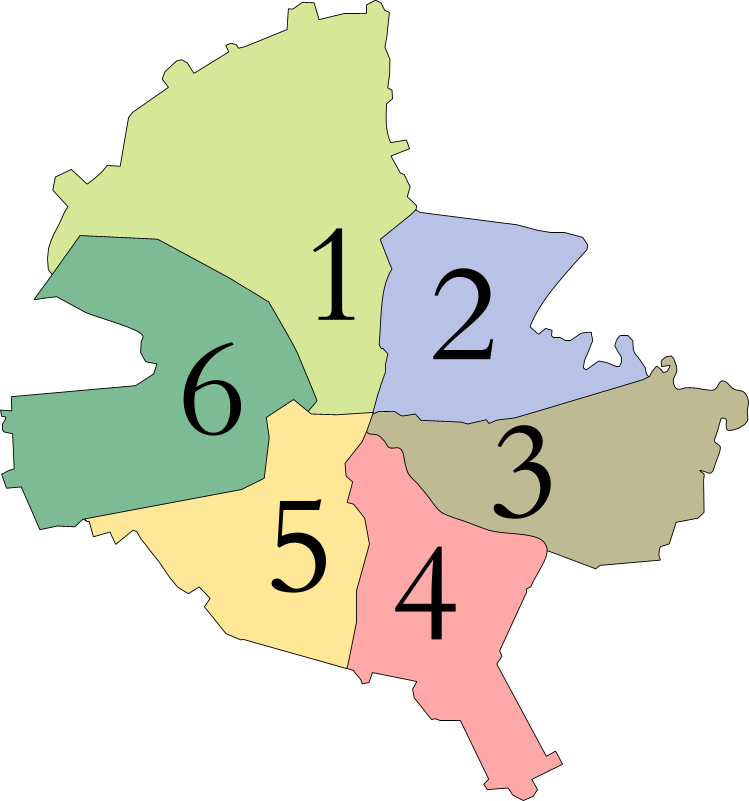
The six sectors

Rank	Sector	Area (km^{2})
1	Sector 1	68
2	Sector 6	38
3	Sector 3	34
4	Sector 4	34
5	Sector 2	32
6	Sector 5	30

== List of sectors by population ==
Rank	Sector	Population (October 2011)
1	Sector 3	385,439
2	Sector 6	367,760
3	Sector 2	345,370
4	Sector 4	287,828
5	Sector 5	271,575
6	Sector 1	225,454

== List of sectors by population density ==
Rank	Sector	Population density (inhabitants/km^{2})
1	Sector 3	11,336
2	Sector 2	10,793
3	Sector 6	9,678
4	Sector 5	9,053
5	Sector 4	8,466
6	Sector 1	3,340
