= Tineretului (disambiguation) =

Tineretului means youth in Romanian.

Tineretului may also refer to:

- Tineretului - a neighborhood in Bucharest
- Tineretului statue - a monument
- Tineretului Park - a recreational space in Bucharest
- Tineretului metro station - in Bucharest

== Stadiums ==
- Stadionul Tineretului (Urziceni)
- Stadionul Silviu Ploieşteanu (previously known as Stadionul Tineretului)
- Stadionul Arcul de Triumf (also known as Stadionul Tineretului)
