= Lichtenhagen riots =

1992 race riots in Rostock, Germany

Coordinates: 54.153°N 12.066°E

- Lichtenhagen in relation to Rostock
- Date: 22–24 August 1992
- Location: Lichtenhagen, Rostock, Germany
- Caused by: Living conditions within the Central Refugee Shelter; Racial tensions
- Methods: Rioting, Assault, Arson
- Result: Riots suppressed

Parties
German rioters: White youth; Street gangs (Skinheads, Hooligans); Right-wing groups	Government of Germany: Landespolizei; Federal Border Patrol

Number
2,000	2,050

Casualties
- Injuries: 204
- Arrested: 370

Violent xenophobic riots took place in the Lichtenhagen district of Rostock, Germany, from 22–24 August 1992. These were the worst mob attacks against migrants in postwar Germany. Attackers threw stones and petrol bombs at an apartment block where asylum seekers lived. At the height of the riots, several hundred militant right-wing extremists were involved, and about 3,000 neighbourhood onlookers stood by, applauding them.

The initial response of authorities and politicians was strongly criticised. For some days prior to the riots, veiled warnings of impending trouble had been posted in some newspapers. Police and politicians seemed reluctant to respond and, when they did, their responses were considered inadequate. Outside the building where refugees were housed, several hundred asylum seekers had been camping for days with little or no access to basic facilities. This was contributing to escalating tensions in the neighbourhood.

Between 22 and 26 August 1992, authorities made 370 provisional arrests and 408 preliminary investigations related to the riots. Among those arrested were 110 people from the former West Germany; 217 from the state of Mecklenburg-Vorpommern, including 147 from Rostock; and another 37 from the former East Germany. During the riot, 204 police officers were injured. No one was killed.

== Background ==
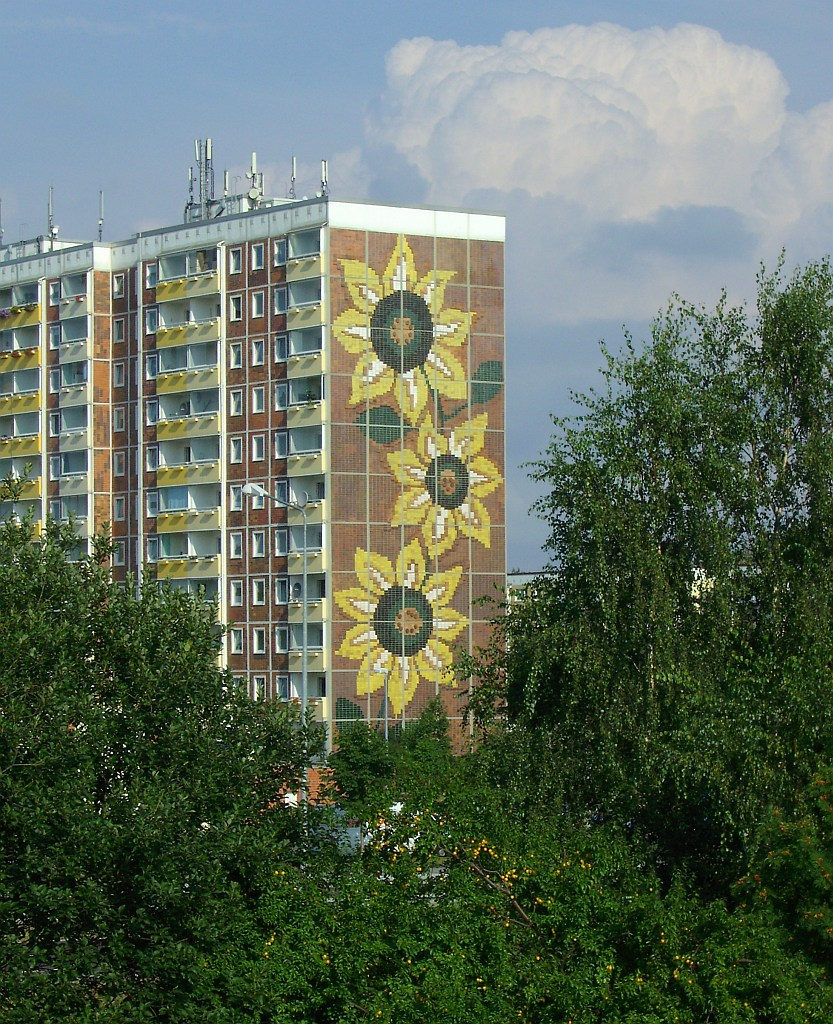
The Sunflower Tower

The Zentrale Aufnahmestelle für Asylbewerber für Mecklenburg-Vorpommern (ZAst M-V), or "Central Refugee Shelter" for the state of Mecklenburg-Vorpommern, was in an 11-storey plattenbau apartment complex known as the "Sunflower House" or "Sunflower Tower", because of the large sunflowers decorating one side. The building was notorious for the inhumane conditions under which the asylum seekers were living and the lack of support (if any) provided for them. Authorities had ignored numerous complaints from citizens and residents over the filthy and deplorable conditions in the apartment building.

=== Rioting ===
The shelter was originally intended to house 300 refugees a month, but by summer 1992 it was averaging 11,500 refugees per month. Primarily Roma from Romania, many were forced by lack of room in the building to camp out in front for days at a time.

The municipal government refused to provide portable toilets, and there was no water or garbage collection. Clashes between the homeless migrants and the Lichtenhagen residents increased. Neither the city nor the state government took action.

For days before the riots, the newspapers Norddeutsche Neueste Nachrichten and Ostsee-Zeitung had been calling for a "Lichtenhagen interest group". There were anonymous warnings that if by the weekend, the refugee shelter was not "cleaned up," order would be made. This gave young gang members from every corner of Rostock, normally enemies, a date, place and purpose to congregate. One 19-year-old skinhead said, "The police know the Rostock Skins and 'Hools' [hooligans]. When something like this is announced, we're there!"

The first day's riot started with young people from the neighbourhood throwing stones. This was contained by the police, but media coverage encouraged neo-Nazis to roam the area. By day three, a xenophobic mob outnumbered the police. After officials evacuated the Sunflower building on the second day, the mob stormed a neighbouring building in which 115 Vietnamese immigrants, a social worker, and a ZDF television crew had mistakenly been left behind. While the building burned, they barricaded their doors against rioters, who were climbing over the balconies armed with baseball bats and Molotov cocktails. Below, a mob of over 3,000 spectators eagerly watched and applauded.

Charges of police and political incompetence were levelled from the beginning. One explanation cited for the lack of effective action by the police was that they were reluctant to take any action which might have been reminiscent of the recently cast-off communist police state. There were also charges that police and politicians were privately sympathetic to the anti-migrant sentiment.

The first major conviction relating to the riots was on 4 March 1993; some 24 people had already been convicted on lesser charges. In 1993 a 22-year-old man was convicted of throwing a firebomb at police, of seriously disturbing the peace, violating weapons laws and attempting bodily harm. An attempted murder charge was dropped for lack of evidence. Critics complained that no one was convicted of assaulting a foreigner, only of assaulting the police or of disorderliness. It took almost ten years to complete prosecution of 408 people.

The following timeline was reconstructed by the "Legislative Committee to Investigate the Refugee Shelter Incident" ("Parlamentarischer Untersuchungsausschuss zu den Ereignissen um die ZAst").

== Timeline ==
22 August, Day 1

From about 6:00 p.m. a large crowd assembled in front of the refugee shelter. At 8:02 p.m., thugs started attacking the shelter and violence escalated quickly. By 10:46 p.m., police were forced to retreat from the area. At 11:02 p.m. riot police arrived on the scene and were attacked with Molotov cocktails. At 11:24 p.m. another police unit arrived from Schwerin. At 1:34 a.m. water cannons were set up and put to continuous use. Between 1:34 and 2:34 a.m., the rioters were pushed towards the autobahn. At 2:25 a.m. a water cannon vehicle was set on fire by a Molotov cocktail. At 2:30 a.m. Rostock police command declared a police emergency and the armoury was opened. Officers were issued tear gas and fired at the crowd. The situation calmed down by 5:30 a.m.

Day 1 Statistics: 160 police officers, 300 rioters, 13 police officers injured, nine arrests.

23 August, Day 2, Part 1

100 people gathered in front of the shelter. At 11:15 a.m. Rostock police department requested back-up from other police departments. Squads responded from Schwerin, Anklam, Stralsund and Güstrow. The Landespolizei force of the state of Mecklenburg-Vorpommern sent two additional water cannons. Two reserve units (Einsatzhundertschaften) from the Federal Border Patrol (Bundesgrenzschutz) were activated. At 2:15 p.m. plainclothes officers reported the arrival of 30 known neo-Nazis in the area.

23 August, Day 2, Part 2

At 6:45 p.m. about 400 rioters started attacking the shelter. At 7:18 p.m. the rioters started throwing Molotov cocktails. 8:00 p.m. The police used water cannons to clear the area. At 8:30 p.m. police resorted to firing live ammunition. At 10:00 p.m. the police officer in charge reported that without reinforcements, within 30 minutes, the situation would be impossible to control. At 10:30 p.m. a police car was set on fire. At 10:41 p.m. state police declared a state of emergency (Landespolizeialarm).

The state level of emergency allowed for additional federal brigades to be called in. Hamburg sent out its SWAT (SEK and MBK) units. These riot police units of about 100 officers each were reinforced by two police dog squads from Kiel, a reserve unit from Lübeck, and helicopters from the federal police.

At 2:55 a.m. the second Hamburg unit arrived on the scene. At 3:45 a.m. the first Hamburg unit arrived. At 4:10 a.m. the situation quieted down. The Hamburg units took over the night watch.

Day 2 Statistics: 850 police officers, 500 rioters, 70 police officers injured, 130 arrests.

24 August, Day 3, Part 1

2:00 p.m. Under the protection of the Hamburg units (now 16 hours in action), the shelter was evacuated. The large crowd of onlookers gave notice of a melee at 4:00 p.m. The police learned of a telephone network that hooligans were using to organize the melee, which was to attack the police exclusively if the shelter was cleared out.

24 August, Day 3, Part 2

7:45 p.m. Reinforcements from the 4th Brigade, Mecklenburg-Vorpommern arrived to replace the Hamburg riot units, now in action for 21 hours. 7:55 p.m. Ten minutes after the replacements arrived, an order was given to withdraw all protection for the shelter.

At 8:00 p.m. during the retreat from the building, Federal Border Patrol units reinforcing the second Hamburg unit came under attack. At this point, the crowd of cheering onlookers had grown to about 3,000. At 8:05 p.m. squads from the second Hamburg unit, which had already left the scene, were ordered back to reinforce the Border Patrol unit under attack. In order to push through the crowd, they resorted to using batons. The commanding officer of the first Hamburg unit reported that the threat of violence was higher than what he had seen in his five years of experience in Hamburg's rioting hotspots, Hafenstraße and Flora.

At 8:15 p.m. The first Hamburg unit and the 4th Brigade MV reached the other units. Water cannons were used and police cordons were formed. Rail transport police were radioed for back-up. The alarm was "Officers in distress." The first Hamburg unit also provided support.

At 8:40 p.m. a technical problem knocked out one water cannon. At 9:20 p.m. the retreating first Hamburg unit sought cover from the water cannon of the 4th Brigade MV. At 9:34 p.m. The water supply of the second cannon ran out. The 4th Brigade MV of about 100 men was up against 800 rioters. At 10:37 p.m. the 4th Brigade MV formed a police cordon and aimed the water cannon at the crowd to allow the fire department to get through. At 10:55 p.m. the first Hamburg unit was sent back to Hamburg after 25 hours of duty. At midnight the 4th Brigade MV began clearing out the remaining roughly 300 hooligans, while the second Hamburg unit was sent back to Hamburg after 26 hours of duty. At 12:30 a.m. the area settled down.

At 2:00 a.m. 400 hooligans again began to storm the refugee shelter, using every means possible. The police had a strong presence and up to 7 water cannons were used to clear the streets surrounding the apartment complex. About 1,000–1,200 rioters took part in the melee with the police. By 3:00 a.m., the situation was under control.

Day 3 Statistics: 2050 police officers, 2000 rioters, 117 police officers injured, 58 arrests.

Copycat acts

In the week after the riots in Rostock, neo-Nazis attacked 40 residences with firebombs and stones, and fought street battles with the police. In Mecklenburg-Western Pomerania in the following few days, the asylum centers in Wismar, Rostock-Hinrichshagen, Lübz, and Neubrandenburg were attacked, and there were three such incidents in Greifswald. In Wismar there was a six-day riot between 15 and 20 September in front of the asylum center, where, as in Lichtenhagen, there was applause from local residents. Even after that, there were attacks almost daily. On one weekend between Friday 18 September and Sunday 20 September, asylum centers in Güstrow, Ueckermünde, Kröpelin, Schwarzendorf (in the district of Malchin), Schwerin, Wismar, and Retschow were repeatedly attacked with Molotov cocktails.

Legal proceedings

The attacks led to 370 arrests and 408 preliminary investigations. Prosecutions proved very difficult, as there was little reliable evidence. Overall, the legal process was judged to have been remarkably slow and consequences mild.

Cases were brought before the Regional Court of Rostock against 257 persons, most of which were dropped. Only 40 young people in 1993/94 were charged with rioting and arson. Most were given fines and suspended sentences. Eleven of those convicted were sent into youth custody ranging from seven months to three years, but only four of them were actually incarcerated between two and three years; the other seven sentences were suspended. It took ten years after the riots for the last three cases to be concluded. The sentences were for 12 to 18 months in juvenile detention, or probation, although the then 17-, 18- and 19-year-olds convicted of assault were sentenced not only for arson, but for attempted murder. The vast majority of those involved in the rioting remained anonymous and unpunished, despite the whole three days of rioting having been filmed by national German television, by the BBC, and other foreign news broadcasters.

An investigation against Rostock police chief Siegfried Kordus was discontinued in 1994. A case was made against the leader of the police operation, Chief Superintendent Jürgen Deckert for criminally negligent arson by omission, but the case was dropped in 2000.

== Media ==
- Mark Saunders. "The Truth Lies in Rostock (AVI, 698,7 MB)]" (BRD, Great Britain, 78 min.) / 1993 von Mark Saunders & Siobhan Cleary – 121 min
- Wir Sind Jung. Wir Sind Stark (We Are Young. We Are Strong), a 2014 film based on the riots

== See also ==
- Riot of Hoyerswerda, 1991 xenophobic riots of neo-Nazis attacking Vietnamese
- Solingen arson attack of 1993
- 1993 Hădăreni riots of Romanians and Hungarians against Roma
- 2006 Ferentari riot
