= Tineretului =

Coordinates: 44°24′43″N 26°06′48″E

Tineretului on the map of Bucharest

Tineretului is a small (0.62 km^{2} (0.24 sq mi)) neighborhood in south Bucharest, Romania in Sector 4, close to the city center, named after the nearby Tineretului Park. It is one of the preferred neighborhoods by people seeking to buy an apartment. This is due to the well established public transportation (two metro lines, bus and tram routes), two nearby parks; along with banks, commercial spaces and schools. In 2015 there were 17,981 people registered living in this area.

== History ==
Prior to the 1960s, this area was mostly characterized by empty lands and a couple of slums, the most known of which is the Cocioc slum. Interest in the area begun in the 1960s when a new road that linked North Bucharest to the South was constructed under the name Magistrala Nord–Sud (North–South Axis), providing a direct route from Piața Unirii to Șerban Vodă Avenue. The road was later renamed Dimitrie Cantemir Boulevard. The local park, Tineretului Park, was built between 1965 and 1974. This led to a fast urbanization of the area. Because the park was arranged and cleaned by young volunteers from schools and factories (Communist propaganda) it was named Parcul Tineretului literally meaning Youth Park.

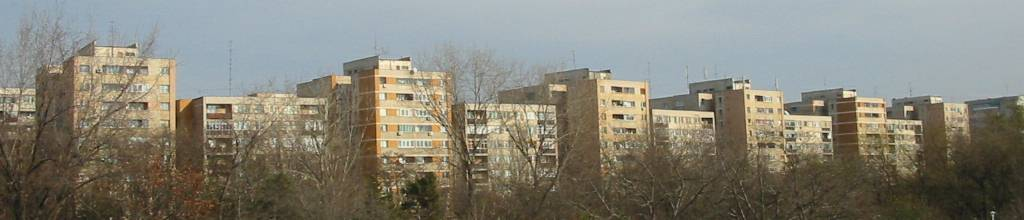
Blocks A1–A6 (lower) and Z1–Z7 (taller), 2004

The first apartment buildings in the area were 4-storey ones built in 1961–1962, simultaneous with the North–South Axis. Starting with 1973, construction began on Bulevardul Tineretului as part of an ongoing slum clearance effort and in 1974 the first tower buildings (blocks A1–A6 and Z1–Z7) were handed over to their residents and by 1979 the first phase of buildings were completed. Beginning with 1981, the second phase of construction began, which led to the demolition of most of the old houses in the area, and other drastic changes to the local cityscape (such as the widening of Gheorghe Șincai Street on the former placement of Lânăriei street and the relocation of the Timpuri Noi Bridge). Further development resulted in the demolition of all old buildings on Văcărești Avenue between the Mihai Bravu Bridge and the Berceni housing estate. Simultaneously, the Tineretului Park was expanded on the land previously occupied by old housing and the National Palace of the Children was built. The alignment of Bulevardul Tineretului was slightly changed during this time, leading to the housing estate becoming smaller on plans for unexplained reasons. Very few pre-systematization buildings survive in the area to this day.

== Transportation ==
The area is served by Tineretului, Piata Sudului, and Constantin Brâncoveanu metro stations. Busses that go through the area include 381, 313, 312, and 116. Trolleybuses ran on Văcărești Avenue since 1965 and on Bulevardul Tineretului since 1976, before being removed in 1987. Trolleybus service was reinstated in 2009 with line 76 before being suspended from 2011 to 2017, after which all the trolleybus lines in the area (73, 74, 76) link the Berceni housing estate with Piața Unirii. Tram lines also serve the area, the first of which was line 1 (Colentina–Splaiul Unirii Depot) beginning with the 1950s, being followed by an extension from Dristor to the Mihai Bravu Bridge in the mid 1960s. The line was extended in 1984 from the depot to the Berceni roundabout, which extended line 34's route from Gara de Nord to IMGB, but in 1987 the line on Splaiul Unirii along with the depot was closed and dismantled. Today the Asmita Gardens complex stands on the site of the former tram depot.
