= Lake Tineretului =

Anthropic lake in Bucharest, Romania

Lake Tineretului Lacul Tineretului
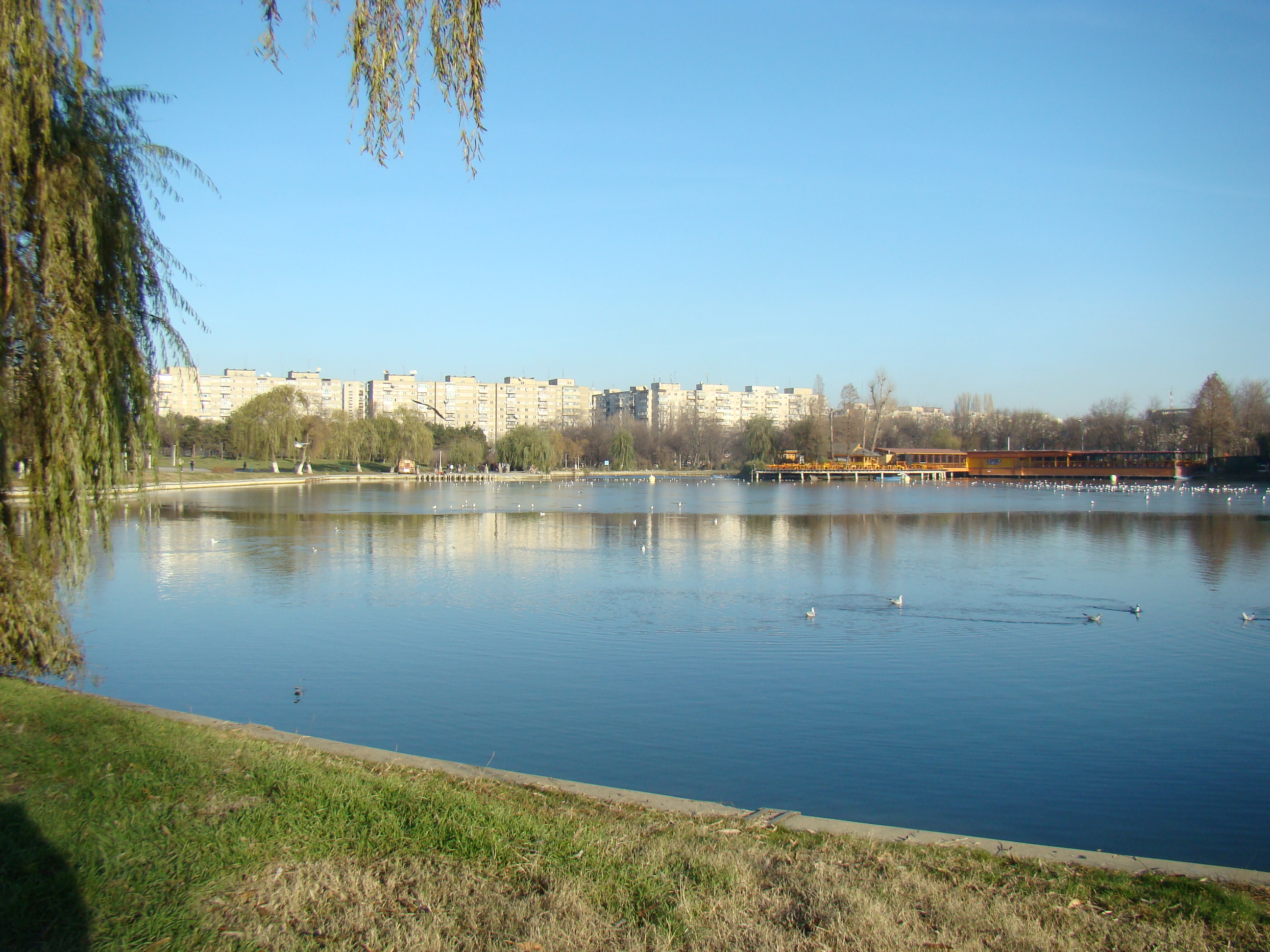
- The lake in 2010

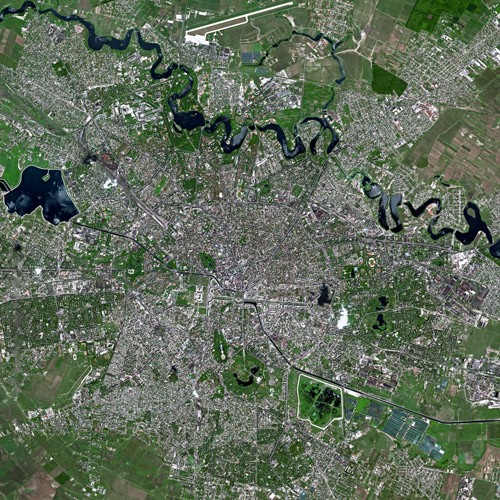
- Location within Bucharest, Romania
- Location: Sector 4, Bucharest
- Coordinates: 44.4041°N 26.1063°E
- Basin countries: Romania
- Max. length: 3 km (1.9 mi)
- Max. width: 500 m (1,600 ft)
- Surface area: 13 ha (32 acres)
- Max. depth: 2.2 m (7 ft 3 in)
- Water volume: 16,000,000 m^{3} (13,000 acre⋅ft)
- Islands: 3

Lake Tineretului is an anthropic lake located in Bucharest, Sector 4, situated in Tineretului Park, covering an area of 13 hectares. The park's designer, Valentin Donose, proposed the creation of a large lake, naturally fed by the groundwater, featuring three islands, two of which are connected to the shore by small bridges. The lake is monitored by birdwatchers from Bucharest due to the presence of rare bird species that use the area for feeding or resting during migrations and winter.

== See also ==
- List of lakes in Bucharest
