= Văcărești Nature Park =

Nature park in Bucharest, Romania

- Parcul Natural Văcărești
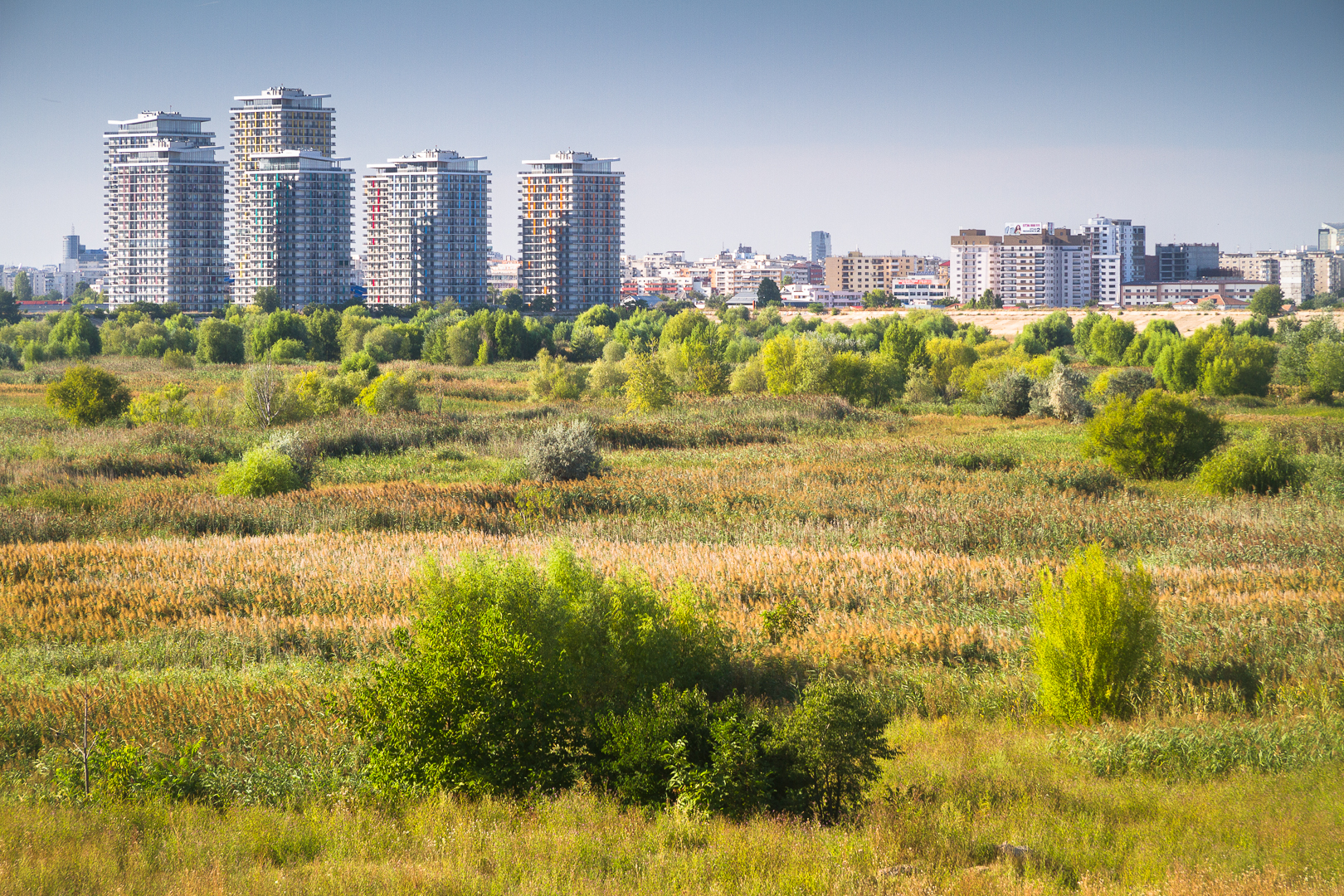
- Văcărești Park with Bucharest apartment buildings in the background
- Interactive map of Văcărești Nature Park
- Type: Urban park
- Location: Sector 4, Bucharest, Romania
- Coordinates: 44.3996°N 26.1342°E
- Area: 190 hectares (470 acres)
- Established: 2016
- Status: Open year-round

Văcărești Nature Park (Romanian: Parcul Natural Văcărești) is a nature park located in Sector 4 of Bucharest, Romania, containing the wetlands surrounding Lake Văcărești.

== History ==
Having 190 hectares (470 acres), the area where the park stands was part of a large swampy area on the outskirts of Bucharest. To its west was the area known as the "valley of weeping" that was the rubbish dump of interbellum Bucharest.

Much of the swampy area surrounding the park was drained by Communist Romania, building a neighbourhood of apartment blocks, while the "valley of weeping" became Tineretului Park.

President Nicolae Ceaușescu wanted to build a reservoir which was supposed to be filled from the Argeș River via the Mihăilești Lake. As such, a concrete dam was built to surround the lake. The few modest houses located in this area were bought by the state and demolished. The plans for development were abandoned when communism fell and the area was overtaken by nature.

In 2003, the Ministry of the Environment concessioned the area for 49 years to the Royal Romanian Corporation for USD 6 million. The company was supposed to invest over a billion dollars in a sports-culture complex; however, it did not honor its part of the contract.

Due to the area being unused for such a long period of time, plant-life and wildlife flourished within the confines of the dam. The biodiversity now encountered here is considered by some to be comparable to that of a small river delta. A 2013 study counted hundreds of species of plants and 96 different species of birds.

On June 5, 2014, the Lake Văcărești zone was declared a protected nature area and named Văcărești Nature Park by the Government of Romania.

Văcărești Nature Park was the setting for Radu Ciorniciuc's 2020 documentary Acasă, My Home, following a family that lived in the park for 20 years.
