= Stadionul Tineretului =

Stadionul Tineretului may refer to:

- Stadionul Tineretului (Lugoj)
- Stadionul Tineretului (Oradea)
- Stadionul Tineretului (Urziceni)
- Stadionul Silviu Ploieşteanu (previously known as Stadionul Tineretului)
- Stadionul Arcul de Triumf (also known as Stadionul Tineretului)

== See also ==
Tineretului (disambiguation)
