= Grand Arena Mall =

Grand Arena
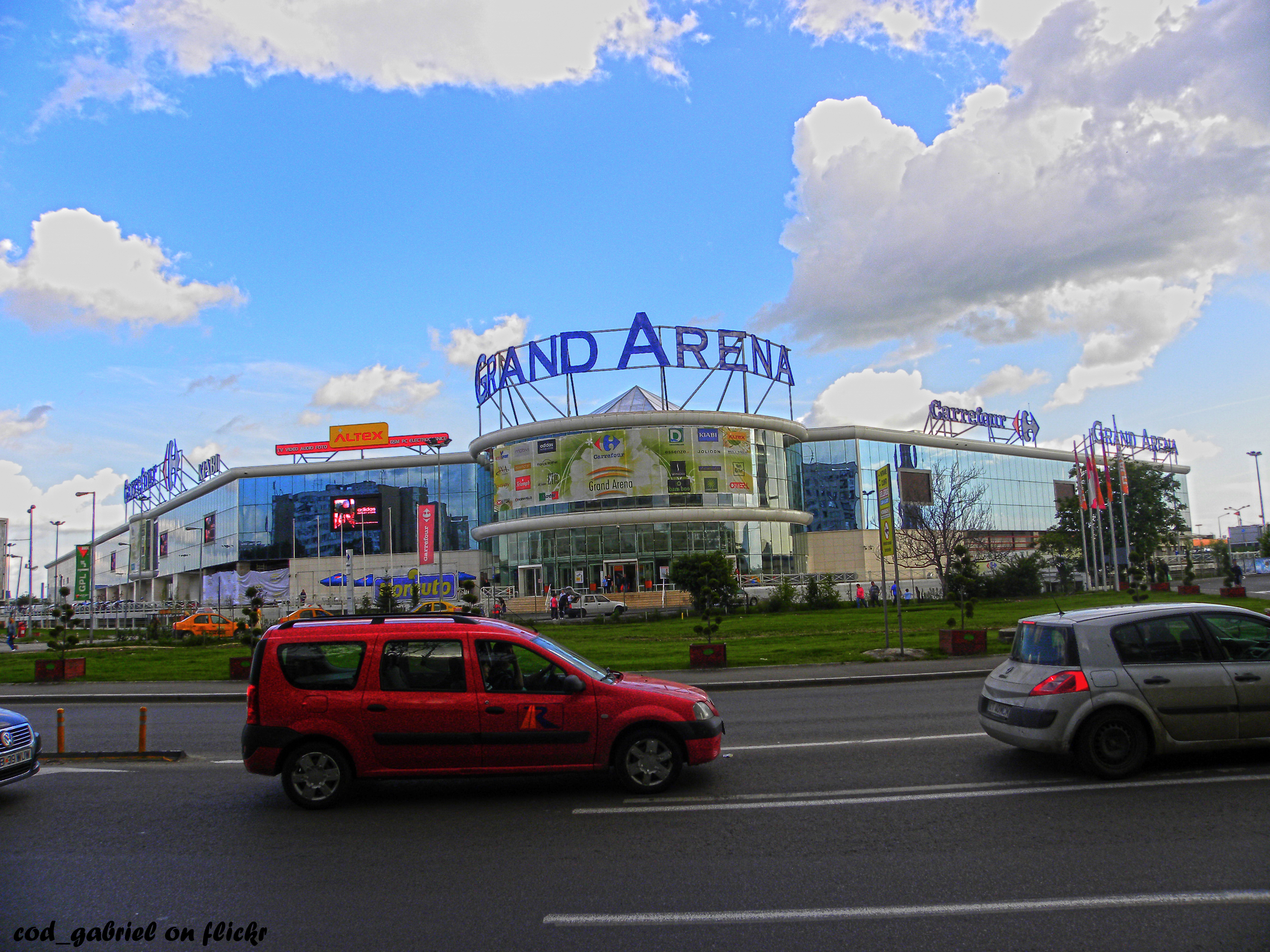
- Location: Bucharest, Romania
- Coordinates: 44.37453°N 26.118965°E
- Opened: March 25, 2009
- Num. of stores: Approximately 100
- Floor area: 50,000 square metres (538,196 sq ft)
- Floors: 2
- Parking: 2,000 underground

Grand Arena is located south of Bucharest in Berceni district, at the crossroad between Turnu Măgurele Street, Metalurgiei Boulevard and Gilăului Road, in the proximity of a large do-it-yourself store and cash and carry.

It is anchored by Carrefour Hypermarket and it is served by an underground parking lot with approximately 2,000 car places.
