= Acasă, My Home =

2020 documentary film by Radu Ciorniciuc

- Directed by: Radu Ciorniciuc
- Release date: 2020
- Countries: Romania, Germany, Finland

Acasă, My Home is a 2020 German/Romanian/Finnish documentary film directed by Radu Ciorniciuc. The film is about nine children and their parents who lived in harmony with nature in the wilderness of the Bucharest Delta for 20 years until they are chased out and forced to adapt to life in the big city. It was filmed in the course of 4 years, with production starting in 2016. As the movie progresses, it follows the evolution of the family’s life throughout the years of living in the capital. “The 11 family members lived in isolation from society: without documents, without education or access to health care. Now, all nine children in the Enache family have documents, go to school, are seen regularly by doctors, and adults have stable jobs.”

It had its world premiere at the 2020 Sundance Film Festival on January 27, 2020. It runs for 1 hour 26 minutes. It is in Romanian with English subtitles. It was produced by Autlook films. Zeitgeist Films, Kino Lorber took the North American international distribution rights.

== Cast ==
- Gică Enache – Self
- Vali Enache – Self
- Rică Enache – Self
- Mihaela Murgoci – USB/USR local counselor
- Cristian Zărescu – PSD mayor's counselor
- Prince Charles – Self
- Dacian Cioloș – Prime Minister

== Critical reception ==
On review aggregator Rotten Tomatoes, the film has a 100% approval rating, based on 38 reviews with an average rating of 7.5/10. The site's critical consensus reads: "Acasă, My Home presents a powerful documentary portrait of one family's odyssey that illustrates bittersweet truths about freedom and society." The film has won many awards at film festivals, for instance, the World Cinema Documentary Special Jury Award at the Sundance Film Festival, the Viktor Main Award at the DOK.fest München, and the Golden Horn Award at the Kraków Film Festival. It is praised for tackling difficult themes. Producer and Director Monica Lăzurean-Gorgan would also state that "Home is a film that reflects not only the life of a family, but also a condensed evolution of humanity—from the heart of nature in the middle of civilization, from the wild to an evolved society, with its rules, clichés, pressures and expectations. It shows us how we look at each other, through the filters and values set by the way we formed ourselves in society or outside it. Because "Home" is not a norm, but it has different meanings for each of us." Actor Ethan Hawke also expressed his thoughts on the film: "The experience of watching Radu's film at Sundance was extraordinary. The film is so special, authentic and unique—from the idea and the image to the sincere relationship with the family. It hurt me to see the changes that the protagonists had to go through, the loss of connection with nature. I was very moved and I congratulate Radu for the well-deserved success." In his review at The New York Times, film critic A. O. Scott writes: "[it] is both intimate and analytical, a sensitive portrait of real people undergoing enormous change and a meditation on what that change might mean. It taps into something primal in the human condition, a basic conflict between the desire for freedom and the tendency toward organization."
