= Lichtenhagen, Rostock =

Lichtenhagen
- Stadtteil of Rostock
- Location of Lichtenhagen within Rostock
- Interactive map of Lichtenhagen
- Location within Germany Location within Mecklenburg-Vorpommern
- Coordinates: 54°5′N 12°8′E
- Country: Germany
- State: Mecklenburg-Vorpommern
- District: Urban district
- City: Rostock

Area
  - Total: 5.9 km^{2} (2.3 sq mi)

Population (2009-12-31)
  - Total: 13,506
  - Density: 2,300/km^{2} (5,900/sq mi)
- Time zone: UTC+01:00 (CET)
  - Summer (DST): UTC+02:00 (CEST)
- Postal codes: 18109

Lichtenhagen is a borough of Rostock in the federal state Mecklenburg-Vorpommern, Germany.

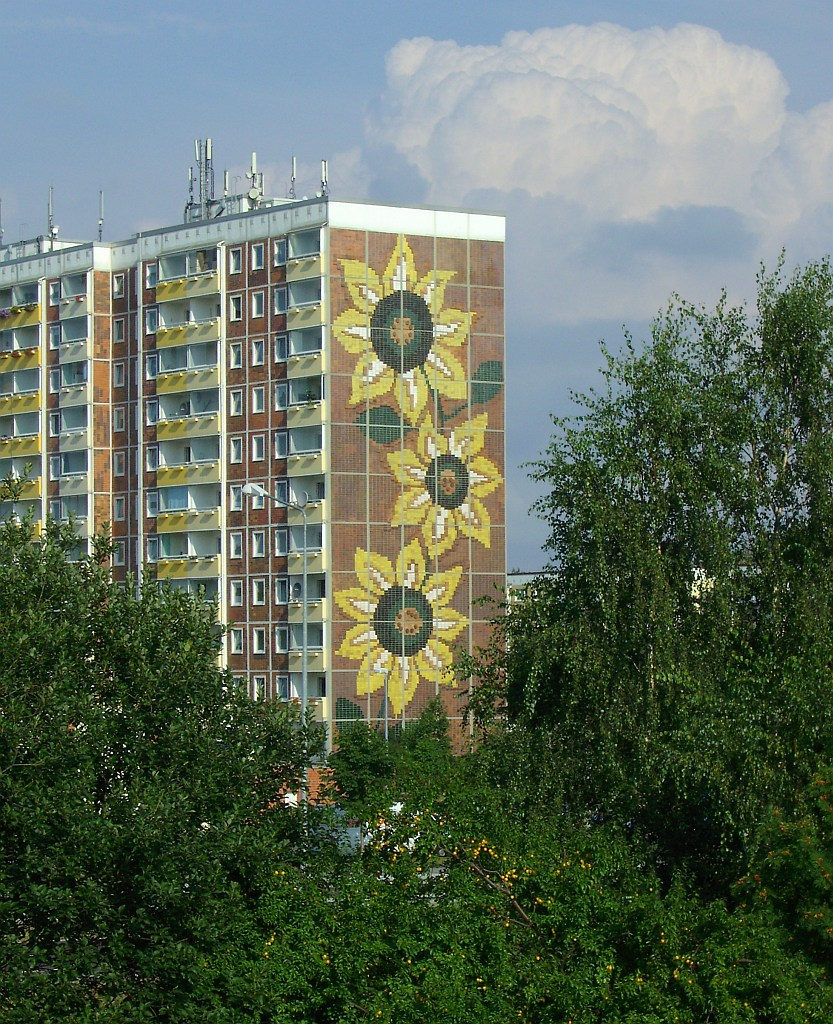
Rostock Sonnenblumenhaus

It is a Plattenbau housing estate built from 1974 to 1976. It derives its name from the adjacent village of Elmenhorst/Lichtenhagen. Its population peaked in 1988 with 20,276 inhabitants, which had fallen continuously to 13,467 by 2006. By 2013, its population recovered to 14,171, as the city of Rostock continues to grow.

The borough became infamous in August 1992 for the Lichtenhagen riots.
