= Constantin Brâncoveanu metro station =

Bucharest metro station

Coordinates: 44.39874°N 26.10904°E

Constantin Brâncoveanu
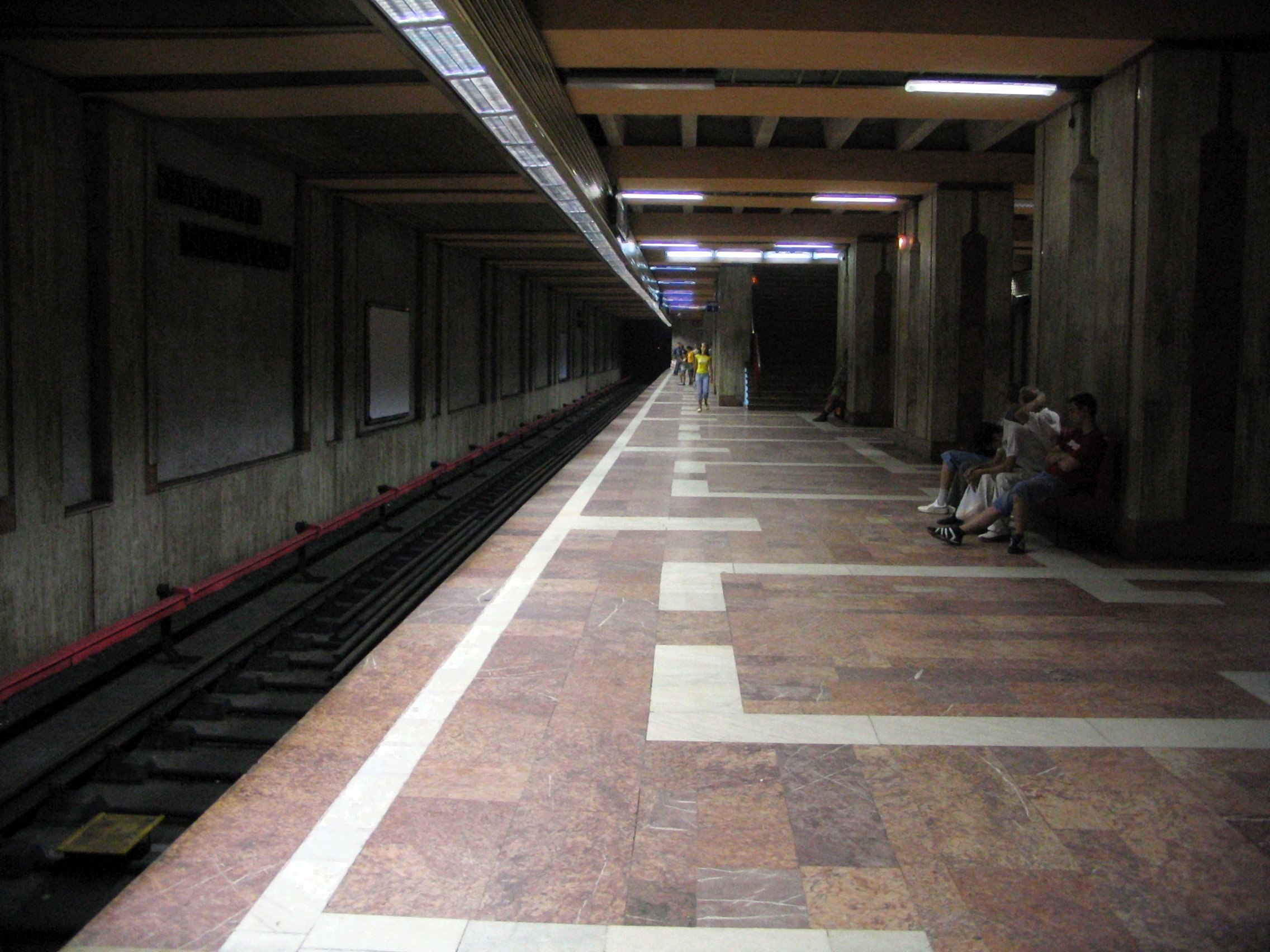

General information
- Location: Sector 4, Bucharest; Romania
- Platforms: One island platform
- Tracks: 2
- Tram routes: 1, 10
- Bus routes: 116, 141, 232

Construction
- Structure type: Underground

History
- Opened: 5 December 1988

Services
Preceding station	Bucharest Metro	Following station
Piața Sudului towards Tudor Arghezi	Line M2	Eroii Revoluției towards Pipera
Location

Constantin Brâncoveanu is a metro station in Bucharest. It is named after Constantin Brâncoveanu, a Wallachian prince (1654–1714).

It is located at the junction of the Olteniței Road (Șoseaua Olteniței) and the Constantin Brâncoveanu boulevard (Bd. Constantin Brâncoveanu), right next to the southern entrance into Tineretului Park, providing easy access to the Sala Polivalentă (Polivalenta Hall, a frequent host to sport events and concerts). Here one can find "Orașelul copiilor" (City of the Kids), the greatest amusement park in Romania.

Since the fall of communism in 1989, the platform has been dominated by a statue of Constantin Brâncoveanu and his sons, replacing the older statue of Ion Popescu-Puțuri, a communist leader.

The station opened on 5 December 1988, two years after the southern section of the M2 Line opened, likely due to lack of demand for the station in the area, when the line opened at first.
