= Eroii Revoluției metro station =

Bucharest metro station

Eroii Revoluției
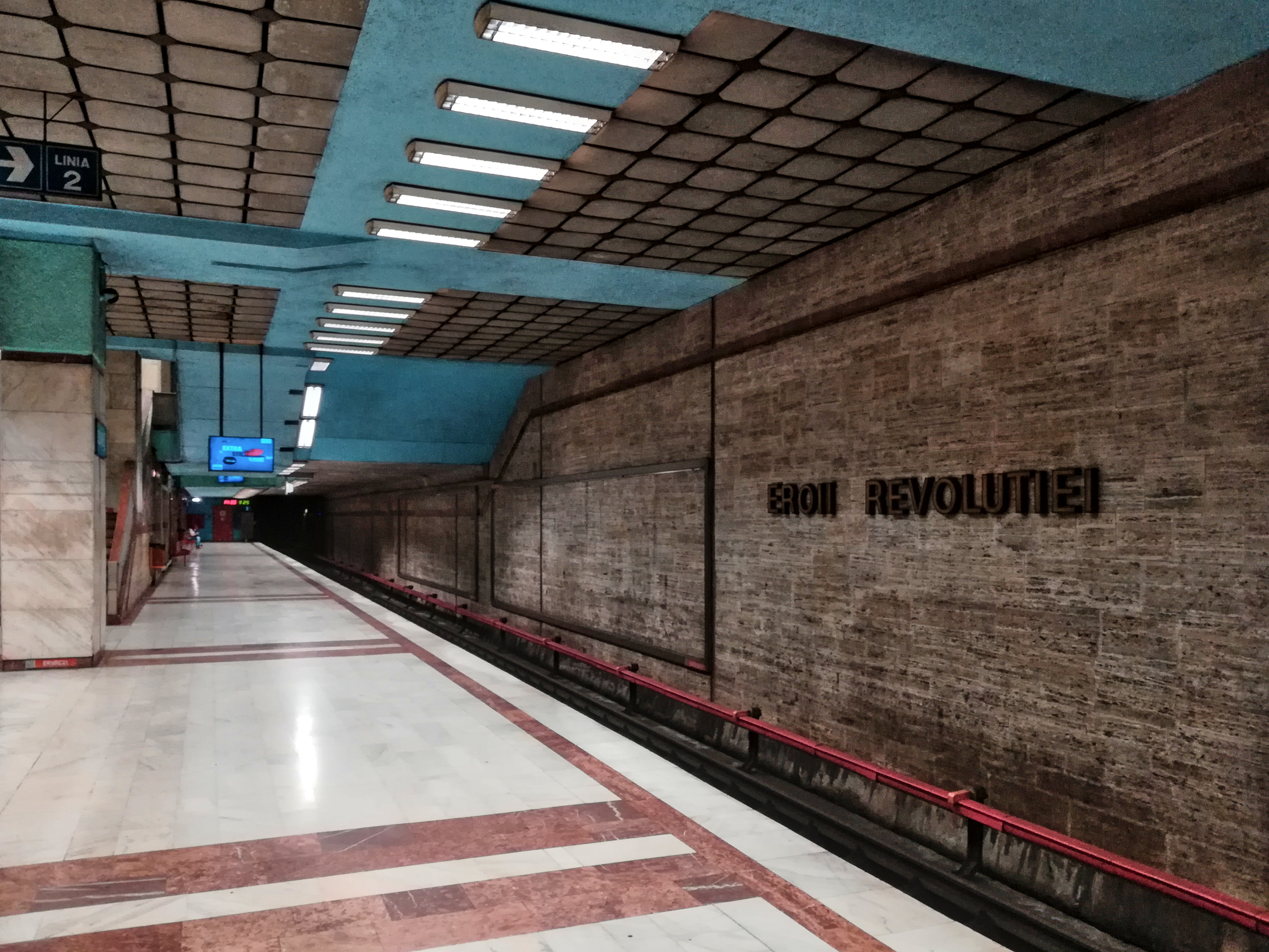
- Metro station in 2020

General information
- Location: Sector 4, Bucharest; Romania
- Coordinates: 44°24′15.25″N 26°5′47.61″E
- Platforms: One island platform
- Tracks: 2
- Tram routes: 1, 7, 10, 19, 25.
- Bus routes: 116, 141, 232, 323, 465.

Construction
- Structure type: Underground

History
- Opened: 24 January 1986

Services
Preceding station	Bucharest Metro	Following station
Constantin Brâncoveanu towards Tudor Arghezi	Line M2	Tineretului towards Pipera
Location

Eroii Revoluției (English: Heroes of the Revolution) is a metro station in Bucharest, on Bucharest Metro Line M2. It was initially named Pieptănari, but the name was changed to commemorate those people who died during the Romanian Revolution of 1989. The station was opened on 24 January 1986 as part of the inaugural section of the line, from Piața Unirii to Depoul IMGB.
