= Ferentari =

Neighborhood in Bucharest, Romania

Coordinates: 44.392564°N 26.081017°E

Ferentari on the map of Bucharest

Ferentari [fe.renˈtarʲ] is a neighbourhood located in the 5th Sector of Bucharest, Romania.

== Etymology ==
The word "Ferentari" comes from the Latin word "Ferentarius" meaning "soldier in the old pedestrian army".

== Area ==
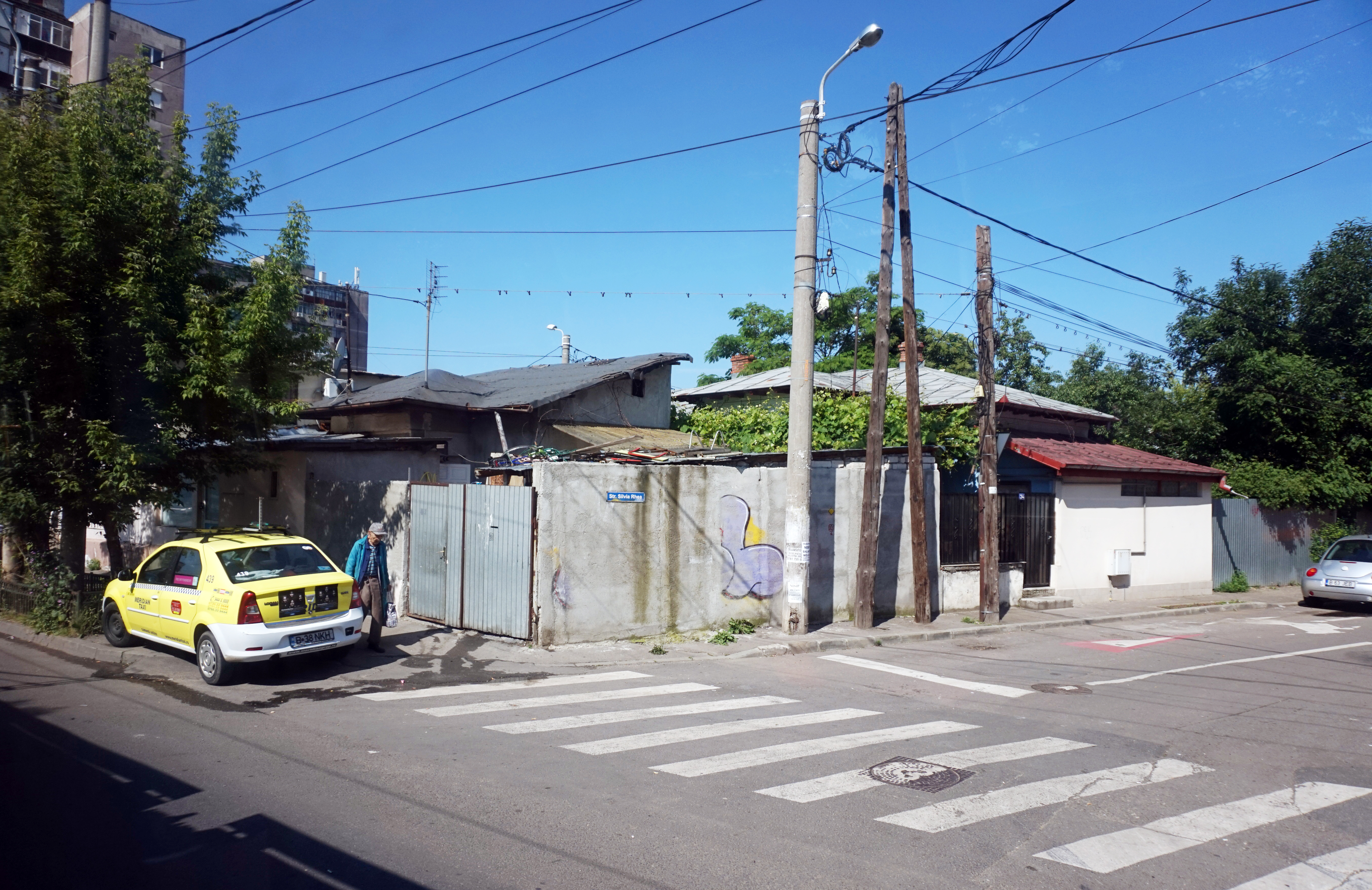
A street in Ferentari

It is located in the South-South-West of Bucharest at a distance of 2.5 to 5 kilometres (1.6 to 3.1 mi) from the city center. Connections to the city center are relatively poor, because of the limited public transport available (see below) and because of the need to cross areas subject to frequent traffic jams like Chirigiu Square.

The borough stretches along Ferentarilor Avenue (Calea Ferentarilor) and the main boundaries are: Sălaj Road (Șoseaua Sălaj) and sometimes Rahovei Avenue (Calea Rahovei) to the South West, the industrial area, the railway and partially Progresului Road (to the South-East and East), and Sălaj Road (to the West). It is bordered by the Rahova, Pieptănări, and Giurgiului boroughs. These boundaries, being totally unofficial, are subject to individual interpretation.

== History ==
Ferentari was the first modern industrial area of Bucharest developed in the middle of 19th century, when new industrial plants were built in the area and especially after the first railway in Romania was built (opened in 1869 and connecting Bucharest—via Filaret station—to Giurgiu). In 1947, the Ferentari Market housing estate was built, being the most modern (and last housing project) built during the era of the Kingdom of Romania. Between 1970 and 1978 multiple apartment buildings were constructed, including the infamous Aleea Livezilor buildings.

== Population ==
The population of the neighbourhood is around 90,000, most of whom are of Romani descent. It has been assigned the lowest quota on local taxes (at the beginning of Calea Ferentarilor: B zone, the middle area: C zone, the rest: D zone).

== Crime ==
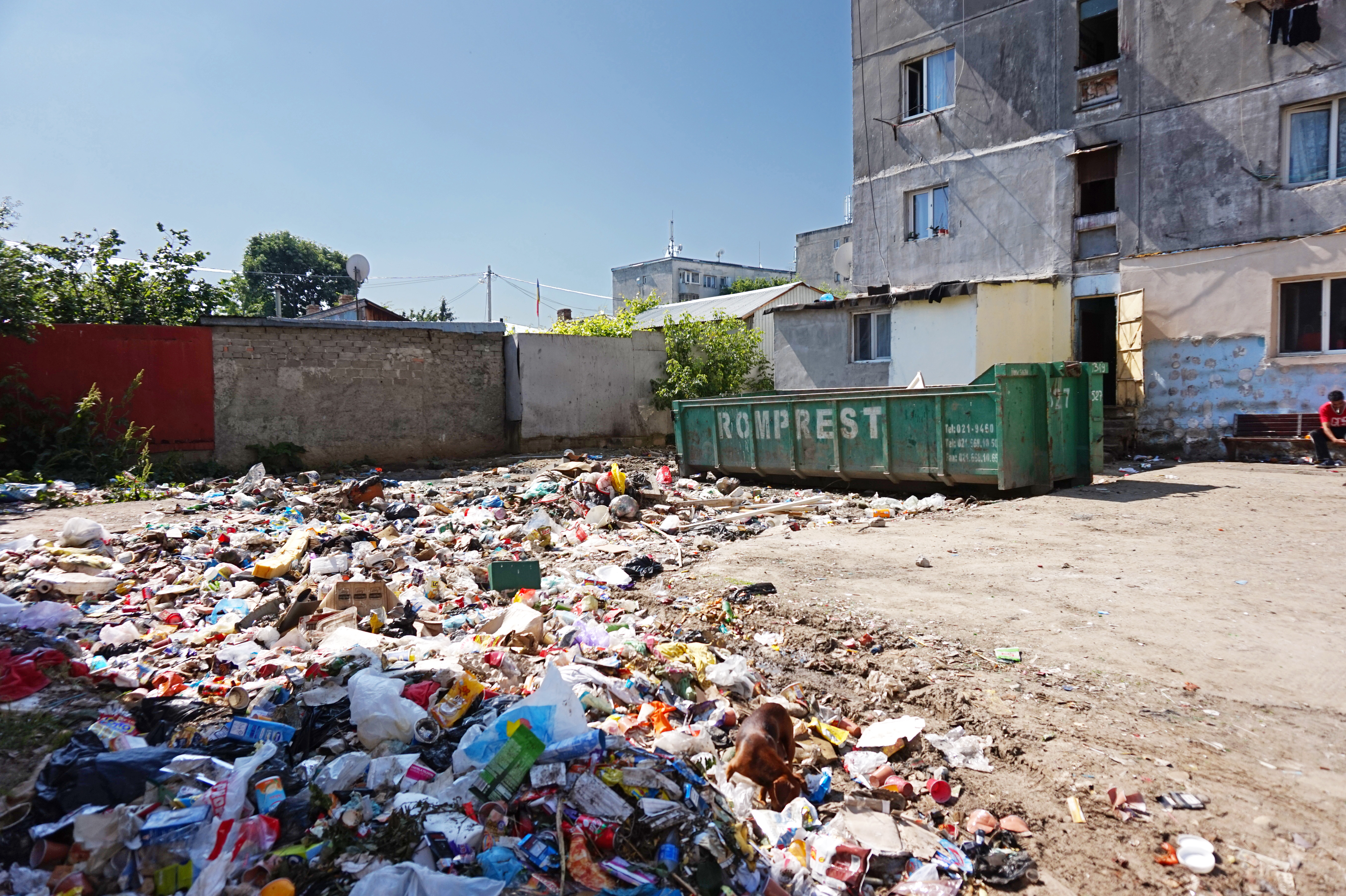
Waste between apartment buildings in Ferentari

Ferentari has a reputation as being the worst borough in Bucharest, described as being "a haven for drugs and crime". This reputation is exacerbated by arrests in the borough of the Cămătaru mob clan, and drug-related police raids done in the Zabrăuți section of the borough. It has been described as the center of drug dealing in Bucharest and was at one point the stage of a riot.

However, Ferentari has a lower crime rate in terms of burglaries in relation to much of the city. Areas such as Vadul Nou, Zăbrăuți, Prelungirea Ferentari, La Maici are notorious for squatting, and resorting to violence when they are served with eviction notices.

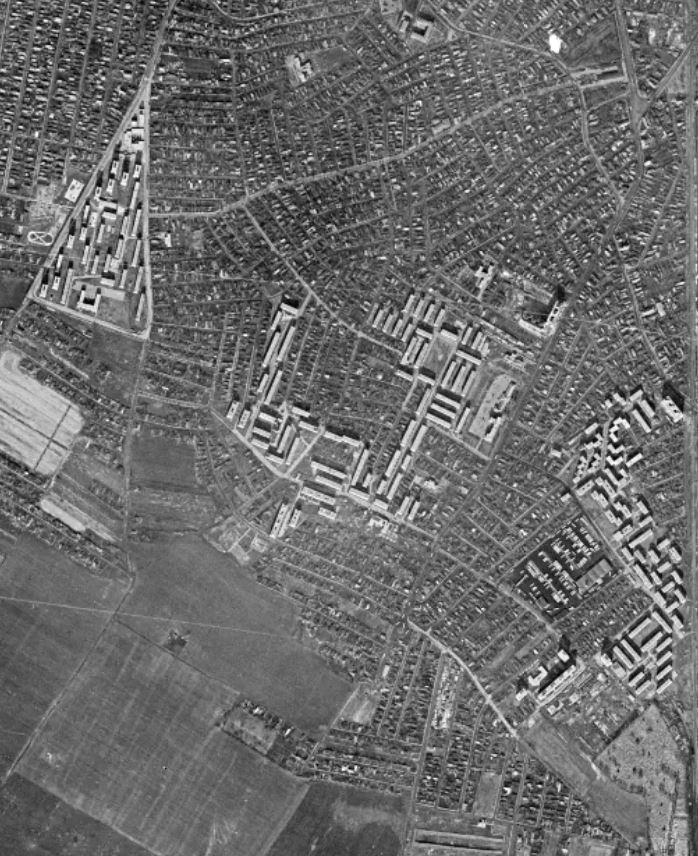
The Ferentari (right and middle) and Sălaj (left) housing estates in 1976

In the said areas, the same article quotes that 84% of the inhabitants tap into the city's electricity grid, and 64% of the inhabitants have no access to sewage, because of their status as squatters, and their inability to sign contracts with the city. As such, the areas developed informal networks stealing power, water and even cable TV signal directly from the mains. An incident linked with disconnecting illegally connected electricity users sparked the revolt of 2006.

== Transport ==
The area is served by the public transport (tramway and buses). Calea Ferentarilor prolonged by Prelungirea Ferentarilor is designed to be the connection of Bucharest to the Bucharest–Giurgiu national road.

Very little public transport serves the area (five bus lines and three tram lines compared to 11 tram lines, 22 bus lines and one trolleybus line in equally sized Rahova). Only one of the bus lines in the borough connects it with the city center, namely line 117 (the official route maps are available).
