= Progresul =

Coordinates: 44.373°N 26.098°E

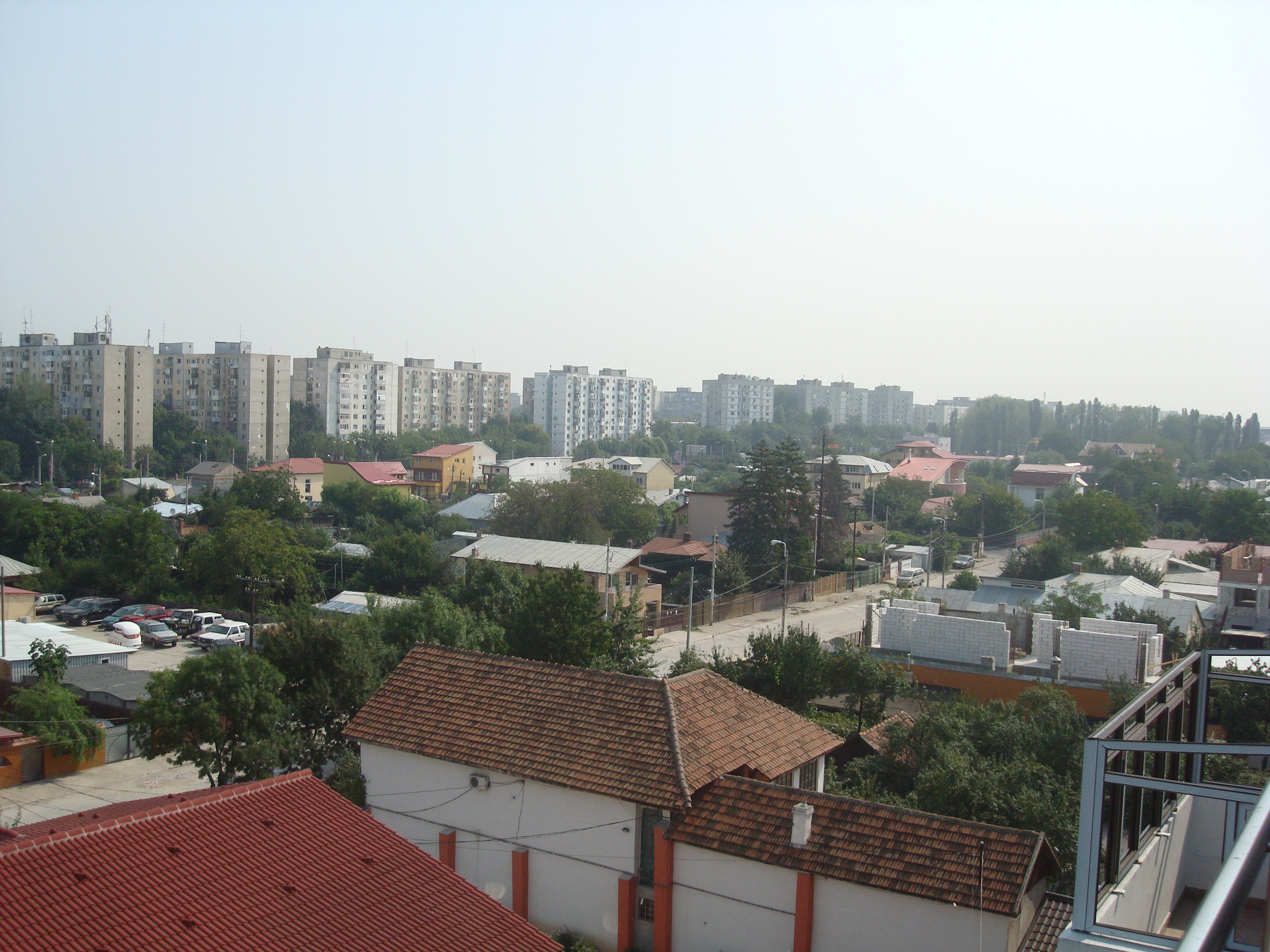
The district in 2010

Progresul is a district in southern Bucharest's Sectorul 4, Romania.
