= Sector 4 (Bucharest) =

Bucharest, Sector 4 Sector 4, București
- Sector
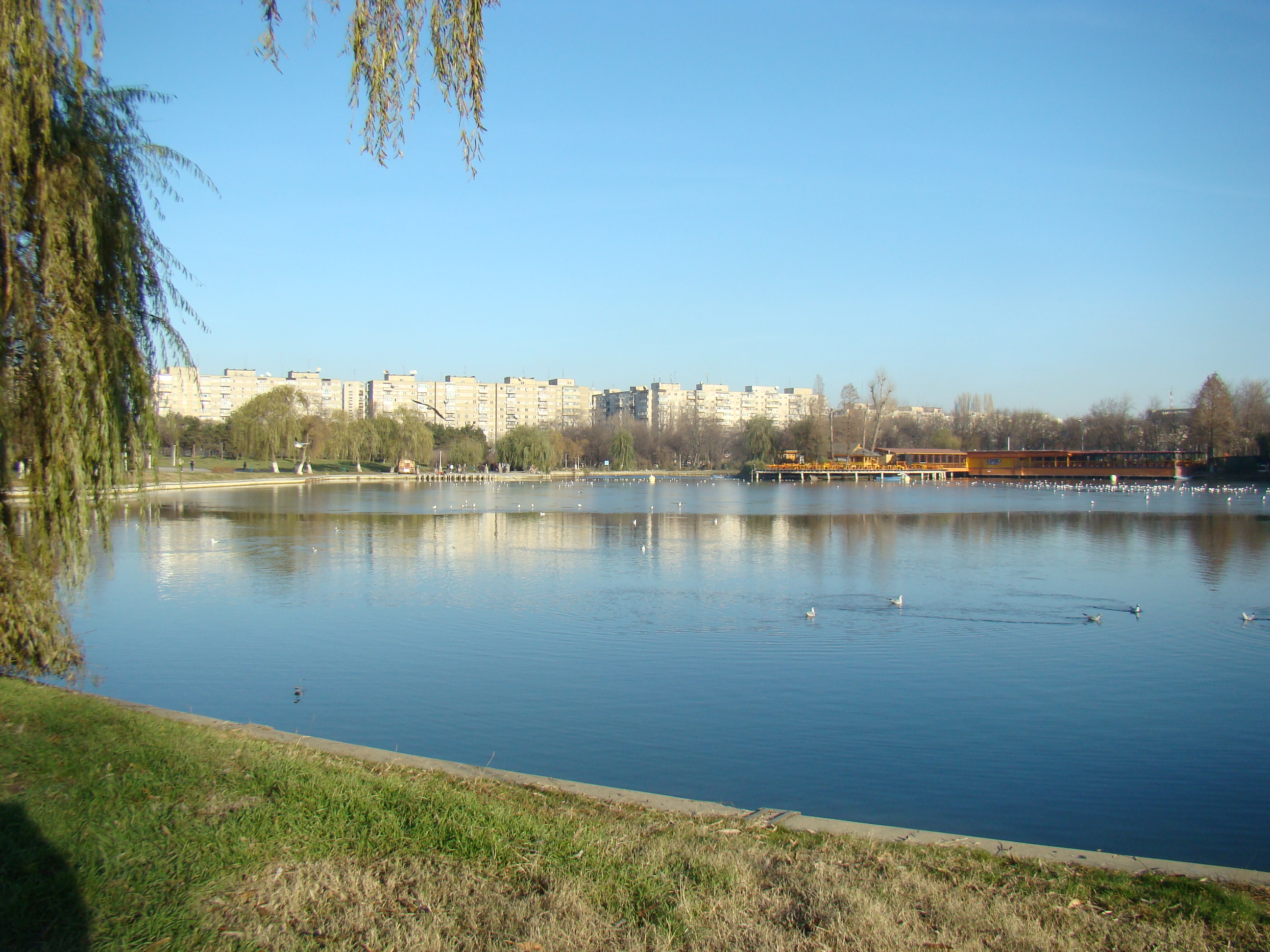
- Tineretului Lake
- Interactive map of Bucharest, Sector 4
- Coordinates: 44°25′17.4″N 26°05′21.9″E
- Country: Romania
- County: Municipality of Bucharest

Government
  - Mayor: Daniel Băluță (PSD)
  - Deputy-mayor: Dan Bogdan Delegeanu (PSD)

Area
  - Total: 34 km^{2} (13 sq mi)
- Elevation: 60–90 m (200–300 ft)

Population (December 1, 2021)
  - Total: 262,780
  - Density: 7,728.8/km^{2} (20,018/sq mi)
- Time zone: UTC+2 (EET)
  - Summer (DST): UTC+3 (EEST)
- Postal Code: 04xxxx
- Area code: +40 x1
- Car Plates: B
- Website: www.ps4.ro

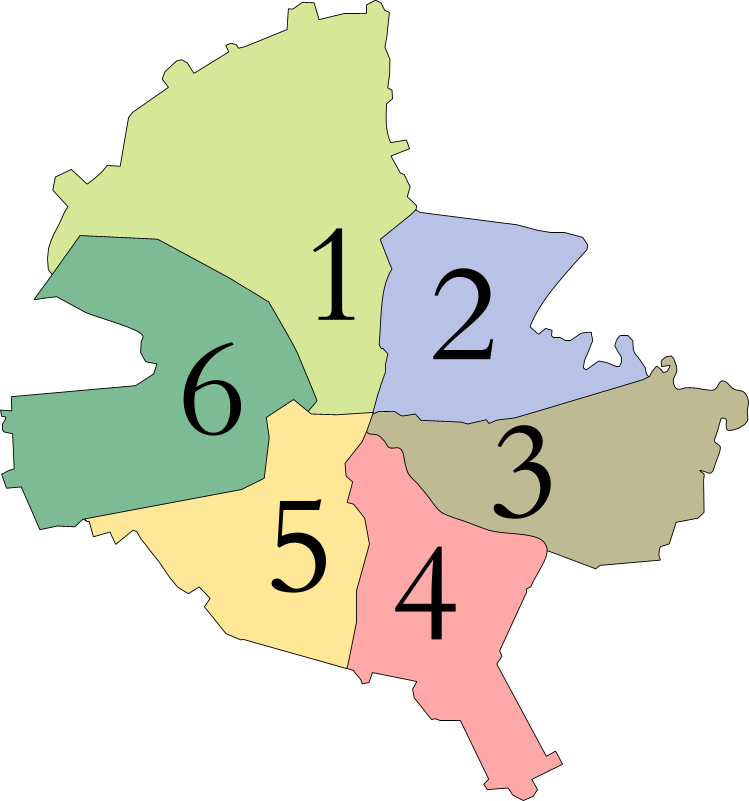
The six sectors of Bucharest

Sector 4 (Romanian: Sectorul 4) is an administrative unit of Bucharest.

== Economy ==
Romavia had its head office in Sector 4.

== Quarters ==
- Berceni
- Giurgiului
- Olteniței
- Progresul
- Timpuri Noi
- Tineretului
- Văcărești

Carol Park, Tineretului Park, and the Văcărești Nature Park are all located in Sector 4 of Bucharest.

== Politics ==
Daniel Băluță from the Social Democratic Party (PSD) is the current mayor, having been elected to the position in 2016 and re-elected in 2020. The Local Council of Sector 4 has 27 seats, with the following party composition (as of 2020):

Party	Seats	Current Council
Social Democratic Party (PSD)	11	
Save Romania Union (USR)	9	
National Liberal Party (PNL)	5	
People's Movement Party (PMP)	2	
