= Tineretului metro station =

Bucharest metro station

Coordinates: 44°24′53″N 26°06′17″E

Tineretului
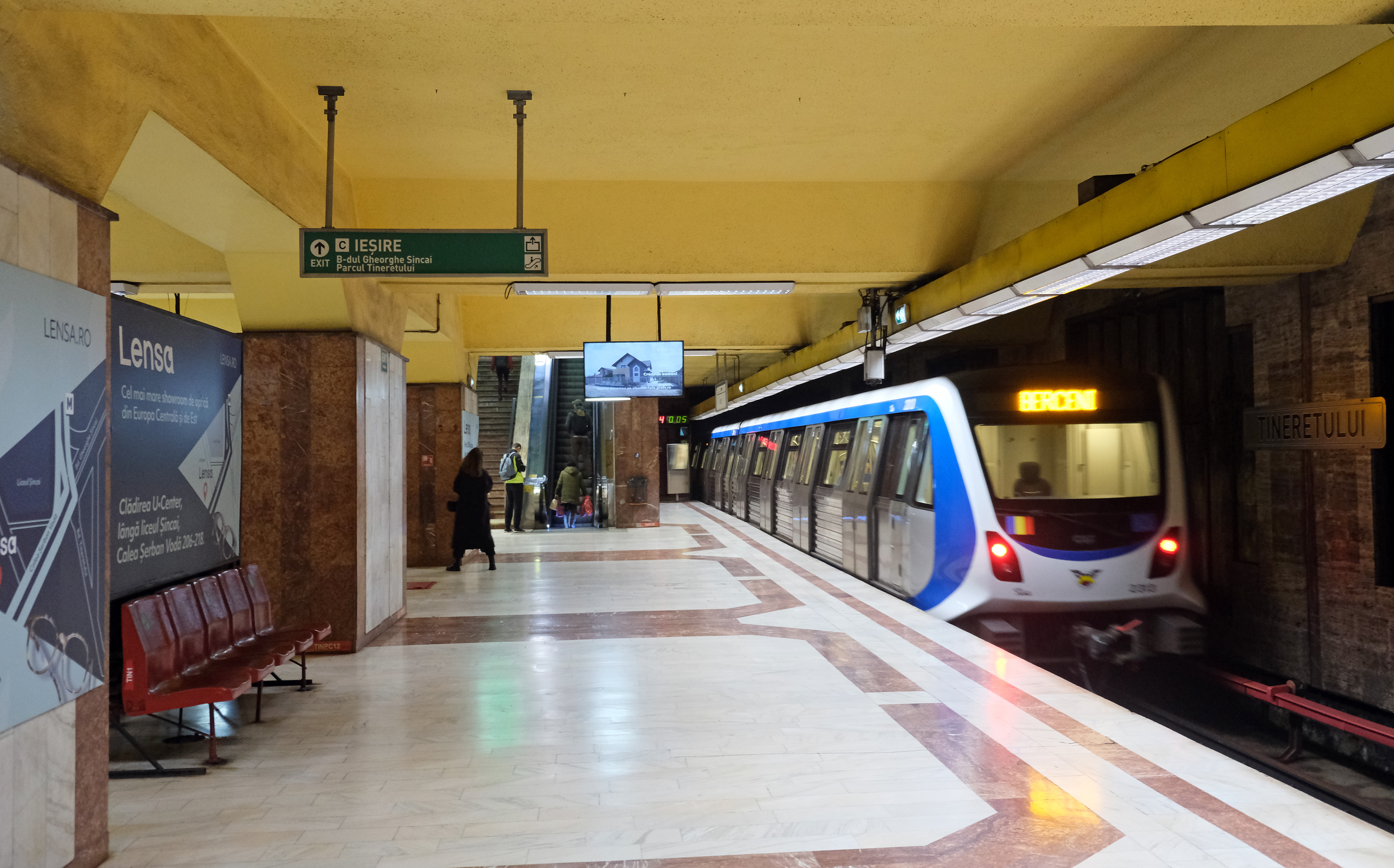
- Metro station in 2022

General information
- Location: Tineretului Park; Sector 4, Bucharest; Romania
- Platforms: One island platform
- Tracks: 2
- Tram routes: 19
- Bus routes: 73, 116, 323, 381.

Construction
- Structure type: Underground

History
- Opened: 6 April 1986

Services
| Preceding station | Bucharest Metro | Following station |
|---|---|---|
| Eroii Revoluției towards Tudor Arghezi | Line M2 | Piața Unirii towards Pipera |
Location

Tineretului (Youth's station in English) is a metro station in Bucharest, Romania, on the Bucharest Metro Line M2.

The station was inaugurated on 6 April 1986 as part of the previously built section of the line, from Piața Unirii to Depoul IMGB. The station is named for the Tineretului Park (Youth's Park) nearby.
