= Giurgiului =

Neighborhood of Bucharest

Coordinates: 44°23′21″N 26°05′31″E

- Map showing Giurgiului within Bucharest

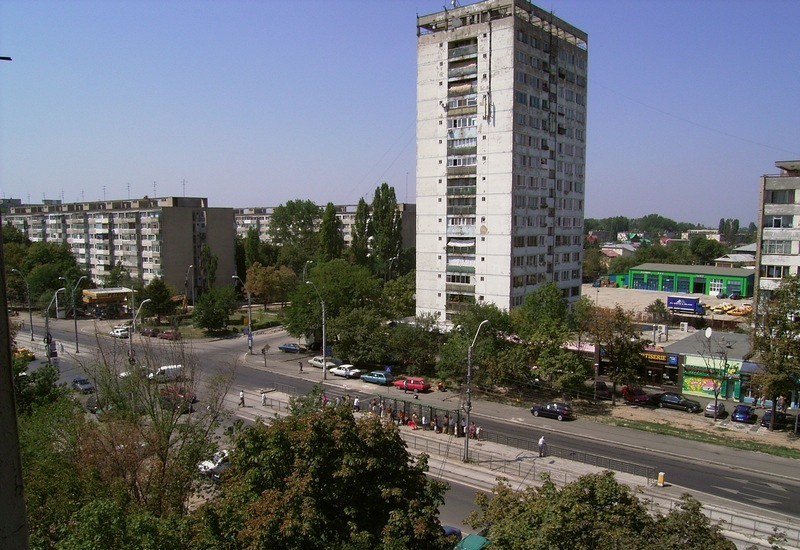
The Toporași tramway station in Giurgiului

Giurgiului (Romanian pronunciation: [ˈdʒjurdʒjuluj]) is a neighborhood in the southern part of the Romanian capital Bucharest, in Sector 5, near Berceni and Ferentari. Like Berceni, Giurgiului has many 10-storey blocks of flats that were built under Communist rule, starting with 1959–1964. The estimated population is between 30,000 and 40,000. Before the Communists started their massive building programme, Giurgiului was a farming village. After 1948 the village was added to the city area. A few years later in the south of the neighborhood a pipe factory was built along with a power plant, CET Berceni.

Giurgiului has a cemetery, which includes a memorial to an estimated 300 Jewish refugees who sailed from Romania aboard the motor schooner Mefküre and were killed when a Soviet submarine sank the ship in August 1944.

== History ==
As mentioned before, the area was at first placed on the road towards the town of Giurgiu, the namesake of the neighborhood. The area was made up of small farms, agricultural fields and houses.

The communist government insisted on a modernization programme of the area, using the sparsely populated areas of Bucharest (including Berceni) to build modern apartment buildings. The north–south trunk route plan involved building in the South section of this route a number of apartment buildings. Thus, the beginnings of the current Giurgiului housing estate are listed below:

- 1958: The housing buildings of the IDEB workers and the construction site workers are completed, they are located near the Jewish Cemetery.
- 1959: The construction work for the 5-staircase apartment blocks begins and the Progresul market is included in this programme as well, being completed by late 1960-early 1961.
- 1962: The construction work for another row of 5-staircase apartment blocks begins as well, by this time, the construction work for the last of the apartment blocks that began construction in 1959 is finished.
- 1963: The construction work for the 11-storey tower blocks, apartment blocks with 5 to 6 staircases and 7-storey apartment blocks begins.
- 1968: By around this time, all the construction work for the original apartment buildings in the original modernization programme is finished.
- 1971: In the nearby Berceni housing estate, the construction work for the prefabricated 4-storey buildings begins.
- 1972: The construction work for the prefabricated 10-storey apartment buildings (in 2 to 5 staircases) commences.
- 1977: Further southwards, where the IDEB housing buildings are located, the construction of large 10-storey apartment buildings with 4 to 7 staircases commences. They are struck by the Vrancea earthquake, which forces the authorities to close the construction sites temporarily, in order to seismically retrofit them, along with other buildings in the neighborhood. Upon the completion of the first buildings, people left homeless by the quake are moved to these apartment blocks, a move that will span up to early 1978.
- 1979: The construction site for all these previously mentioned buildings is finished.
- 1986: The construction work for a group of prefabricated 8-storey apartment buildings begins, situated further northwards near the Pieptănari metro station.
- 1989: By the December 1989 revolution, most of these 8-storey buildings are finished, although a couple of them are still not done.
- 1990: After the completion of the last 8-storey buildings, all the construction sites in the Giurgiului housing estate are closed.

From an architectural point of view, the buildings are standardized, but especially on the 1960s buildings, there is a noticeable Western Modernist influence, typical of Romanian housing estates built in that era. The neighborhood was also designed to feature a lot of space for greenery, and the buildings are laid out in such a way that the centerpiece of the housing estate is the tower block near Toporași, one of the few tower blocks built in the respective era. The planners responsible for the construction of the housing estate were Mircea Bercovici, Constantin Gherghiceanu, and Cleopatra Alifanti.

== Transport ==
The neighborhood has a good transport network, although it is not fully serviced by the Bucharest Metro, with the nearest station being Eroii Revoluției. STB tram routes 7 and 25 link Giurgiului with the city centre, and route 19 links it to the Titan housing estate. STB bus routes 102, 116 and 323 link the neighborhood with other parts of Bucharest. Giurgiului has a CFR railway station on the line linking Bucharest with the Danube port of Giurgiu, further south towards Jilava; as of 2009, the line was closed to normal operation. The Giurgiului Road that passes through the middle of the neighbourhood is an important route to Giurgiu and Bulgaria.
