= Filaret railway station =

Railway station in Bucharest, Romania

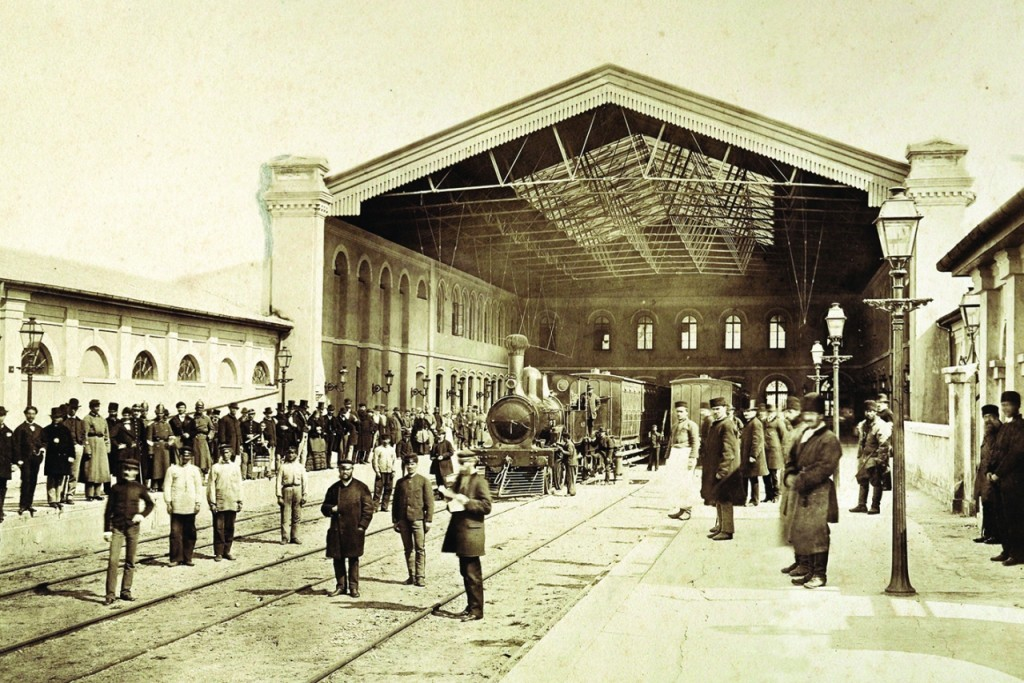
- Filaret station in 1875

General information
- Location: Piața Gara Filaret 1 Bucharest; Romania
- Coordinates: 44°24′56″N 26°05′32″E
- Line: Bucharest–Giurgiu railway line

History
- Opened: 1869
- Closed: 1960
Location
- Location within Bucharest Location within Romania

Filaret railway station (Romanian: Gara Filaret) was the first railway terminal in Bucharest, the capital of Romania. Opened in 1869, it was the northern terminus of the Bucharest–Giurgiu railway line. The station was named after its location by Filaret Hill in the southern part of the city.

== History ==
The station was opened on 31 October [O.S. 19 October] 1869 at the occasion of the inauguration of the Bucharest–Giurgiu railway line, the first railway line in the United Principalities of Moldavia and Wallachia. The station was closed as a railway station in 1960 after having lost traffic to Bucharest North railway station (Romanian: Gara de Nord). In 1960, the communist government turned it into a bus station.

== See also ==
- List of railway stations in Romania
- History of rail transport in Romania
- Rail transport in Romania
