= 2006 Ferentari riot =

2006 Romanian riot

A small riot took place in Ferentari–Zăbrăuți area of Bucharest, Romania on the evening of November 14, 2006. Ferentari is Bucharest's poorest district, with a bad reputation with respect to crime.

== Events preceding the riot ==
The riot took place after four Roma children were asphyxiated in the basement of an apartment block in the Zăbrăuți area on November 13, as a result of a fire caused by candles. The children had lived with their mother in their dwelling for more than two years, and were obliged to light the basement with candles as they had no access to electricity.

According to the administrator of the apartment block, none of the building's inhabitants had formal access to electricity for four years, with many people connecting themselves illegally to the electricity grid.

== The riot ==
The riot occurred because Electrica, the electricity provider company, decided to cut the electricity in some blocks, due to energy theft and consumer debts. However, power outages occurred for several blocks, including few consumers without debts. In most flats, there was no central heating, and people were using electric radiators, which are costly to operate. There were also some apartments with air conditioners, so the total debts (not including the stolen energy) rose to €400,000. The stolen energy was estimated at €430,000 per month.

According to the protesters, the local council of Sector 5 had repeatedly refused to authorize their reconnection to the grid. This led to around 200 inhabitants from the Zăbrăuți area to violently protest against their situation, torching tires, blocking traffic in the area, and breaking the window of a fire truck, while calling for the electricity supply to be restored. However, only 20% of the inhabitants of the area had any papers proving ownership or rent over the said flats, with the rest being squatters.

The electricity provider was criticized for not cutting the energy in summer, so that people could make plans for winter.

Both the electricity provider and Bucharest 5th Sector Mayor, Marian Vanghelie, were criticized by then-Prefect of Bucharest Mioara Mantale for concluding electricity supply contracts for those blocks, as they were built as temporary shelters for construction workers and were never finalized. Apart from electricity, they do not have a fresh water supply, sewage, or heating.

Vanghelie said he would not make any concessions. President Traian Băsescu also commented on the events: "I stand by my previous statement. Bucharest is not for everyone. Every one of us must pay [our bills]!" (Romanian: Îmi mențin ideea pe care am mai spus-o. Bucureștiul nu este un oraș în care poate locui oricine. Toți trebuie să plătim!).

== Outcome ==
Realitatea TV was presenting a news broadcast about the riot at the same time with the planned show about the latest ranking of the richest Romanians made by the publication Capital, at which Cristian Țânțăreanu and Gigi Becali were invited to speak about their wealth. Cristian Țânțăreanu said the ranking contained the 300 richest Romanians and there were about 300 people protesting, so why shouldn't every one of them help one of the poor people who were protesting. Gigi Becali said he would donate enough money to help all the protesting people, but he doesn't have time to make sure that the respective people would also go to work (clean their buildings, etc.), as Țânțăreanu suggested. At that time Becali didn't know how much money this would cost him; he was later informed it was about €400,000, which he paid.

Becali was criticized for this, as it might be unfair for the ones who only through effort managed to pay the energy bills. Alex Savitescu, said "crime becomes not only understood, accepted, but rewarded".

According to a poll made by students from SNSPA (The National School for Political and Administrative Studies) two days after the protests, if elections were to be held the following Sunday, 93% of people from Zăbrăuți would go to vote and 70% would vote for Gigi Becali as President, and 55.1% would vote for his party, the New Generation Party – Christian Democratic (PNG). At the meeting where people were thanking him, he said

Pe mine mă cheamă Becali. Cuvântul meu e literă de Evanghelie. Nu o să pot să fac toată țara asta, o să fac toată țara asta când o să devin președinte și o să mă doară inima de români (My name is Becali. My word is as good as the word of the Holy Scripture. I cannot do the same for everyone in this country now but I will do so when I become president and as president I'll feel the grief of the Romanian people).

== See also ==
- Ferentari
- Romani people in Romania
- 1993 Hădăreni riots
