= Văcărești, Bucharest =

Neighbourhood in south-eastern Bucharest

Coordinates: 44°24′0.22″N 26°7′53.94″E

Văcărești (Romanian pronunciation: [vəkəˈreʃtʲ]) is a neighbourhood in south-eastern Bucharest, located near Dâmbovița River and the Văcărești Lake. Nearby neighbourhoods include Vitan, Olteniței, and Berceni. Originally a village, it was incorporated into Bucharest as it expanded. Its name is related to the Wallachian aristocratic Văcărescu family, with an etymology leading back to the Romanian văcar, "cow-herder," and the suffix -ești.

== The Monastery and quarter ==
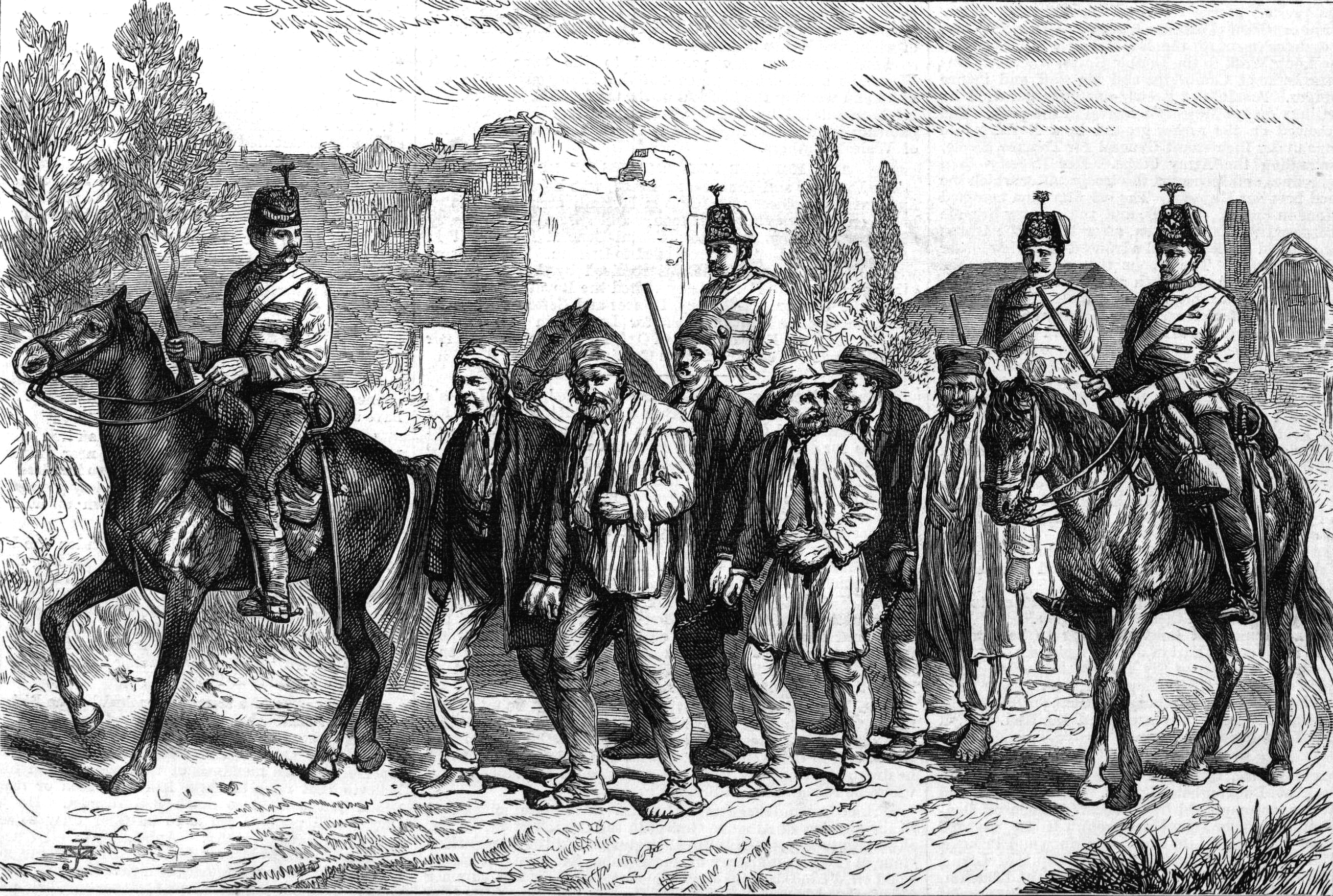
Spies taken from the Russian camp to the Văcărești Prison, Bucharest

The Văcărești Monastery, built by Nicholas Mavrocordatos in 1716, was located on the Văcărești hill, nowadays near Piața Sudului. It was demolished in 1984 during the regime of Nicolae Ceaușescu to make room for a Palace of Justice that was never built. It was the largest 18th-century monastery in Southeastern Europe and it had a church in the style of Curtea de Argeș Cathedral. It was also designed to be used as a fortress, and was seized in May 1771 by the Imperial Russian army, under commander Nikolai Vasilyeich Repnin, in the context of the Russo-Turkish War and Pârvu Cantacuzino's rebellion.

Part of the buildings of the monastery were used as a prison. Inmates that were incarcerated at Văcărești Prison during the 20th century include Ioan Slavici, Tudor Arghezi, Corneliu Zelea Codreanu and other members of the Iron Guard, Liviu Rebreanu, and Richard Wurmbrand. The nearby hill was home to Arghezi's long-time residence, the house he nicknamed Mărțișor (nowadays a museum).

== Jewish history ==
In the 19th century, many Jewish immigrants settled in Văcărești, most of them coming from Imperial Russia. Văcărești and Dudești were the areas where the poorest Jews settled. On 21 January 1941, the fascist Iron Guard started its coup against Ion Antonescu, with whom they had shared government power since September (see Legionnaires' Rebellion and Bucharest Pogrom). The Iron Guard legionnaires killed 125 Jews, including in Văcărești and Dudești. On 24 January 1941 Ion Antonescu suppressed the rebellion and the Iron Guard was banned and the members arrested.

Almost all the Jews emigrated to the newly created state of Israel after World War II. Văcărești was one of the quarters that was completely torn down by Ceaușescu and nowadays few traces of the old quarters remain.

== Văcărești Lake ==
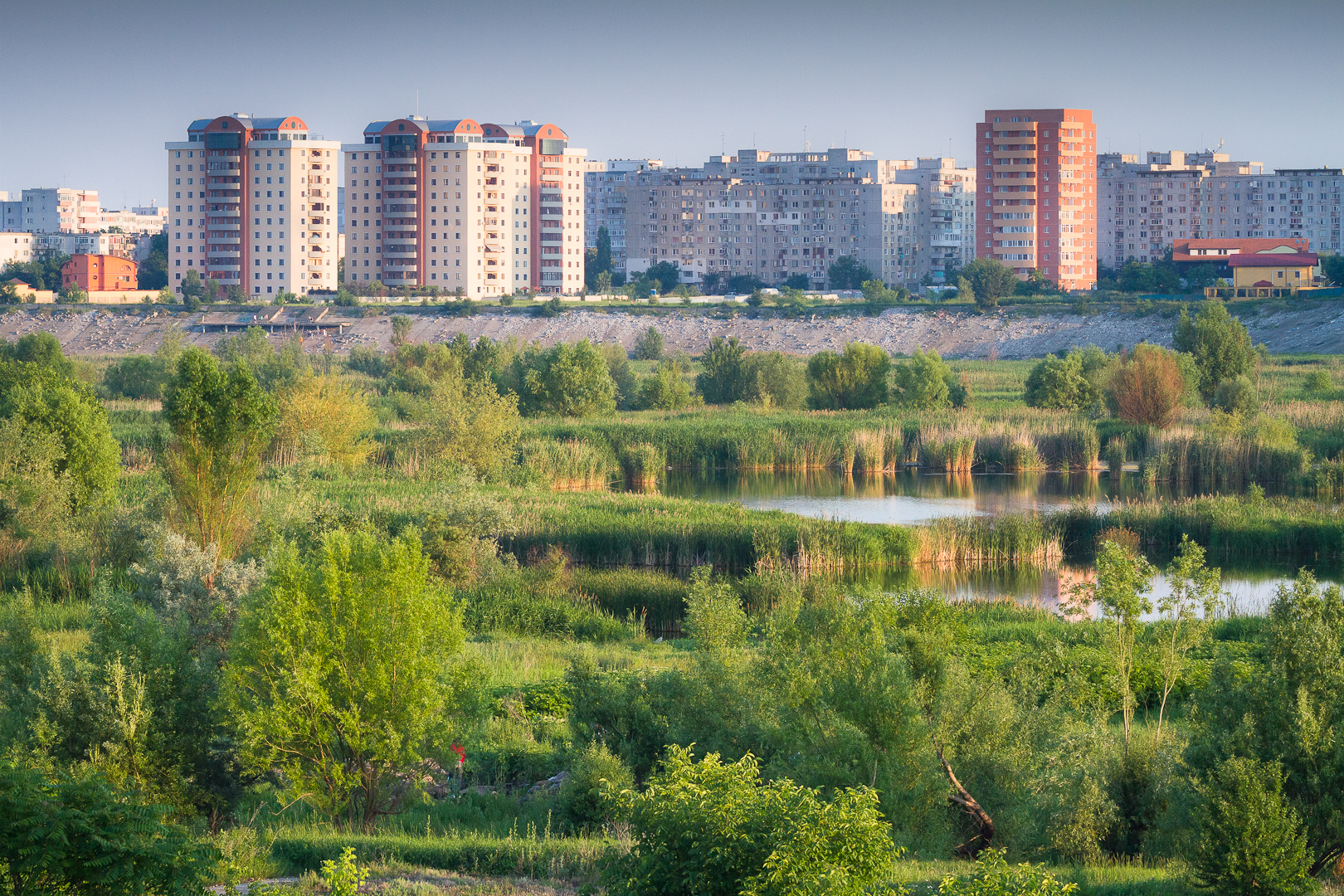
Văcărești Lake

In the 1980s, Ceaușescu wanted to build a large amusement park (3 km^{2}), demolishing a sparsely built area and making place for a lake with a concrete bottom. However, it was never completed and it still remains barren as of 2022.

In 2002, 1.83 km^{2} of the terrain were given for 49 years to a company owned by Australian citizen Tony Mikhael that wanted to invest €650 million and build some residential areas as well as a golf course, a hippodrome, a hotel and some clubs. The terrain itself is estimated to be worth about €500 million, as the land costs in the area around €300/m^{2}. Săptămâna Financiară argued that the concession of the terrain was illegal and that the Romanian state only gets around €0.28/m^{2}.
