= 1993 Hădăreni riots =

1993 Romani pogrom in Romania

Coordinates: 46°28′01″N 23°59′01″E

The 1993 Hădăreni riots (Romanian: Ciocnirile de la Hădăreni, Hungarian: 1993-as hadrévi pogrom) were a series of riots in the village of Hădăreni, Mureș County, Romania, involving Romanians and Hungarians on the one side against Roma on the other side, ending with three ethnic Romas (Lupian Rapa Lăcătuș, Aurel Pardalian Lăcătuș, and Mircea Zoltan) and one ethnic Romanian, Crăciun Chețan, being murdered.

== The riots ==
On 20 September 1993, a group of Roma had an argument with an elderly Romanian. When his son arrived to rescue the father, one of the Romas stabbed him to death. The Roma then sought refuge in a house where they locked themselves in. The Romanians demanded they leave the house and render themselves to police. As the Roma refused to come out of the house, the Romanian and Hungarian villagers, including the local police commander and one of his officers, gathered outside, sprayed the house with gasoline and set it on fire. Two Roma were lynched when they tried to flee, one burned to death inside, and one escaped. There had been dozens of complaints from the majority population about thefts committed by Roma in the previous period which were never solved by police.

Afterwards, in a "classic case of mob justice", 13 (or 14, according to some sources) Roma houses were burnt down, and an additional four were damaged. The police did nothing to stop the attacks. Most of the 130 Roma inhabitants of the village fled into the nearby woods, returning only after days or even weeks.

The government, in its official explanation, expressed understanding for the "anger of the villagers."

== The trial ==
After charges were filed in 1997, five men were convicted by a Romanian court of murder, and seven of property destruction and disturbing public order. In 1999, the Romanian Supreme Court acquitted two of the accused murderers and reduced the charges against the other three.

The European Court of Human Rights decided that the Romanians have to pay €238,000 compensation to the group of Roma whose houses were burnt down. According to the European Court verdict, representatives of the Romanian Police participated in the arson, and then tried to hide this. The court also decided that the ethnic origin of the people involved was an important factor in its outcome, and that the length of the trial (11 years) infringed on their right to a fair trial.

== See also ==
- Romani people in Romania
- 2006 Ferentari riot
