= Olteniței =

Coordinates: 44.396045°N 26.115575°E

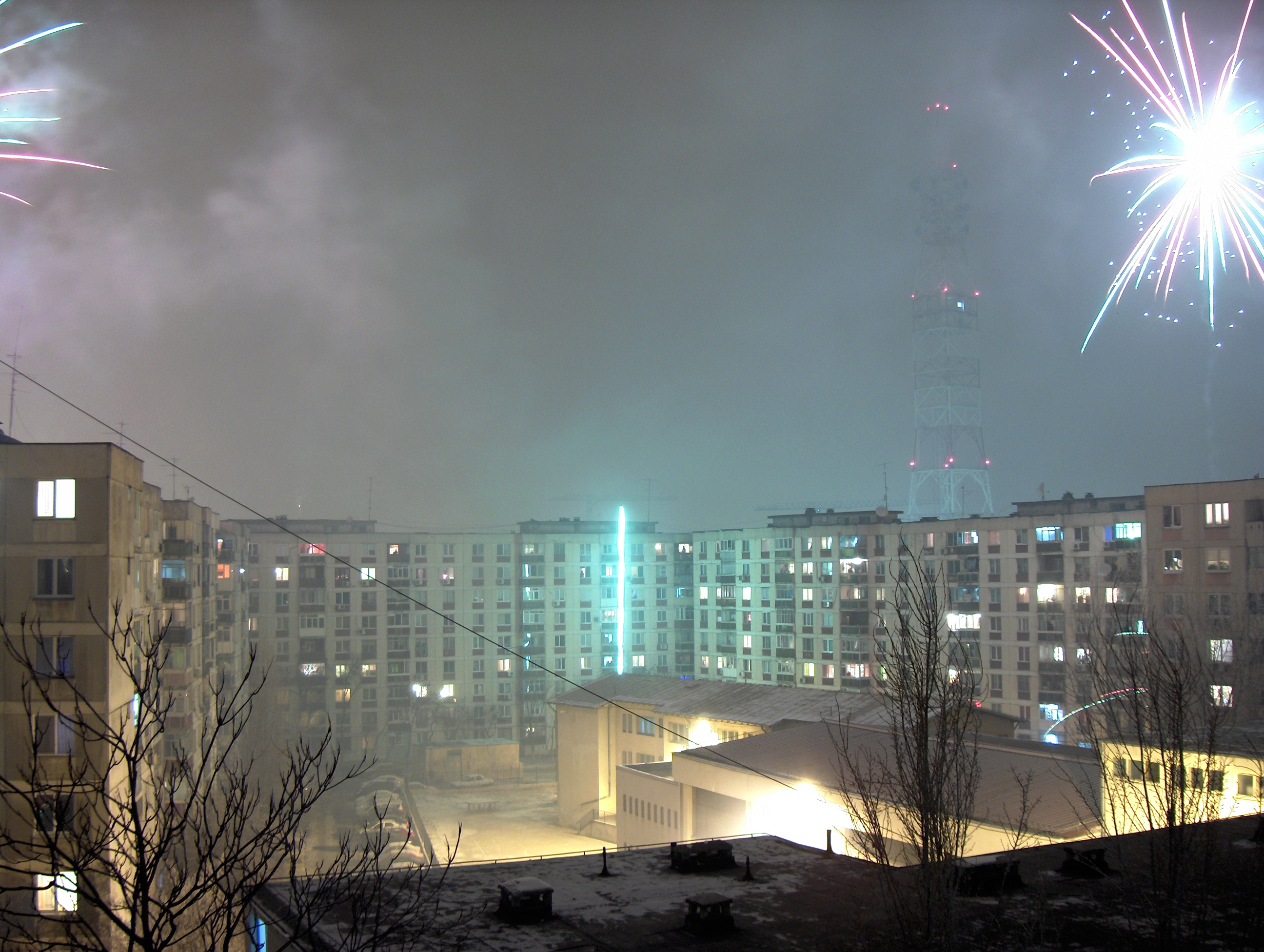
Type 772 apartment buildings (1982-1986) in Olteniței during the night.

Olteniței is a quarter in Bucharest's Sector 4, in the southern part of the city. A subdivision of Berceni, it gained its current form in the 1980s, when apartment buildings were constructed over old houses that were demolished. Most of these buildings are known as "Type 772", a modular prefabricated panel design that was very popular in the 1980s in Romania (its origins lie in a building design from 1976).
