= Tineretului Park =

Park in Bucharest, Romania

Tineretului Park (Youth's Park)
- Parcul Tineretului
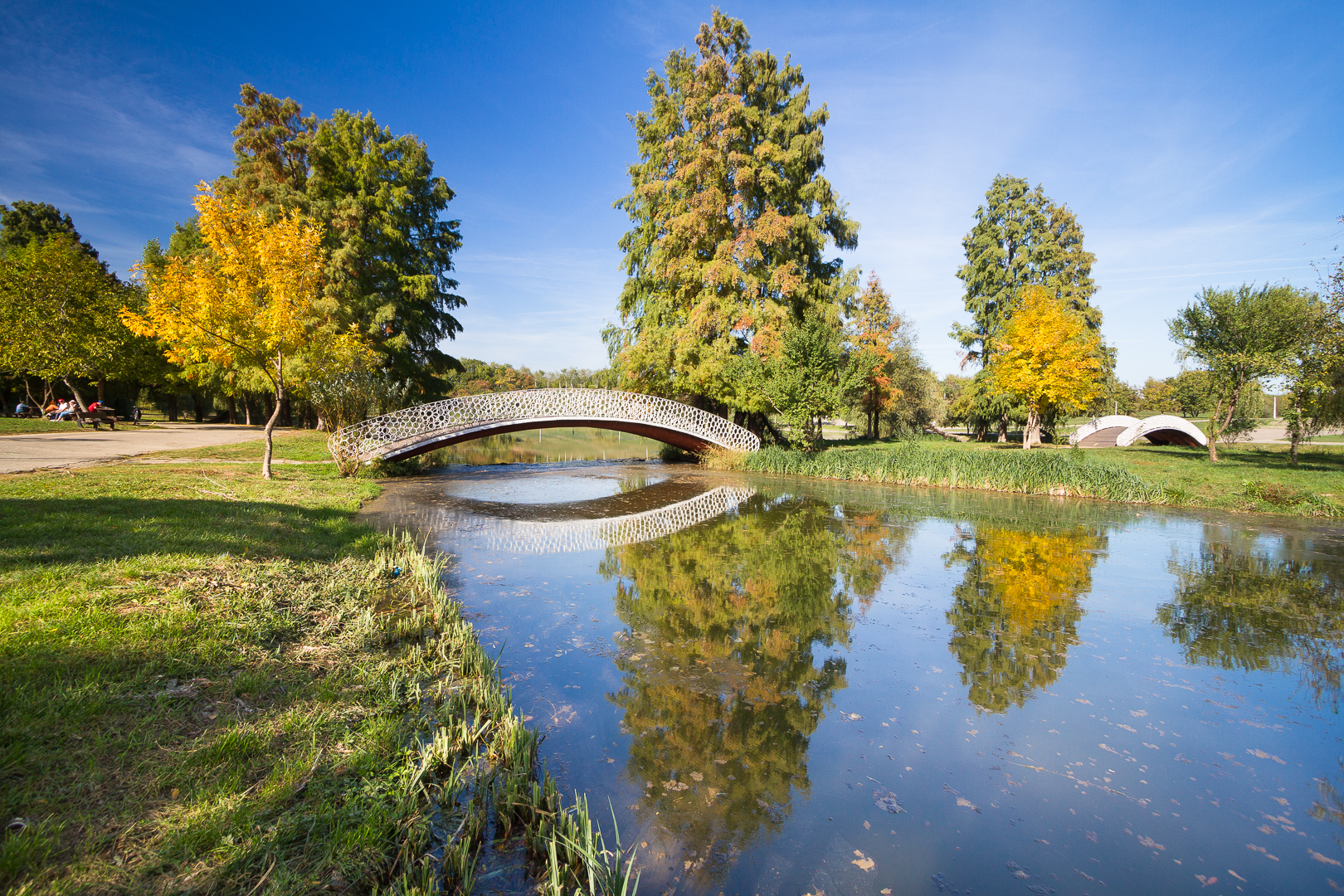
- View of the little island inside the park

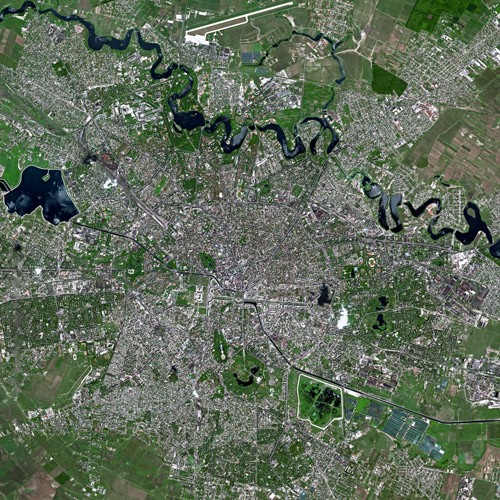
- Location within Bucharest, Romania
- Location: Bucharest, Romania
- Coordinates: 44°24′27.09″N 26°06′20.15″E
- Area: 94 hectares (230 acres)
- Established: 1974
- Designer: Valentin Donose
- Administrator: Administrația Lacuri, Parcuri și Agrement București
- Status: Open all year
- Public transit: Tineretului metro station Constantin Brâncoveanu metro station

Tineretului Park (Romanian: Parcul Tineretului, "Youth's Park") is a large public park in southern Bucharest (Sector 4).

== History ==
The park, which was created in 1965 and finished in 1974, was planned by the architect Valentin Donose. It was designed as the main recreational space for southern Bucharest, an area which was heavily developed during the 1960s and 1970s. It has a surface area of 94 hectares (230 acres) and attracts an average of 7,800 visitors on a weekend day.

== Landmarks ==
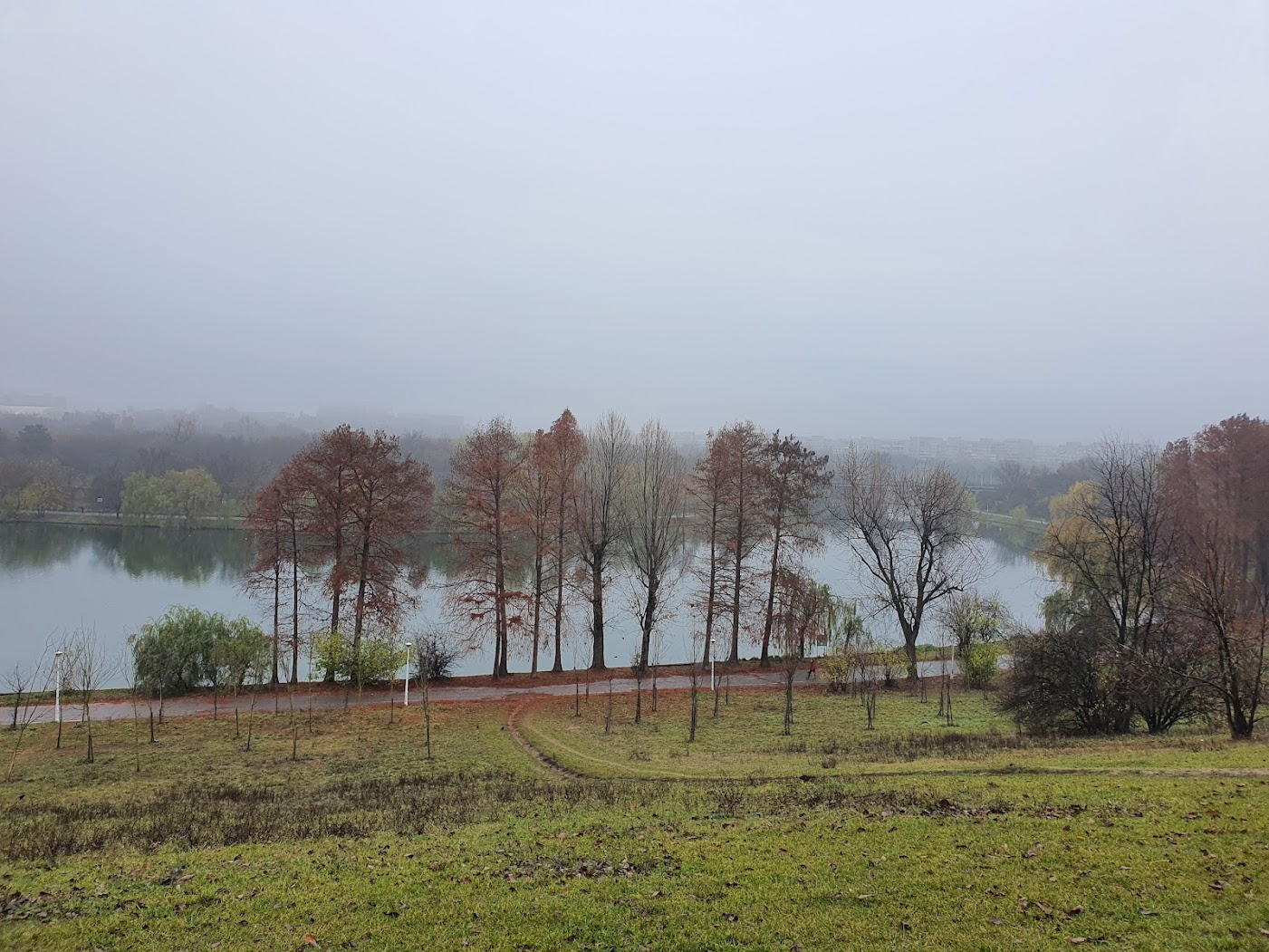
Tineretului Lake in Bucharest

Aside from green areas around the lake, the park contains a number of playgrounds as well as a navigable lake, utilised by leisure boats in summer. Tineretului Park contains the Sala Polivalentă, one of Bucharest's largest multi-purpose halls, used for concerts and indoor sporting events.

The south-east corner of the park is a children's area called "Orășelul Copiilor" ("Children's Mini-town"). Within Orășelul Copiilor one can find fair ground rides, small rollercoasters and other fun rides for all ages. There is a mini train that takes people around the park. In 2013 the area was redesigned and new open-bars and recreational areas and attractions were constructed. Along them a new beautiful dancing fountain can be admired.

On its south-western side, the park abuts the Bellu Cemetery.

== Transportation ==
The park is serviced by two Metro stations: Tineretului and Constantin Brâncoveanu.
