= Berceni, Bucharest =

Coordinates: 44°23′18.73″N 26°7′4.17″E

Berceni on a map of Bucharest

Berceni is a district (cartier in Romanian) of southern Bucharest.

== Location ==
Geographically, it has a trapezoidal shape, bordered by Olteniței Road to the north and Turnu Măgurele Street to the south. Built during the 1960s, it is a typical Communist-era working class district, lacking any major green spaces or cultural attractions. It has a population of roughly 110,000.

== Etymology ==
It is believed that the name comes from the hussars of Miklós Bercsényi, who were first mentioned after the suppression of the Hungarian Kuruc War led by Francis II Rákóczi (at beginning of the 18th century). They settled in the neighborhood of Bucharest. Another theory claims that the name comes from an archaic Romanian word for tax collector.

== History ==
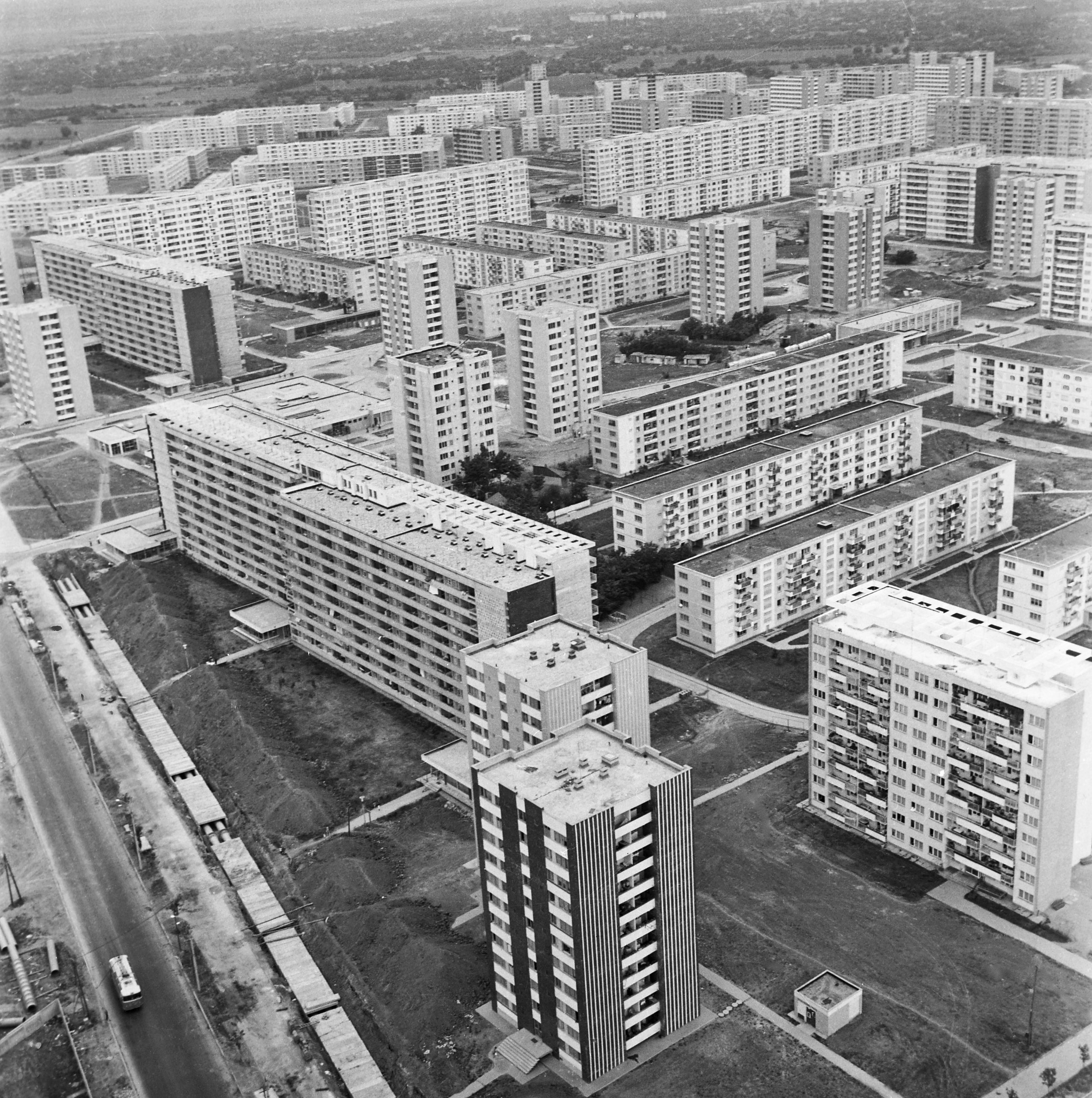
Aerial view of Berceni in June 1969

Before the 1960s, Berceni was situated outside of Bucharest, in a very sparsely populated area where only a few rural properties were located, with the nearest landmarks being the long-gone Văcărești Monastery, and starting from the latter half of the 19th century, the Bellu Cemetery. In the interwar period, the Alexandru Obregia hospital was opened.

On 5 April 1964, the Scînteia newspaper announced plans for a new housing estate, being built specifically for the workers at the IMGB plant located nearby, which opened in 1963. Construction works began the same year, which brought many Lipovan Russians from the Dobruja region of Romania, who worked with excavating and laying foundations for the buildings. The first dwellers moved in 1965 when the first apartment buildings (4 to 9 storeys high) were completed, although the housing estate had its shortcomings: the local market was not ready on time, so trucks with food supplies would come in the mornings for the residents. On the other hand, the Lipovans found multiple graves on the construction site of a school.

The construction of the 4-storey apartment blocks was done much faster due to the type of the buildings using prefabricated panels, in one of the first large-scale uses of prefabs in apartment blocks. The 9-storey apartment blocks used the more traditional construction methods. 5,500 apartments were planned to be built in the first stage: the goal was achieved in 1968, but construction works were completed by around 1976. The buildings closer to Piața Sudului were also built at the same time.

The western half of Berceni (located closer to the Giurgiului housing estate) began to be constructed starting from 1971 using more austere 4-storey and 10-storey apartment blocks, being exclusively built with prefabricated panels, the construction of which was completed by 1981. The second stage had fewer green spaces and more buildings that were built closer to each other. A group of small houses was left undemolished, and it still exists today, because, according to the institute that planned this housing estate, it gave the area "a special characteristic".

Berceni also benefitted from a large shopping center (BIG Berceni) which opened in February 1975, various schools and multiple trolleybus routes that opened in the late 1960s. The M2 line of the Bucharest Metro began operating in the vicinity of the neighborhood starting from 24 January 1986, serving the Piața Sudului and Apărătorii Patriei areas, along with the IMGB industrial area; however this led to the trolleybus network of Berceni being isolated from the rest of the trolleybus network of Bucharest in 1987, in an attempt to re-engineer the ground transportation in the city by building district-based networks.

In the last stage, multiple apartment blocks were built nearby from 1982 to 1990 in various areas of the housing estate, especially on the Olteniței Avenue and Constantin Brâncoveanu Avenue. In the 1980s it was the largest working class housing estate in Southern Bucharest, being one of the main four large scale housing estates built in the 1960s.

After the Romanian Revolution of 1989, the housing estate became infamous for its high crime rates, although this issue has been less common in the last decade. Starting from 2016, a program was launched to rebuild the roads and renovate multiple apartment buildings.

== Other ==
There is also a village of Berceni, which is situated to the south and is outside Bucharest city limits.

== Gallery ==
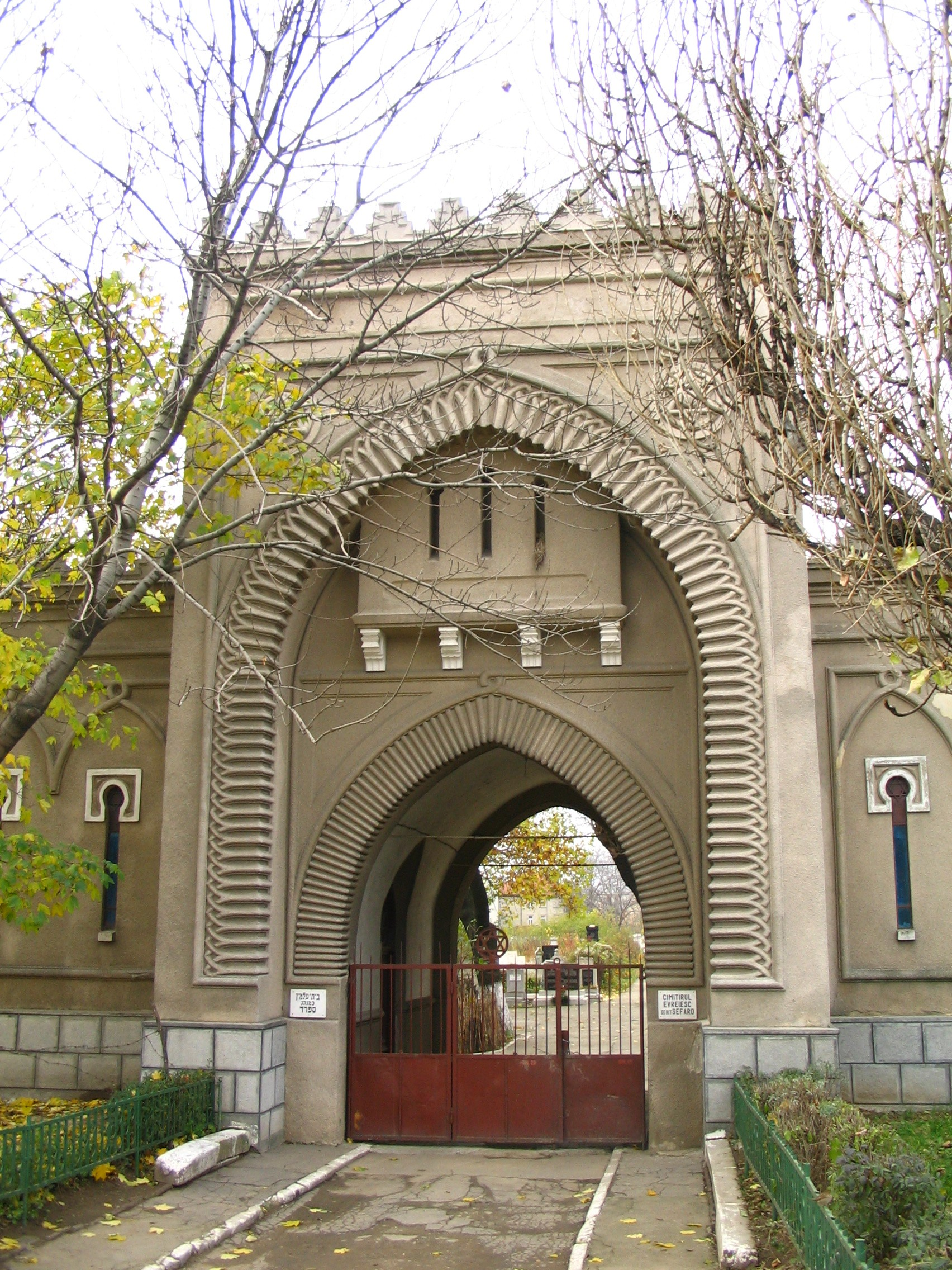
Bucharest Sefard Jewish cemetery

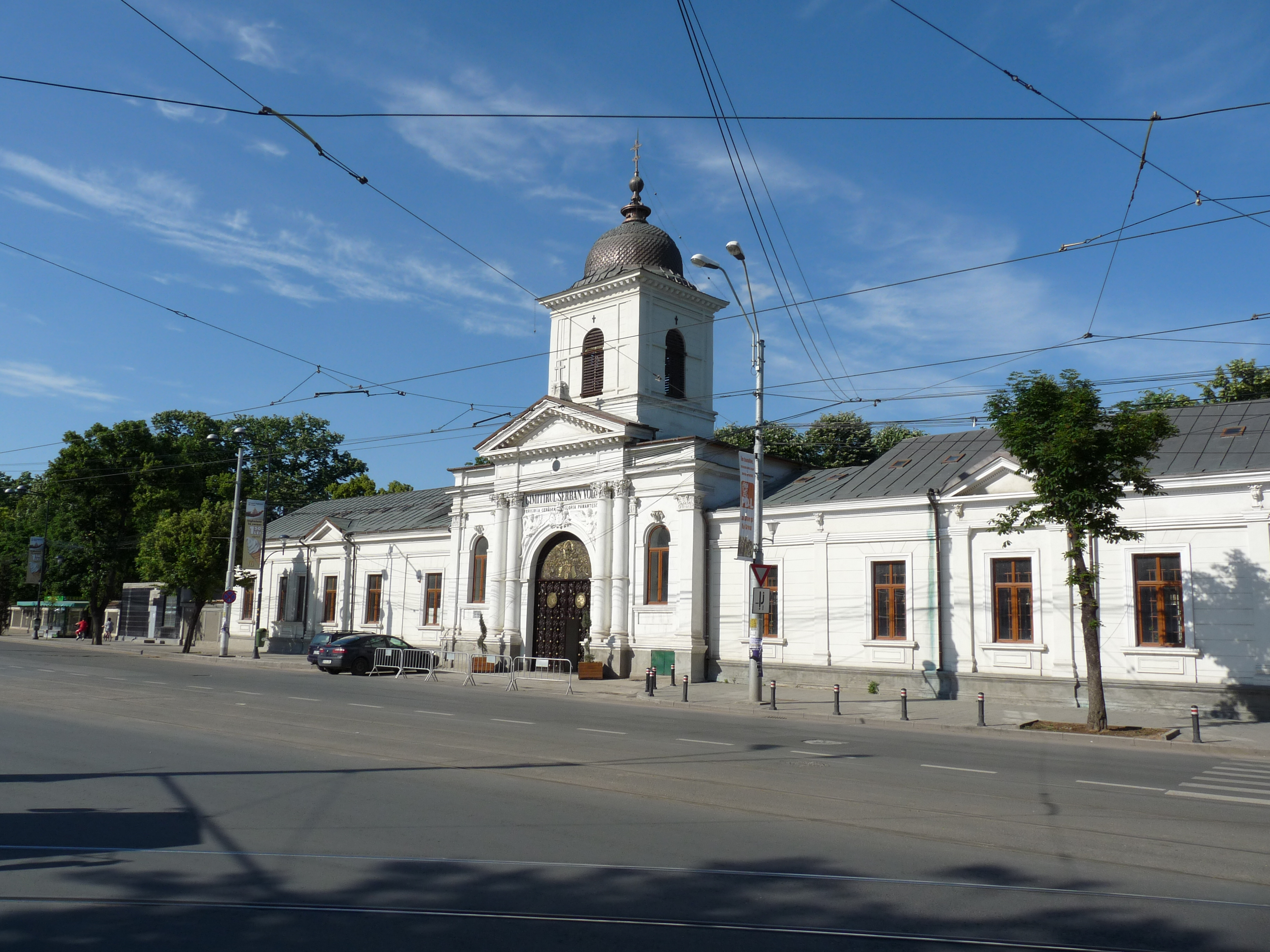
Bellu Cemetery

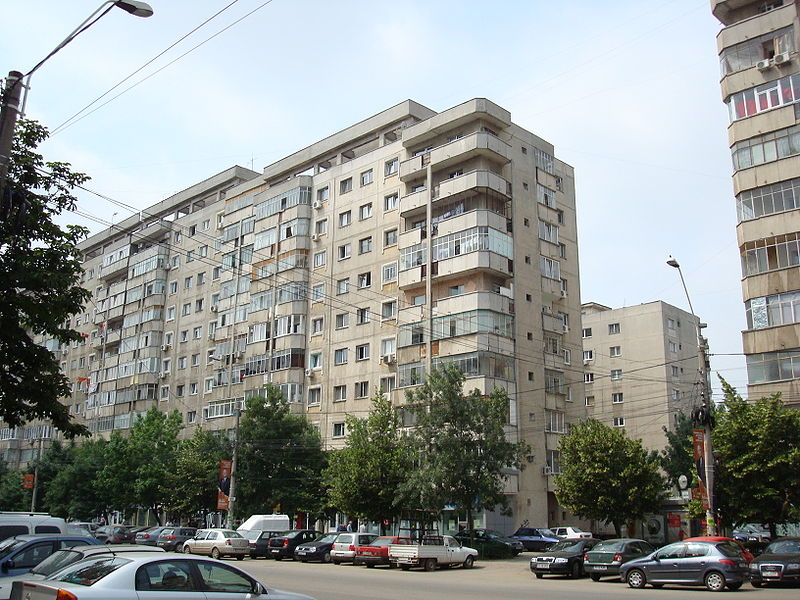
Boulevard Constantin Brâncoveanu, Berceni

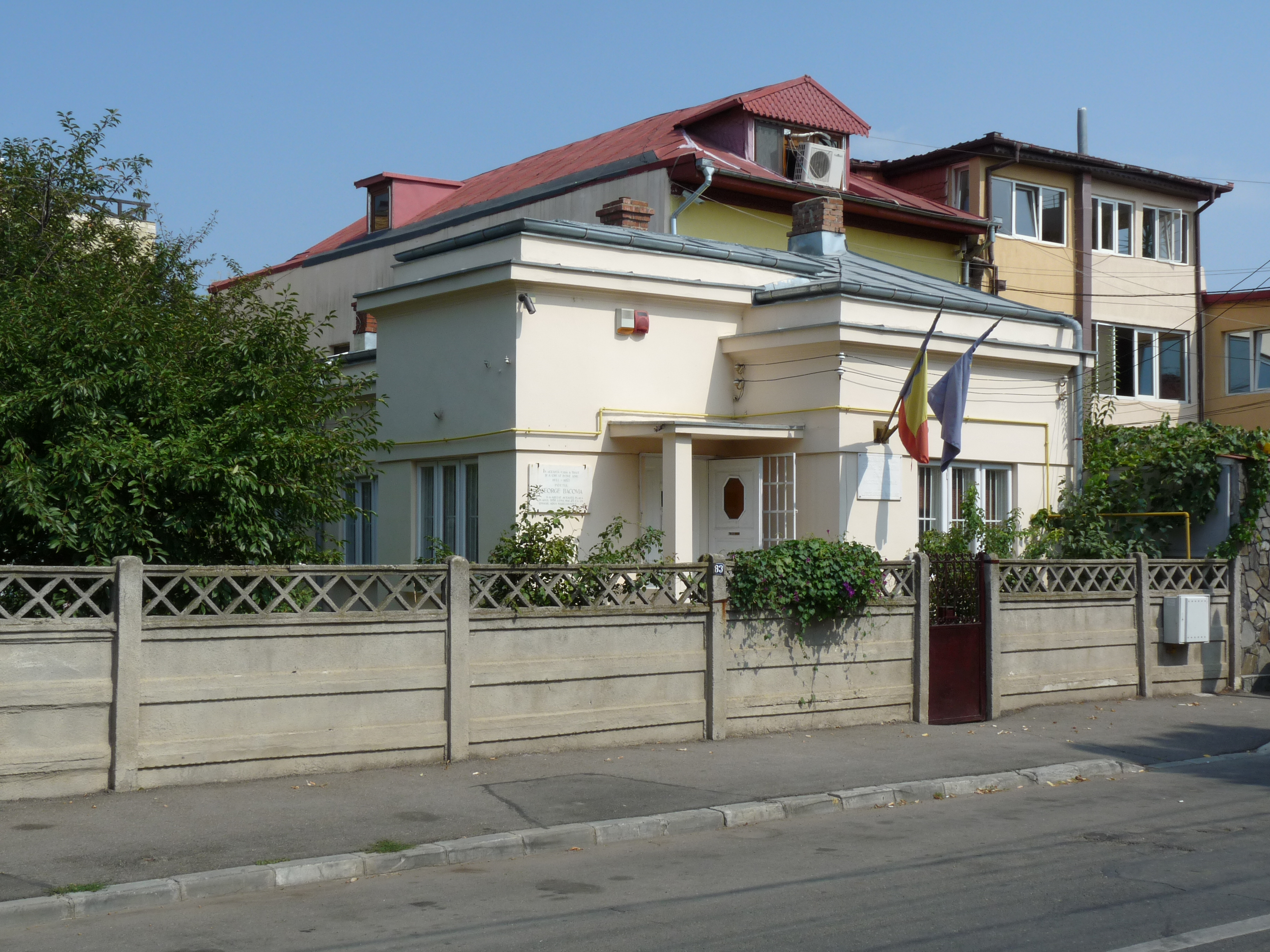
George Bacovia memorial museum
