= List of earthquakes in Romania =

Earthquakes in Romania
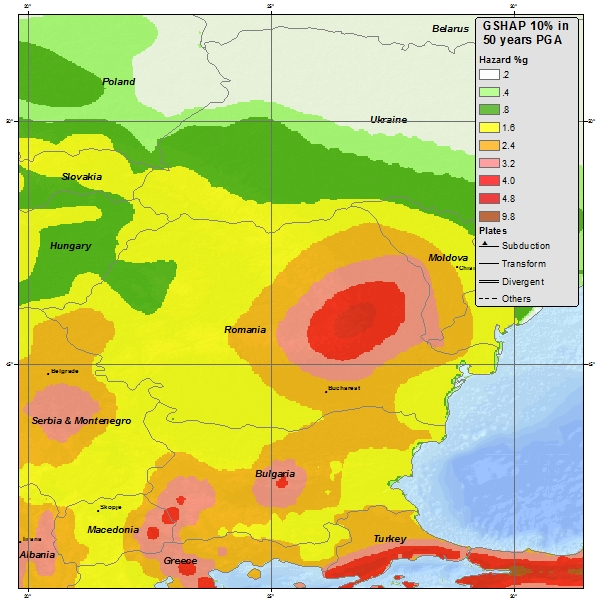
- Seismic hazard for Romania from the Global Seismic Hazard Assessment Program (GSHAP) in terms of peak ground acceleration with a 10% chance of being exceeded (or a 90% chance of not being exceeded) within the next 50 years
- Largest: 7.9 M_{w} 1802 Vrancea earthquake
- Deadliest: 7.2 M_{w} 1977 Vrancea earthquake 1,578 killed

This is a list of earthquakes in Romania, including any notable historical earthquakes that have epicenters within the current boundaries of Romania, or which caused significant effects in this area.

== Seismic hazard ==
The seismicity of Romania is clustered in several epicentral zones: Vrancea, Făgăraș-Câmpulung, Banat, Crișana, Maramureș, and Southern Dobrogea. Other epicentral zones of local importance can be found in Transylvania, in the area of Jibou and Târnava River, in the northern and western part of Oltenia, in northern Moldova, and the Wallachian Plain. The Vrancea seismogenic zone is the most important among these seismic zones, having in mind the energy, the extent of the macroseismic effects, and the persistent and confined character of the earthquakes that occur in this area. The Vrancea area is responsible for over 90% of all earthquakes in Romania, releasing over 95% of the seismic energy. Two belts of moderate and shallower seismicity are emphasized in the other regions of the country: one along the Southern Carpathians and the eastern edge of the Pannonian Basin, the other along the Eastern Carpathians that extends towards SE on the Peceneaga–Camena line.

During the last 1,000 years, according to historical data, it is thought that 17 earthquakes of 7 and over magnitude have occurred, which suggests a means for unleashing the energy every 58 years. Statistically, the magnitude 6 and over earthquakes in the Vrancea area occur approximately every 10 years, with magnitude 7 every 33 years, while those with 7.5 magnitudes every 80 years.

== Earthquakes ==
Earthquakes listed in the following tables include only M6.0+ events or earthquakes with significant material damage or casualties. All seismic events are shown in detail in the ROMPLUS catalog of the National Institute for Earth Physics. It collected information from the catalog of Constantinescu and Mîrza (1980) for the period 984–1997. After 1997, the catalog was permanently filled and updated with data on seismic events produced in Romania and around national borders.

Date	Epicenter	Mag.	Intensity	Deaths	Injuries	Damage
10 July 455						It destroyed several towns and villages in Transylvania.
543?–545?	(Bulgaria) Dionysopolis, Dobrich Province	7.5				Large tsunami on the Dobrujan shore of the Black Sea. The Roman fortress of Capidava, Constanța County, is destroyed.
August 815						Strong earthquakes, for five days, from the Balkans to the Carpathians, resulting in severe damage.
6 July 1092						Catastrophic earthquakes lasting eight days causes huge losses in the Tisza area, also affecting Sătmar.
25 January 1348						Large earthquake in the Danube basin. 40 shocks in one day, strongly felt in Hungary, Italy, southern Germany, etc.
5 June 1443	Pannonian Plain					Parts of the Royal Palace, walls of the Citadel of Angevins and many other buildings in Temesvár collapse. The St. Ladislau Cathedral in Várad is destroyed.
29 August 1471		7.1	VIII–IX			The church of Neamț Monastery and the Neboisei Tower of Suceava Fortress are severely damaged. In Brașov, a part of Mount Tâmpa slips over the city, and the citadel of Radu cel Frumos in Bucharest is reported in ruins.
24 November 1516	Vrancea County					Several houses destroyed and significant damage to surrounding wall of Brassó. Also felt in Suceava.
19 November 1523	Mediaș, Sibiu County	4.7	VII			Light damage reported in Meggyes. The pillars of Evangelical Church in Sebeș collapse. Album Oltardianum indicates 20 houses collapsed in Sibiu, while the Chronicle of Hutter reports many deaths among old population.
26 October 1550		6.5	VII–X			Large earthquake in southern Transylvania.
10 August 1590		6.5	VII–X			Large earthquake in southeastern Transylvania, with disastrous effects in Brașov, Râșnov, Sibiu and Mediaș.
5 May 1603						The strongest earthquake ever recorded inside the Carpathian arch. Also felt in Košice, Slovakia.
8 November 1620	Vrancea County	6.9	VIII–IX			
9 August 1679	Vrancea County	6.7	VIII			
18 August 1681	Vrancea County	7.1	VIII			The earthquake damages a dungeon in Suceava Fortress, in Moldavia.
11 June 1738	Vrancea County	7.7	IX–X			Main article: 1738 Vrancea earthquake Four mosques collapse in Nicopolis, the fortress of Niš, on the Serbian side of the Danube, reports significant damage. 11 monasteries, 15 houses, 15 towers and a church steeple collapse in Iași, while the walls and tower of the Prince's Court in Bucharest are destroyed.
26 October 1802	Vrancea County	7.9–8.2	IX	4		Main article: 1802 Vrancea earthquake Chronicles and records of the Orthodox Church indicate extensive damage to churches and tall buildings in Bucharest. This is the strongest earthquake ever recorded in Romania, known by contemporary documents as "great earthquake of Good Friday". Felt on an area of 2 million km^{2}. Despite its intensity, only four people were killed.
1 July 1829	Ier Valley, Szatmár County					Significant damage in Carei and Satu Mare.
26 November 1829	Vrancea County	7.3	VIII–IX			The earthquake occurs on Thursday morning, at 4 o'clock, causing great panic among population. In Bucharest, 150 stone houses are destroyed or severely damaged. Felt over a very large area from Tisza to Bug and from Mureș to the Danube.
23 January 1838	Vrancea County	7.5	IX	73	14	Main article: 1838 Vrancea earthquake 73 deaths were recorded across the country, of which eight only in Bucharest. In Wallachia, 217 churches collapsed or were severely damaged. A massive landslide barred the Bicaz River, forming the Red Lake.
13 November 1868	Vrancea County	6.4	VII–VIII			
10 October 1879	Moldova Nouă, Caraș-Severin County	5.3	VIII			The earthquake was followed by three aftershocks with magnitude over 4.1.
3 October 1880	Mihai Viteazu, Cluj County	5.3	VIII			
31 August 1894	Vrancea County	7.1	VIII			Occurred at 2:20 p.m. Underground noises reported in Panciu, Adjud and Focșani.
31 March 1901	(Bulgaria) Shabla, Dobrich Province	7.2	X			Main article: 1901 Black Sea earthquake A 4 m high tsunami devastates localities on the shore of the Black Sea. Large landslides reported in Dobrich Province. Light damage to buildings in Bucharest.
6 February 1904	Vrancea County	6.6	VI			
6 October 1908	Vrancea County	6.6	VIII			The earthquake had three explosive moments at an interval of three minutes. The last phase generated "frightening jolts" and "formidable underground rumble". It damaged old houses in Bucharest, eastern Wallachia and southern Moldavia.
25 May 1912	Vrancea County	6.7	VII			
29 March 1934	Vrancea County	6.7	VII			
10 November 1940	Vrancea County	7.7	IX	1,000	4,000	Main article: 1940 Vrancea earthquake This was the strongest earthquake recorded in the 20th century in Romania. Its effects were devastating in central and southern Moldavia, but also in Wallachia. The death toll was estimated at 1,000, with an additional figure of 4,000 wounded, mostly in Moldavia. The earthquake was felt in Bucharest, where there were about 300 deaths, mostly from the collapse of Carlton Bloc.
7 September 1945	Vrancea County	6.8	VII–VIII			
9 December 1945	Vrancea County	6.5	VII			
4 March 1977	Vrancea County	7.4	VII–IX	1,578	11,221	Main article: 1977 Vrancea earthquake 1,578 dead and 11,221 injured in Romania. 120 dead and 165 injured in Bulgaria. Two dead in Moldova. Felt from Rome to Moscow and from Turkey to Finland. A World Bank report indicates damage worth US$2.048 billion.
30 August 1986	Vrancea County	7.1	VIII	150	558	Main article: 1986 Vrancea earthquake Officially, two dead and 558 injured. In Chișinău, four apartment buildings collapsed, resulting in at least 100 casualties. In Bucharest, 50 workers were killed in the basement of a building, crushed by piles of rubble. The information was never confirmed. Over 50,000 houses were damaged.
30 May 1990	Vrancea County	6.9	VIII	14	362	Main article: 1990 Vrancea earthquakes 14 dead and 362 injured. Severe damage reported on large areas in Romania, Moldova and Bulgaria. Munich Re indicates economic losses of US$30 million.
31 May 1990	Vrancea County	6.4	VII			Main article: 1990 Vrancea earthquakes This was the strongest aftershock of the 30 May mainshock.
12 July 1991	Banloc, Timiș County	5.6	VIII	2	30	5,000 rural buildings and a monumental church of German architecture are damaged. 2 dead, 30 injured, hundreds to thousands displaced due to severe damage to buildings.
2 December 1991	Voiteg, Timiș County	5.5	VII		Some	Some injured, serious damage in Voiteg (5,000 houses), 4,500 displaced.
24 May 2002	Caraș-Severin County	4.7	V		5	Five people were injured and some houses slightly damaged.
27 October 2004	Năruja, Vrancea County	5.9	V			Old buildings were slightly damaged. Blackouts were reported in epicentral area.
22 November 2014	Panciu, Vrancea County	5.7	V		14	Main article: 2014 Vrancea earthquake Cracks in walls and roads were reported in Galați and Tulcea. Telephone network and power supply were disrupted in epicentral area. One man was injured in Tulcea. Eight people were injured in Galați and five hypertensive people in Brăila needed medical care because of panic attacks.
24 September 2016	Vrancea County	5.6	VI		2	In Iași, a young man jumped out a window, suffering a fracture, and an old woman hurt herself in her house, while 12 people suffered panic attacks.
28 October 2018	Vrancea County	5.5	VI			In Bucharest, an old house was slightly damaged. The Bucharest–Ilfov Ambulance Service registered 25 calls for panic attacks. Power supply was briefly disrupted in Întorsura Buzăului, close to the epicenter.
31 January 2020	Vrancea County	5.2	V			It happened at 03:26.
3 November 2022	Vrancea County	5.4	V			
13 February 2023	Gorj County	5.0	VII			Main article:2023 Gorj earthquakes A foreshock of the 14 February Gorj earthquake.
14 February 2023	Gorj County	5.6	VIII		4	Main article:2023 Gorj earthquakes 22 localities affected in five counties – Gorj, Dolj, Hunedoara, Mehedinți and Vâlcea. Four people in Gorj injured by detached construction elements. 48 buildings slightly damaged in Târgu Jiu, close to the epicenter.
18 November 2026 [58]	Vrancea County	5.3	VI		2	At least 2 injured in this earthquake, one in Galați and another in Râmnicu Sărat [2]. A building was slightly damaged in Brăila [3]. It was felt throughout the country and in other countries such as Bulgaria, Ukraine and Moldova
The inclusion criteria for adding events are based on WikiProject Earthquakes' notability guideline that was developed for stand alone articles. The principles described are also applicable to lists. In summary, only damaging, injurious, or deadly events should be recorded.

== Gallery ==
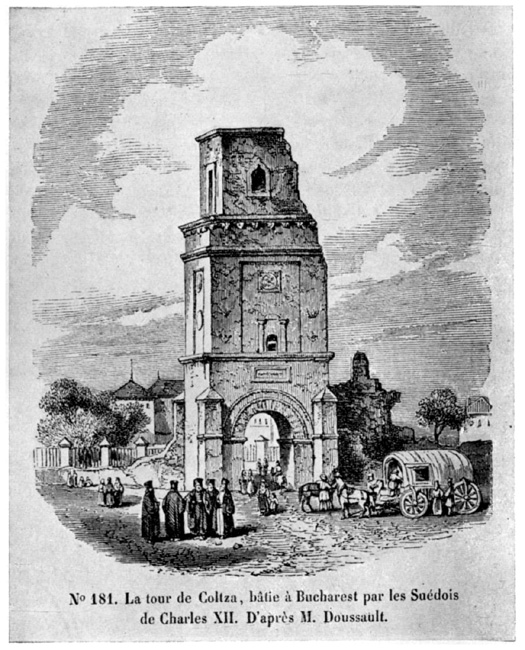
Turnul Colței heavily damaged by the 1802 Vrancea earthquake

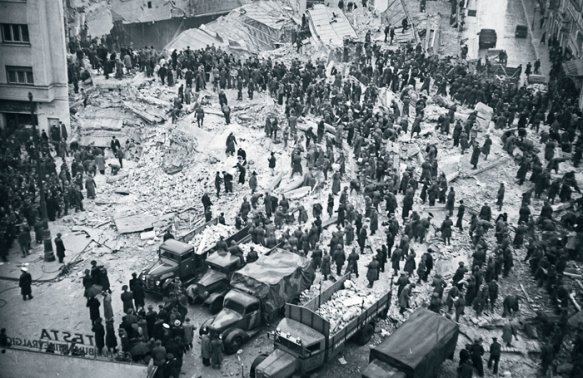
Rescue operations at Carlton Bloc after the 1940 Vrancea earthquake

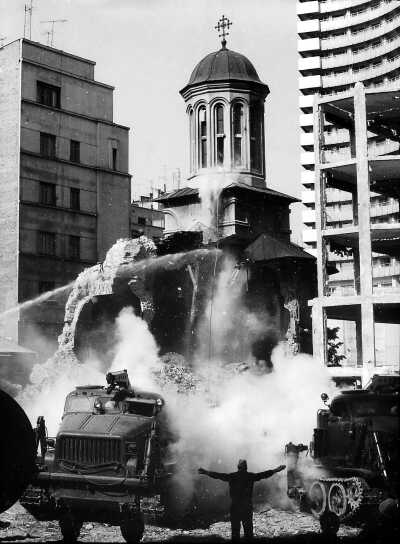
Enei Church was nearly destroyed during the 1977 Vrancea earthquake.

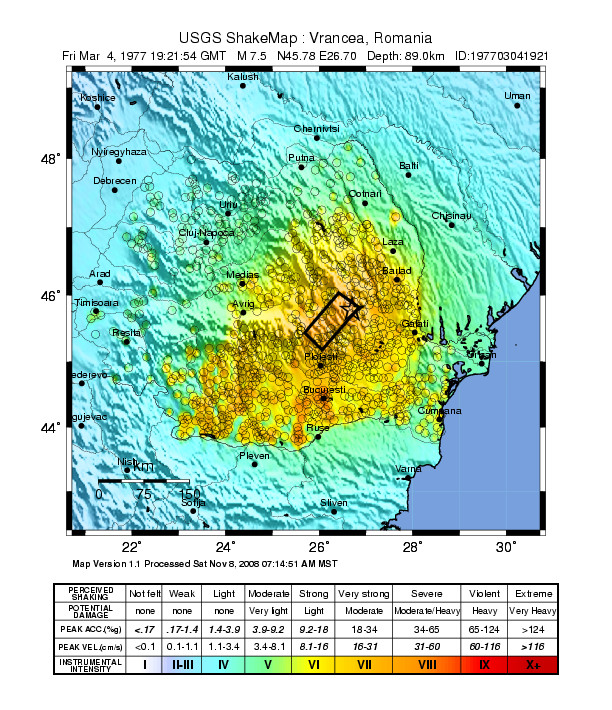
USGS ShakeMap for the 1977 event.

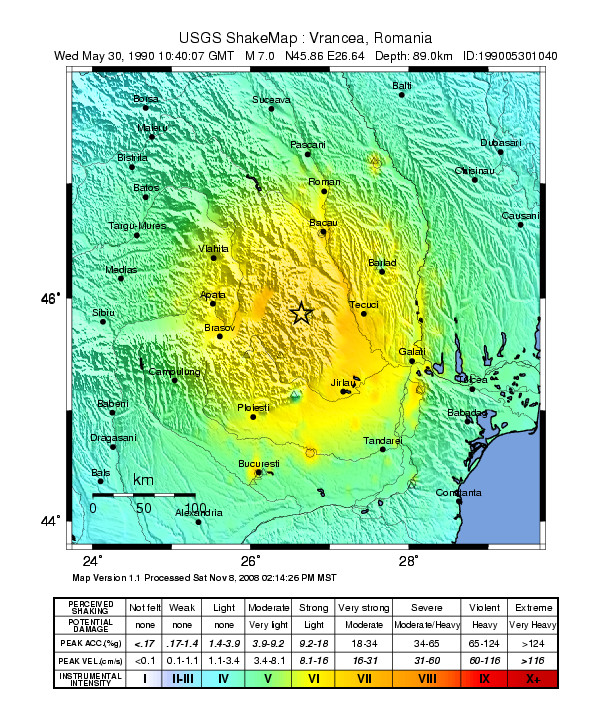
USGS ShakeMap for the 1990 event.

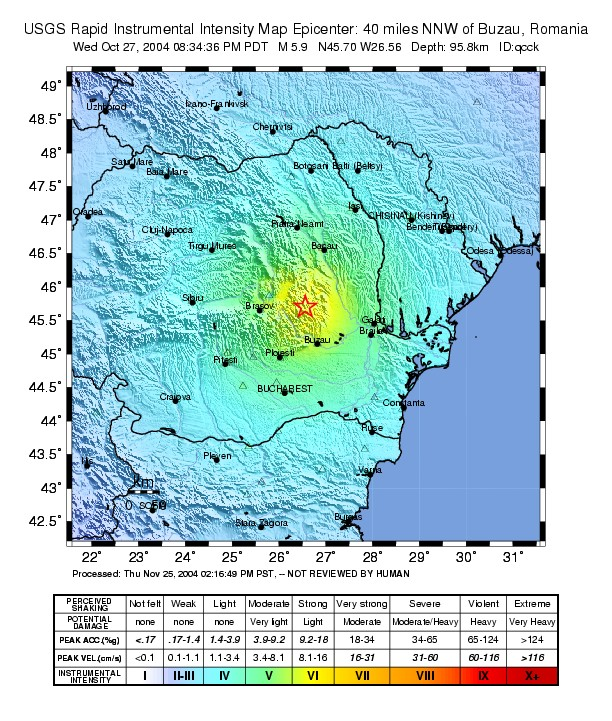
USGS ShakeMap for the 2004 event.

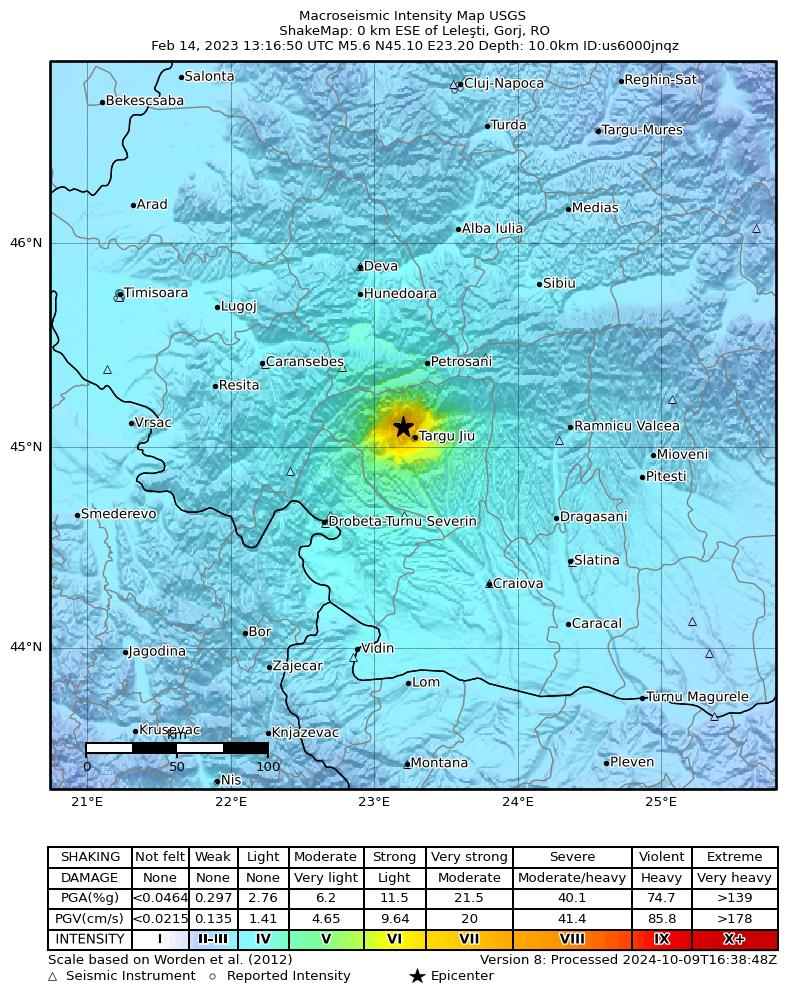
USGS Shakmap for 2023 event

== See also ==
- Geology of Romania
- List of earthquakes in Vrancea County
