= List of earthquakes in Vrancea County =

This is a list of earthquakes in Vrancea County.

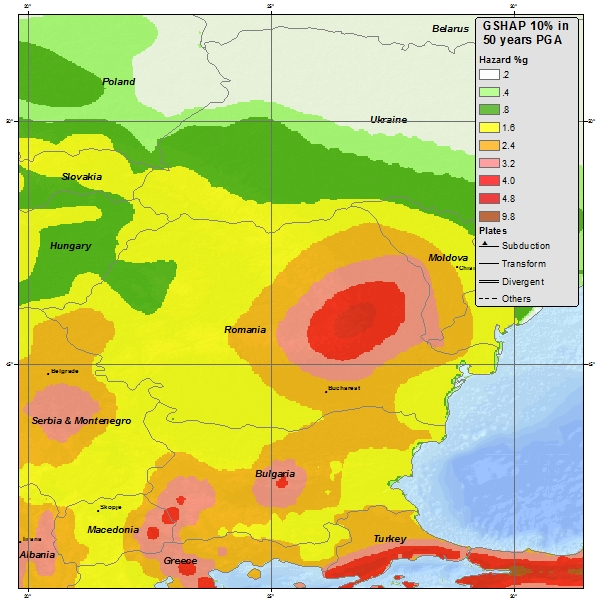
Seismic hazard map of Romania

Date	Local Time	Magnitude	Depth	Death toll
26 October 1802	10:55	7.9 M_{w}	150 km	4?
5 March 1812	12:30	6.5 M_{w}	130 km	?
26 November 1829	01:40	7.3 M_{w}	150 km	?
23 January 1838	18:45	7.5 M_{w}	150 km	73 (official); 720 (unofficial)
6 October 1908	21:40	7.1 M_{w}	125 km	?
10 November 1940	03:39	7.7 M_{w}	133 km	1,000+
4 March 1977	21:22	7.2 M_{w}	100 km	1,730
31 August 1986	00:28	7.1 M_{w}	131.4 km	150+
30 May 1990	13:40	6.7 M_{w}	90 km	13
27 October 2004	23:34	6.0 M_{w}	98.6 km	0
22 November 2014	19:14	5.7 M_{w}	39 km	0
24 September 2016	02:11	5.3 M_{w}	91.6 km	0
28 October 2018	03:38	5.8 M_{w}	151 km	0
31 January 2020	03:26	5.2 M_{w}	121 km	0
18 November 2026	02:48	5.3 M_{w}	120 km	0

- Note: The list includes only at least M5.0 earthquakes.

== See also ==
- List of earthquakes in Romania
