= 1738 Vrancea earthquake =

Earthquake in Romania

- Location within Romania Location within Europe
- Local date: 31 May 1738
- Local time: c. 11:00
- Magnitude: 7.5 M_{s} 7.7 M_{w}
- Depth: 130 km
- Epicenter: 45.7°N 26.6°E
- Areas affected: Romania; Serbia
- Max. intensity: 9.5 MSK
- Landslides: Yes
- Foreshocks: 8 May 1738
- Casualties: Unknown

The 1738 Vrancea earthquake occurred on 11 June [O.S. 31 May] 1738, during the third rule of Constantin Mavrocordat. The seism aroused great panic and is mentioned in several sources. It occurred in the lower lithospheric block, at a depth of 130 km (81 mi). Its effects were violent on large areas, the hardest hit being Bucharest, where several houses and churches collapsed.

The Romanian territories were not the only affected. In Niš, a Serbian city where the Ottoman army was quartered, the fortress on Nišava partially collapsed, and in Nikopol on Danube four mosques collapsed.

At an estimated magnitude of 7.7 on the Richter scale, the earthquake of 1738 is one of the strongest in Romanian history.

== Foreshock ==
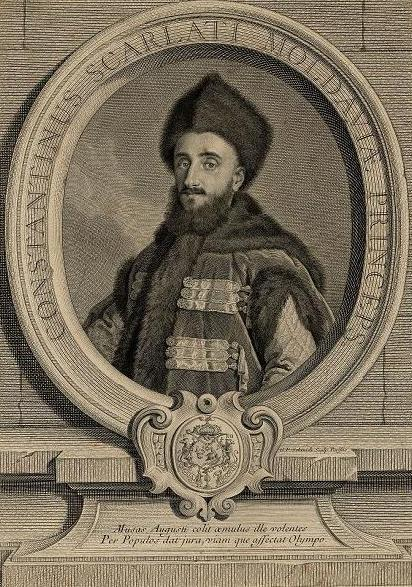
Popular tradition says that the maximum intensity of the earthquake was reached when Prince Constantin Mavrocordat kissed the icon of St. Paraskeva during his visit at a monastery in Moldavia

According to the catalogue of Cornelius Radu, several foreshocks of magnitude 5–6 occurred starting with March 1738. In a chronicle it is mentioned that a "large" foreshock happened on 8 May 1738. It occurred at "5 o'clock", but its magnitude is not known.

== Damage ==
The earthquake was felt especially in Bucharest, Iași, Focșani, Buzău, and Sfântu Gheorghe. In Iași, 11 monasteries, 15 houses, 15 towers, and a church steeple collapsed. In the Carpathian Mountains, several rockslides occurred, a large one in the Buzău River Valley. Significant damage was reported in citadels like Rupea, Șchei, and Prejmer, where walls and defending towers were destroyed or severely damaged. The seismic wave also affected the Neamț Citadel, where its thick walls collapsed.

In the chronicle of Constantin Dapontes it is mentioned that the walls of the Princely Palace in Bucharest were cracked. In a book of hours it appears that on 31 May the earth was shaken, and even "split and came out water with smell of gunpowder and brimstone". In the same book of hours it is mentioned that many arches and walls of monasteries and houses in Bucharest were cracked, while "outside" churches and arches have collapsed. A Slavo-Romanian psalter gives information about the intensity of the earthquake: "the earth trembled in the month of May, on 31, midday, very strong, and went to the east and again turned backward. And the trees were shaking, like the wind, and has destroyed homes and the earth made great noise".

In From yesterday Bucharest (Romanian: Din Bucureștii de ieri), George Potra reminds that the calamity "began with a great roaring". Many houses and churches were damaged and a "deep fracture" was open near Bucharest.

Academician Gr. Ștefănescu wrote in a study published in 1901 that, during the earthquake in 1738, church bells began to ring themselves.

== See also ==
- 1838 Vrancea earthquake, another major earthquake 100 years later in Vrancea seismic zone
- List of earthquakes in Romania
- List of earthquakes in Vrancea County
- List of historical earthquakes
