= Dudești Cioplea Church =

Orthodox church in Bucharest, Romania

- Biserica Dudești Cioplea
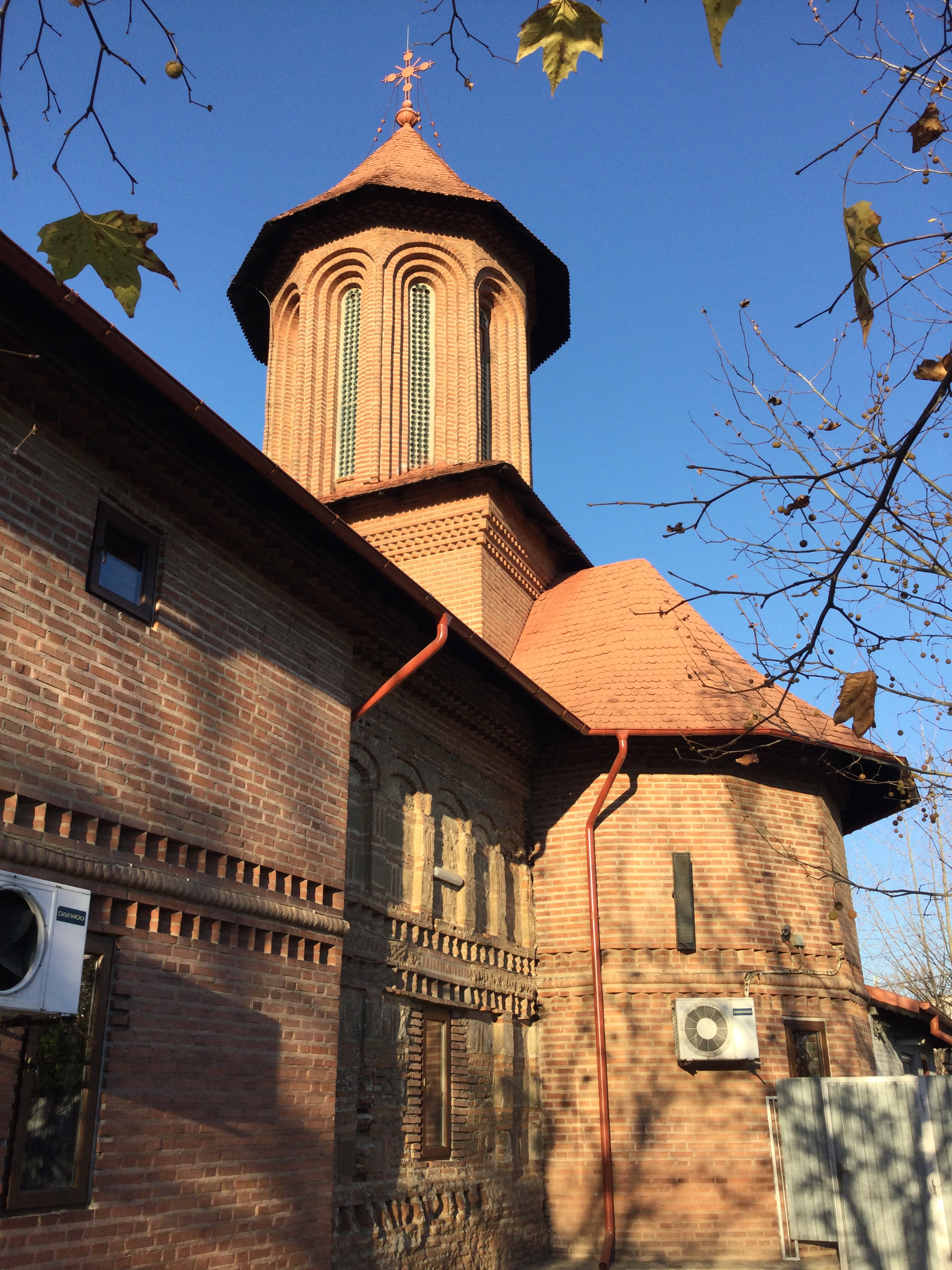
- Dudești Cioplea Church
- 44°24′35.8″N 26°09′38.1″E
- Location: 2 Credinței Street, Sector 3, Bucharest
- Country: Romania
- Denomination: Eastern Orthodox

Architecture
- Functional status: active
- Completed: 1820

The Dudești Cioplea Church (Romanian: Biserica Dudești Cioplea) is a Romanian Orthodox church located at 2 Credinței Street in Bucharest, Romania. It is dedicated to Saint Nicholas.

The church is located in the former village of Dudești, and initially served both the nearby residence of the eponymous boyar family and the villagers. It appears on a Russian map of 1770, dedicated to the Dormition of the Theotokos, and in an 1810 inventory. The old church, devastated by earthquakes in 1802 and 1804, was rebuilt in 1820 by the banker Ștefanache Hagi-Moscu. Again hit by the 1838 quake, it was restored by the parishioners, who added the nave apses. A fire in 1900 destroyed the archive; repairs were carried out the following year.

The church was restored between 1972 and 1983, following the plans of architect Constantin Joja. The aim of the restoration was to bring back the spirit of the original building, thus eliminating the innovations of 1820. Most significantly, a spire painted with Christ Pantocrator was reconstructed. The interior frescoes date to 1982, and another repair was carried out in 1990. The exterior is largely of bare brick, similar to the old church.

The bell tower is a separate structure next to the entrance, on two levels. Several stone crosses inscribed in Romanian Cyrillic testify to the cemetery that once surrounded the enclosure. The church is listed as a historic monument by Romania's Ministry of Culture and Religious Affairs.

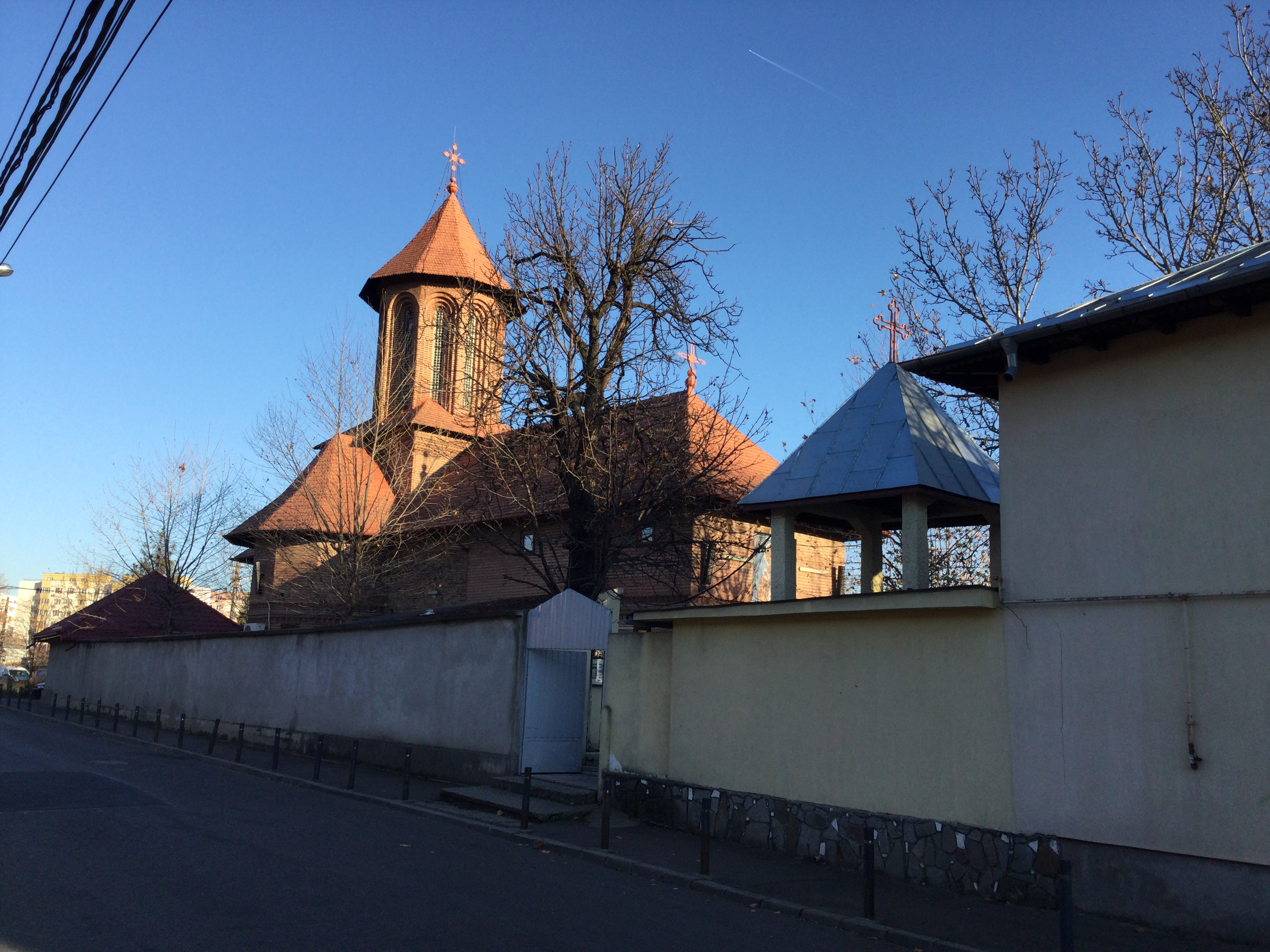
Street view

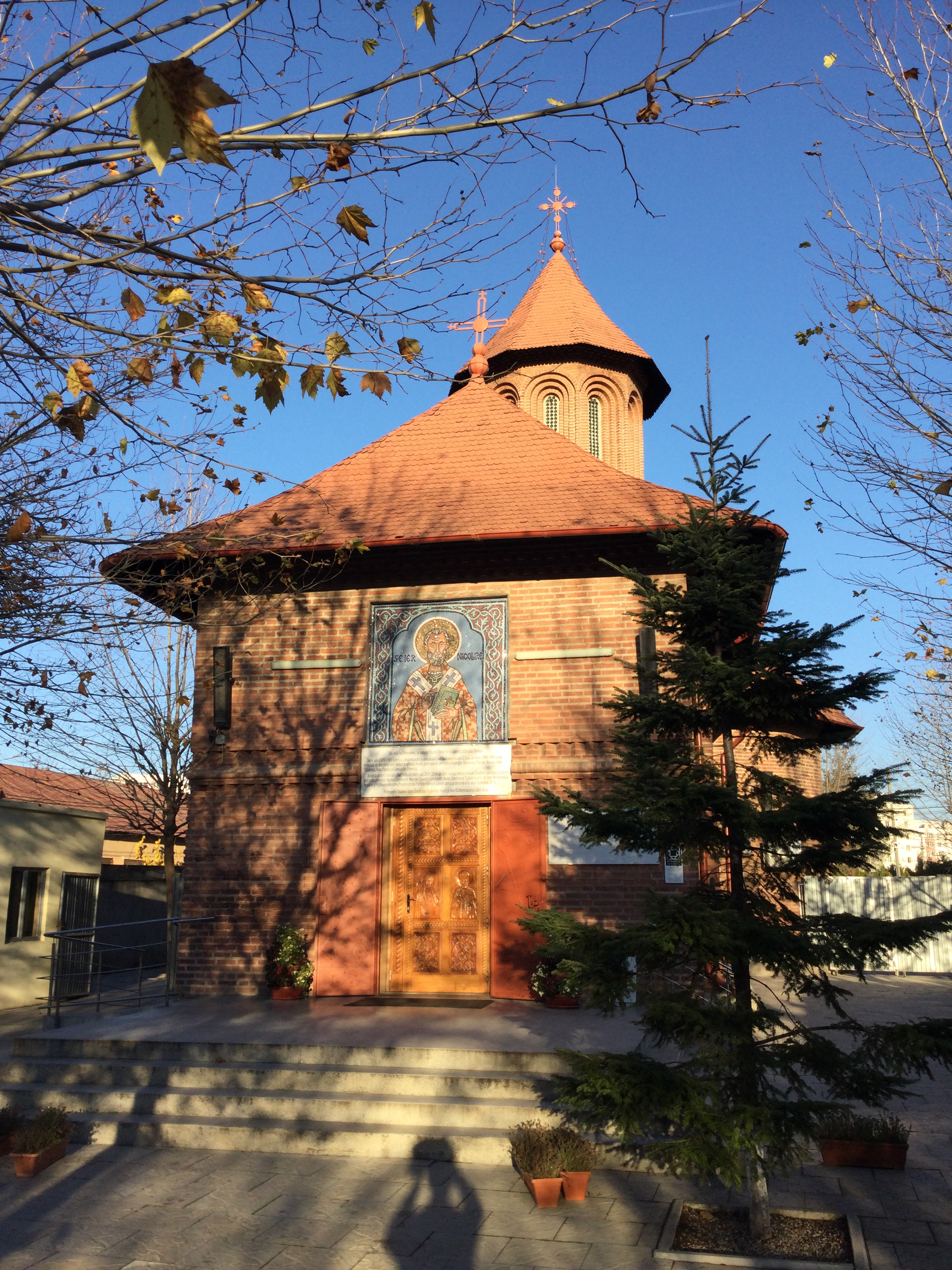
Entrance

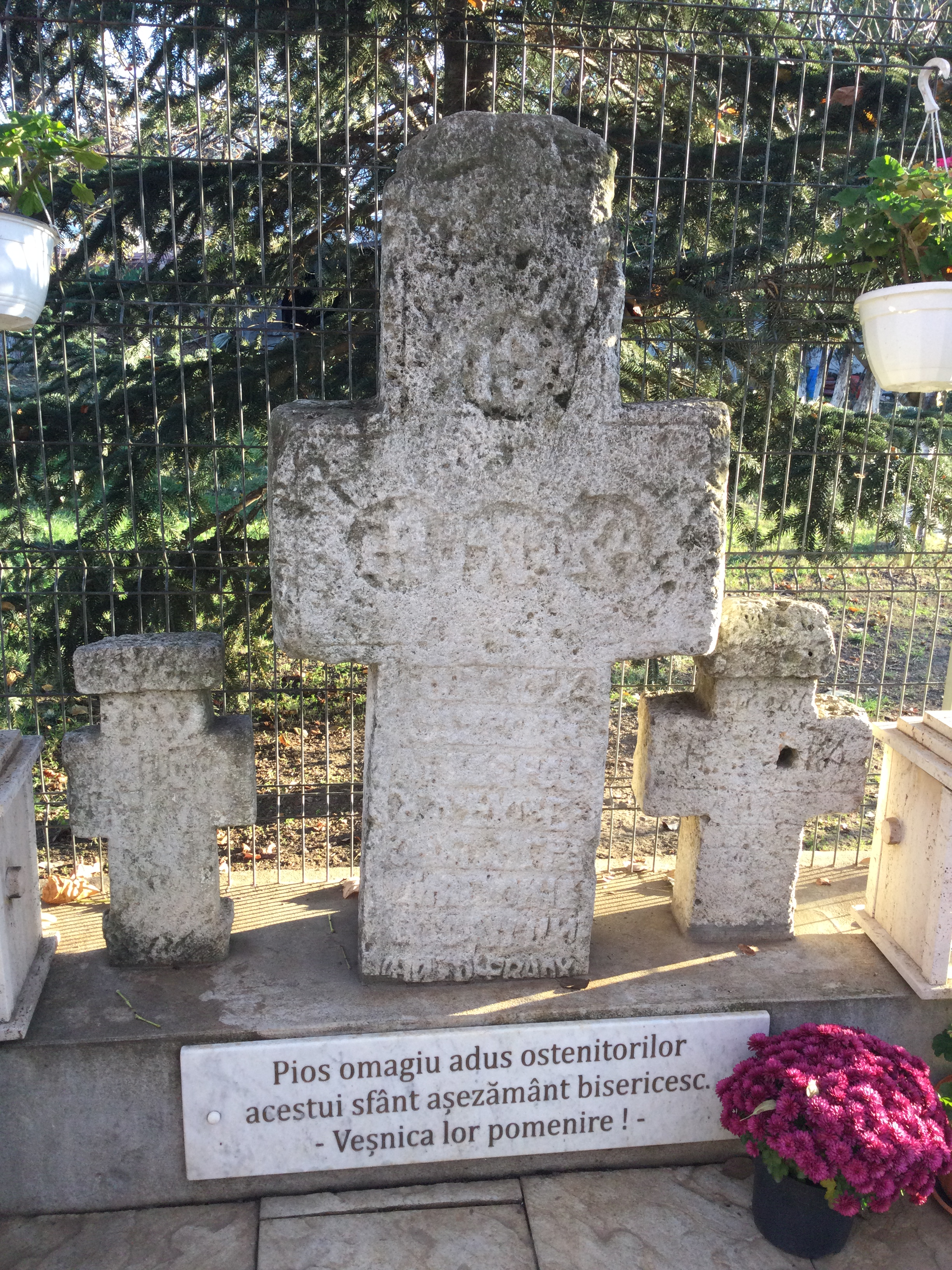
Old crosses
