= George Matei Cantacuzino =

Romanian painter and architect (1899–1960)

George Matei Cantacuzino (May 23 [O.S. May 11] 1899–November 1, 1960) was a Romanian architect, painter and essayist.

== Biography ==
=== Origins and early career ===
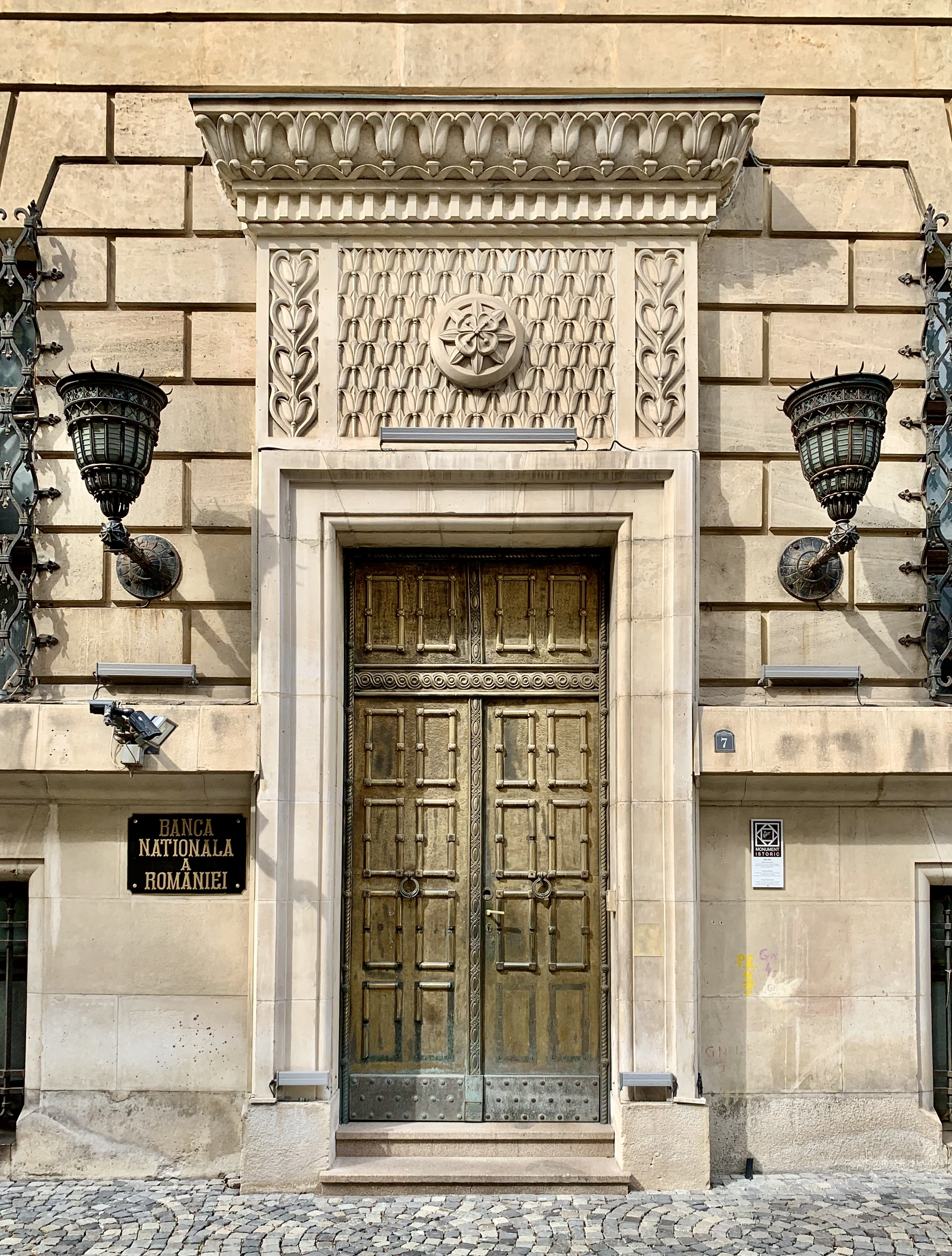
Entrance of Chrissoveloni Bank, Bucharest

A scion of two noble families, Cantacuzino and Bibescu, he was born in Vienna to Nicolae B. Cantacuzino and his wife Marcela Bibescu, the granddaughter of Gheorghe Bibescu. His father had arrived in the Austrian capital in 1895 to work at the Romanian embassy. The family lived there until 1909, when the elder Cantacuzino was recalled and briefly named a general secretary within the Foreign Ministry. As an adolescent, he attended high school at Montreux and Lausanne in Switzerland, spending his vacations in Romania, especially in the Moldavia region. He took his graduating examination at Saint Sava National College in the national capital Bucharest in 1916. He volunteered for service in World War I from 1917 to 1918, becoming the youngest second lieutenant in the Romanian Land Forces and taking part in military operations in the Carpathians. Demobilized at Iași after the end of hostilities, he rambled across Moldavia with his friend Horia Teodoru; the two recorded their impressions in a series of drawings that was soon the subject of an exhibition. In 1919, the friends left by ship for Marseilles and then went to Paris, where Cantacuzino met his father (still in the diplomatic service) after an absence of several years due to the war. In the French capital, they were joined by three other Romanians, including linguist Alexandru Rosetti; all became his lifelong friends. This nucleus was later joined by Ion Jalea, Horia Creangă, Catul Bogdan and Gheorghe I. Brătianu.

In July 1919, Cantacuzino was admitted to the École des Beaux-Arts, where one of his professors was the Fauvist painter Othon Friesz. The same year, he began restoration work on Mogoșoaia Palace, which belonged to his aunt Marthe Bibesco. In 1923, he and August Schmiedigen, with whom he had founded an architectural office, executed plans for the Chrissoveloni Bank Palace. Located on Lipscani, the building would be inaugurated in April 1928. Subsequently, Cantacuzino worked within the same office to draw up plans for a series of cule and country houses. At the same time, he wrote essays commenting on other realms of visual art, particularly within traditional Romanian forms. He published a substantial introductory text on architecture in 1926. The same year, he married Sanda Stirbey, also of noble descent.

=== Mature work ===
In 1928, while in Paris and Vicenza, he wrote a study on the life and work of Andrea Palladio; in Italy, he had undertaken minute research into the Renaissance architect's buildings. The book, which included twelve sketches by the author, appeared in French with a Romanian publishing house. His son Șerban was born that September. In 1929, he published Palais de la Banque Chrissoveloni in Paris. Prefaced with a letter by Georges Gromort to Cantacuzino, the book included sixty-four plates and a short introduction in which the author explained his architectural philosophy. Gromort commented that the architects had conceived a Palladian palace with a strictly utilitarian purpose, likening the neoclassical building to a palazzo of Vicenza. In December 1929, Cantacuzino received his degree from the École des Beaux-Arts.

Beginning in 1930, he began a sustained five-year period of architectural work in Romania, planning a number of important structures. These included the Eforie ensemble, the Industria Aeronautică Română hangar in Brașov, Casa Radiodifuziunii in Bod, the Tețcani church and several villas. In 1930 and 1931, he broadcast a series of lectures about Romanian architecture on Romanian Radio; these were later published. An exhibition gathering 62 paintings and 41 drawings of his opened in January 1931. Favorably received by Tudor Arghezi and Camil Petrescu, it was followed by several others. He published Arcade, firide și lespezi in 1932; the book received strongly positive reviews from Mihail Sebastian and Perpessicius. For a number of years, Cantacuzino continued to deliver radio lectures on Romanian and ancient architecture and art. Some appeared in the 1934 book Izvoare și popasuri, while others remain unpublished in the radio's archives.

From 1934 to 1940, he planned a series of buildings that raised him to the forefront of Romanian architecture. Among these were the TAROM headquarters in University Square, the Kretzulescu apartment building in Piața Amzei and the one on Dionisie Lupu Street, Flămânda Church in Câmpulung, the churches in Băilești and Seini, the Rex Hotel in Mamaia (together with Vasile Arion) and the rest cure house at Băile Olănești. In addition to his radio work, Cantacuzino remained in the public eye through a series of columns on Romanian art and architecture published in Revista Fundațiilor Regale. A tireless traveler in Europe and Asia, he published articles on Baghdad, Shiraz, the desert and the waters of the Tigris here. These were subsequently included in the 1938 Pătrar de veghe, reviewed by Sebastian and George Călinescu. His work also appeared in Revista istorică română and in the Parisian L'Architecture.

In May 1938, he took his first trip to the United States, and in December, held a radio program about the Romanian pavilion at the New York World's Fair. He returned to the United States in the summer of 1939, in order to attend the World's Fair, and again took to the airwaves on the subject. That autumn marked the first appearance of Simetria, an annual magazine of art and criticism that appeared in eight editions, through 1947. Cantacuzino was one of four editors, and his office and studio, at the corner of Calea Griviței with Calea Victoriei, served as headquarters. Over the course of the magazine's run, he published numerous studies, articles, reviews and notes. During the 1940 Vrancea earthquake, the Carlton Bloc collapsed, initially drawing the ire of the National Legionary State authorities against its architect, Cantacuzino. However, an inquiry determined that the building fell due to other causes, and he was not prosecuted.

From October 1942 to May 1948, he taught courses on the history and theory of architecture as a substitute professor of the University of Bucharest's architecture faculty. He wrote a column for Viața Românească between 1944 and 1946; there, Cantacuzino discussed the work of various painters, exhibitions and official salons. His Despre o estetică a reconstrucției, a passionate plea for humanism and patriotism, was published in 1947. The same year, he wrote a still-unpublished study on the historiography of Vitruvius. A dictionary of terms and concepts in Romanian and world art also remains in manuscript form. His residence in Bucharest was destroyed during the World War II bombardment of 1944. In the period immediately after the war, he continued his architectural activity, designing a number of villas as well as other projects, the most imposing of which is the Institute for Studies and Power Engineering building in Bucharest.

=== Under communism and legacy ===
In early 1948, under the new communist regime, Cantacuzino attempted to flee the country via the Black Sea. Arrested in March, several weeks later, he was secretly detained at Aiud Prison for nine months. He was then sentenced to five years' hard labor, which included time on the Danube–Black Sea Canal project, as well as stays at Pitești Prison, Jilava Prison, and a second period at Aiud. Freed in 1953, he was hired at the historic monuments directorate. For the next three years, he was deeply preoccupied with cataloguing Romania's old monuments. In 1956, he restored several churches in northern Moldavia. That October, an exhibition featuring 150 of his paintings opened in Herăstrău Park, with Arghezi delivering the introductory address. The crowds were so large that the authorities shut it down after a few days. The same year, while near Sucevița Monastery, he suffered a stroke that left him bedridden for several months. Consequently, he was accused of being an enemy of the people and fired.

Between 1957 and 1959, he worked on the Iași Metropolitan Palace. Cantacuzino was hired by the Metropolitan of Moldavia, but as he could not officially declare he had given work to the blacklisted architect, paid him a salary out of his personal funds. Meanwhile, Cantacuzino set down a series of personal reflections eventually titled Scrisorile către Simon. He died in Iași and was buried at Eternitatea cemetery. His gravestone was carved by the workers he had employed for the palace project.

Cantacuzino was initially consigned to oblivion, and the exile Virgil Ierunca made a first attempt at reviving his legacy. He published a Romanian-language volume of his writings in Paris in 1966, but its impact was not felt. A thorough anthology appeared only in 1977, but this did not include Scrisorile către Simon, which were only published in 1993, after the Romanian Revolution. This work comprises thirteen letters written between May 1955 and the winter of 1959, addressed to his friend Simon Bayer. The first seven, from 1955-1956, appear autobiographical in intent: the author alludes to their joint experiences as young men and their supreme self-confidence. The tone of the later ones, composed from 1957 onward, shifts. While autobiography is not completely abandoned, the focus is far more philosophical, featuring reflections on questions that had troubled the author throughout his life.

Cantacuzino's wife left for England in 1939 with the couple's son and daughter; due to the intervention of World War II and communism, none of them ever moved back to Romania or saw him again. Sanda Cantacuzino died in the 1990s, while Serban Cantacuzino too became an architect. The architecture section of the Gheorghe Asachi Technical University of Iași, which became a faculty in 2003, was named after Cantacuzino in 1992. Ion Mihai Cantacuzino, a distant relative, published a biography in French in 2011; this appeared in Romanian translation the following year as O viață în România. De la "Belle Epoque" la Republica Populară, 1899-1960.
