= Focșani =

- Municipality
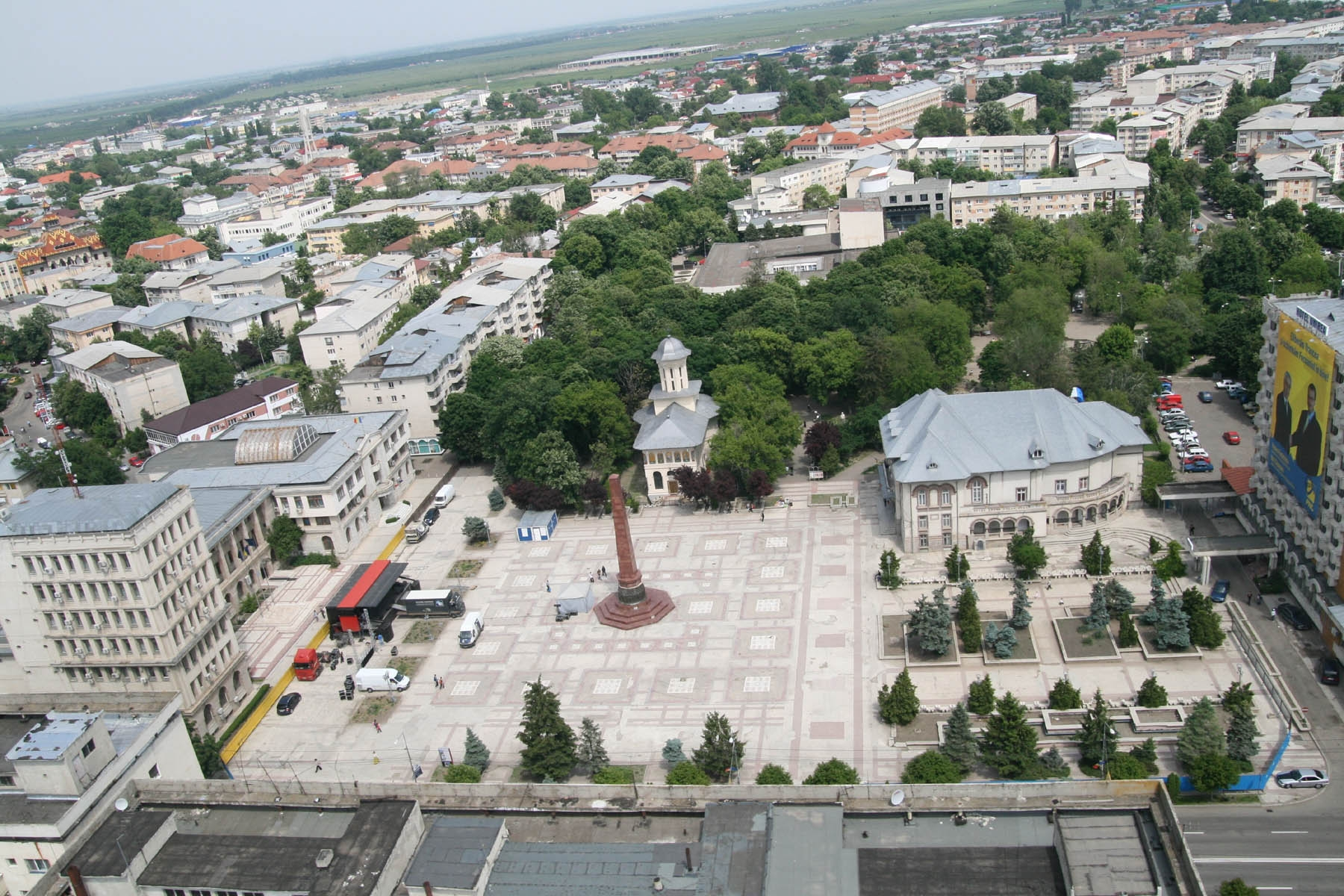
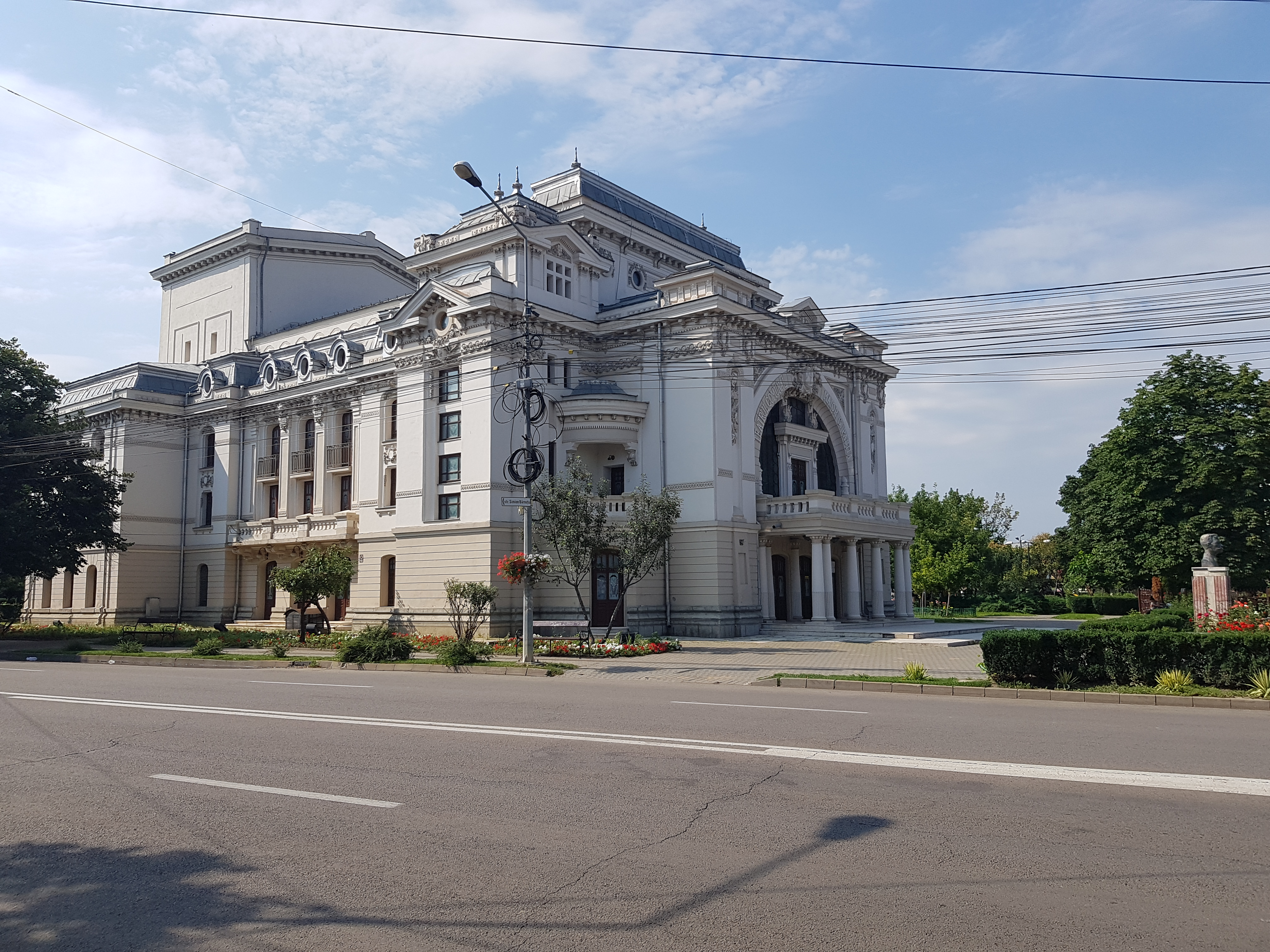
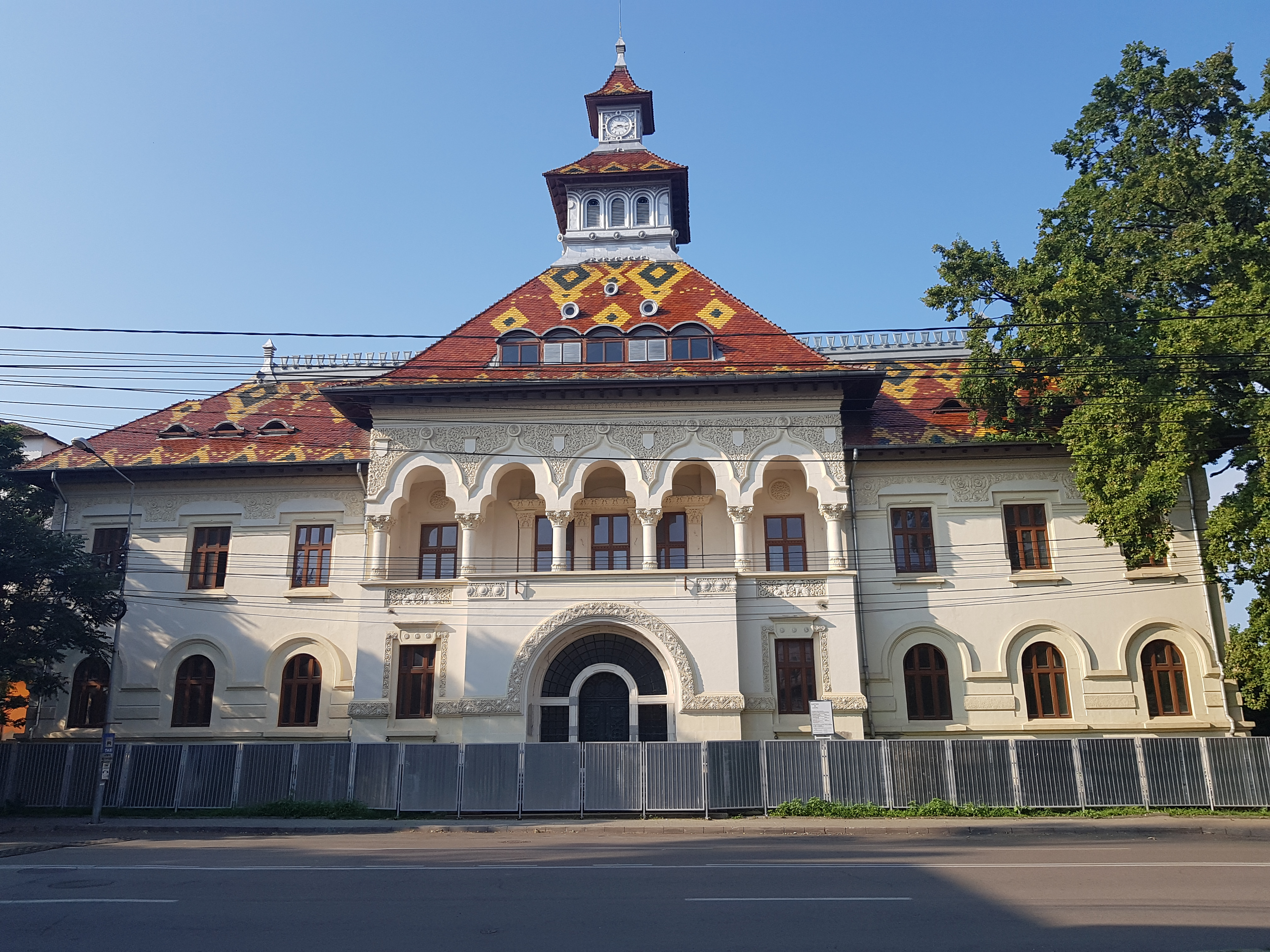
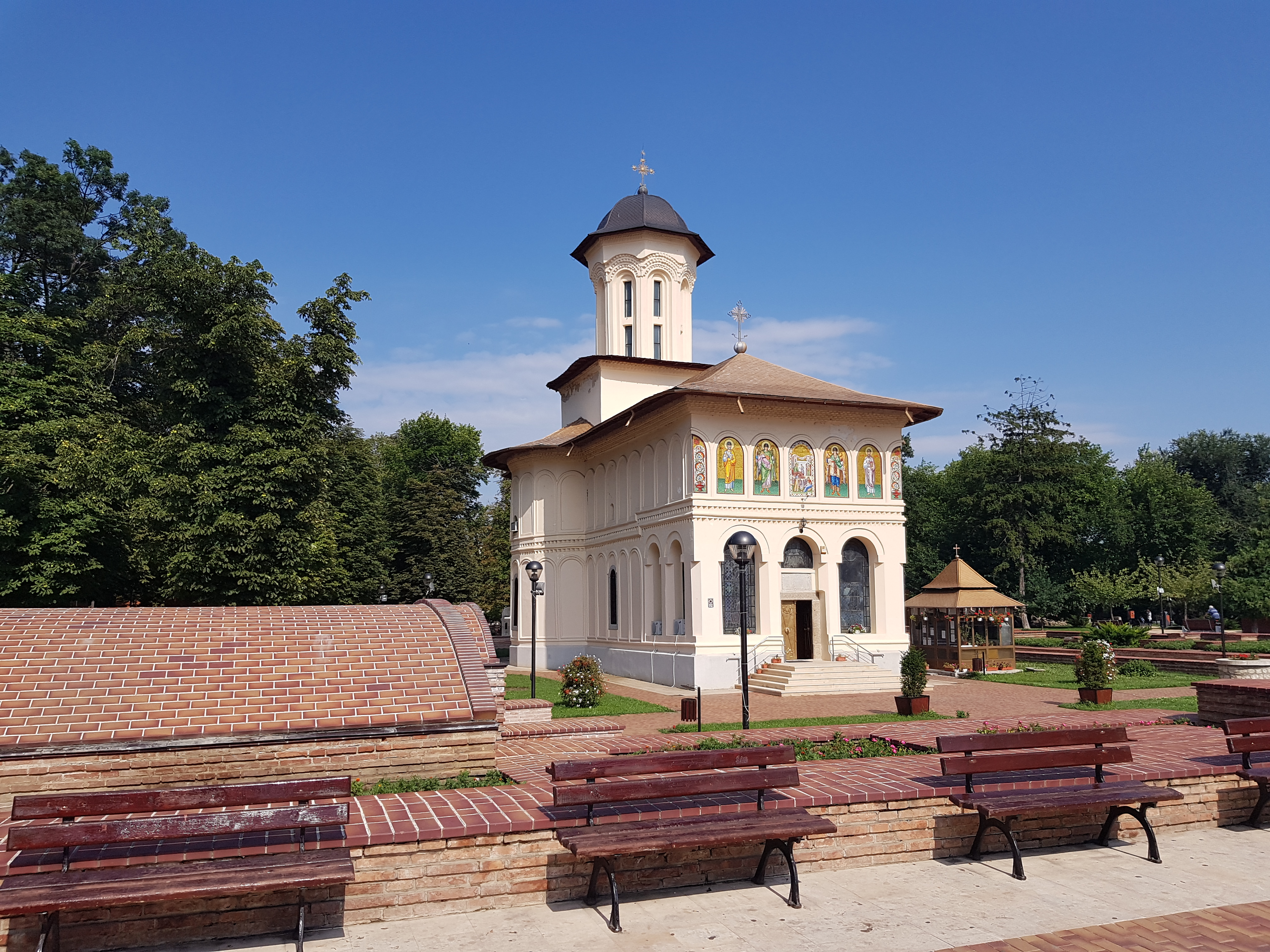
- Aerial view of Union Square Municipal Theatre Former administrative palace St. John the Baptist Church

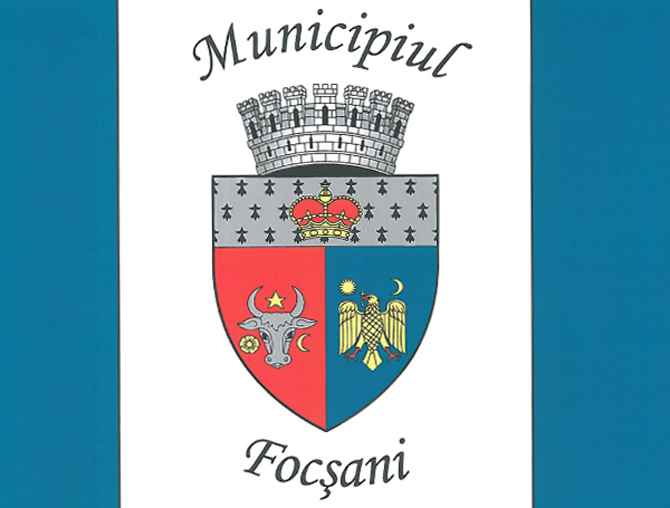
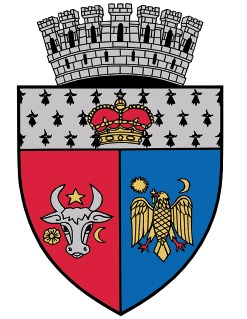
- Flag Coat of arms

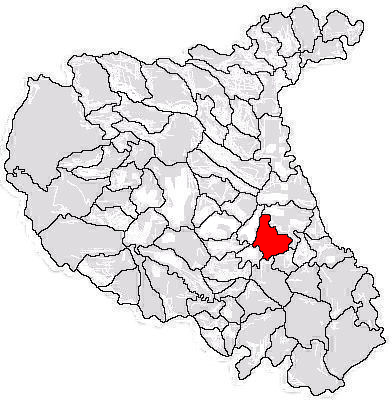
- Location in Vrancea County

- Location in Romania
- Coordinates: 45°42′0″N 27°10′47″E
- Country: Romania
- County: Vrancea

Government
  - Mayor (2024–2028): Cristi-Valentin Misăilă (PSD)
- Area: 48.1 km^{2} (18.6 sq mi)
- Elevation: 46 m (151 ft)
- Population (2021-12-01): 66,648
  - Density: 1,390/km^{2} (3,590/sq mi)
- Time zone: UTC+02:00 (EET)
  - Summer (DST): UTC+03:00 (EEST)
- Postal code: 620003–620177
- Vehicle reg.: VN
- Website: www.focsani.info

Focșani (Romanian: [fokˈʃanʲ]; Yiddish: פֿאָקשאַן, romanized: Fokshan) is the capital city of Vrancea County in Romania on the banks the river Milcov, in the historical region of Moldavia. As of 2022, it has a population of 66,719.

== Geography ==
Focșani lies at the foot of the Curvature Carpathians, at a point of convergence for tectonic geologic faults, which raises the risk of earthquakes in the vicinity. Though Vrancea County is one of the most popular wine-producing regions in Romania, Odobești being just to the northwest, in Romania, Focșani itself is not considered a wine-producing center. The wine sold as Weisse von Fokshan in Germany and some other European countries is generally a Fetească Albă de Odobești wine, and practically a second-rated wine which does not comply to the European Union rules of naming the regions of origin of wines.

The vicinity is rich in minerals such as iron, copper, coal, and petroleum.

The city administers two villages, Mândrești-Moldova and Mândrești-Munteni.

Focșani lies within the strategically important Focșani Gate. In the 19th century, the Focșani–Nămoloasa–Galați line was built to defend this area more properly.

=== Seismic hazard ===
The territory of Vrancea County corresponds to the most seismically active zone of Romania.

The earthquakes with the epicenter in Vrancea are caused by the movements of the nearby fault blocks. Devastating earthquakes measuring 7 to 8 on the Richter scale have been recorded in 1738, 1802, 1838, 1940, 1977 and 1986.

== History ==
=== Middle Ages ===
A small 13th-century fort discovered at Focșani has been suggested as a candidate for the civitas de Mylco (on the Milcov River), the seat of the bishop of the Diocese of Cumania mentioned in a 1278 papal letter (see Roman Catholic Diocese of Cumania: List of bishops).

=== Modern period ===
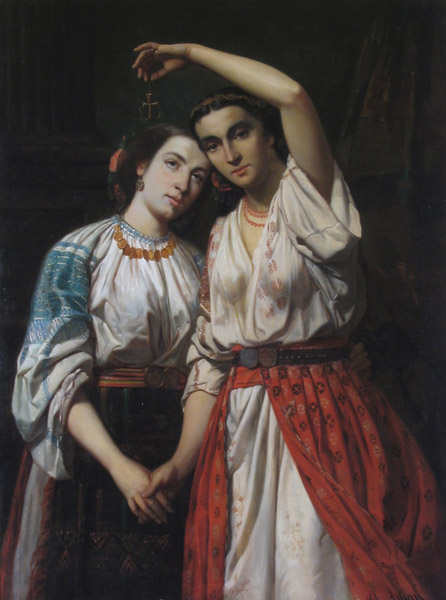
The Union of the Principalities, Theodor Aman, 1857

As a town on the Moldavian-Wallachian border, Focșani developed into an important trade center halfway between the Russian Empire and the Balkans. A congress between Imperial Russian and Ottoman diplomats took place near the city in 1772. Near the town, the Ottomans suffered a severe defeat at the hands of the allied forces of the Habsburg monarchy under Prince Frederick Josias of Saxe-Coburg-Saalfeld and Imperial Russia under Alexander Suvorov in 1789 (see Battle of Focșani).

In the 1850s, after the Crimean War, Focșani grew in importance as a center of activities in favor of the union between Wallachia and Moldavia, leading to the double election of Alexandru Ioan Cuza in Iași and Bucharest in 1859. From 1858, it housed a Central Commission regulating the common legislation of the two principalities, as well as the High Court of Justice. Both institutions were disestablished in 1864, after the establishment of a unified Romanian state. Focșani's role in the formation of modern Romania is commemorated by the Union Square Obelisk. Focșani was also proposed as a possible capital of the United Principalities, in part because of its location on the former border between the two principalities.

In 1917, during the Romanian Campaign of World War I, Focșani and Galați were part of a line of fortifications known as the Siret Line. The Armistice of Focșani was signed in the city on 9 December 1917 between the Kingdom of Romania and the Central Powers. Eduard Buchner (1860-1917), a German chemist and winner of the Nobel Prize in Chemistry, died in Focșani in 1917.

In 1944, during World War II, Focșani was intended to form part of the fortified Focșani-Nămoloasa-Galați line, where Romanian and German forces prepared to resist the advance of the Soviet Red Army. The defensive plans were overtaken by the Romanian coup d'état of 23 August 1944.

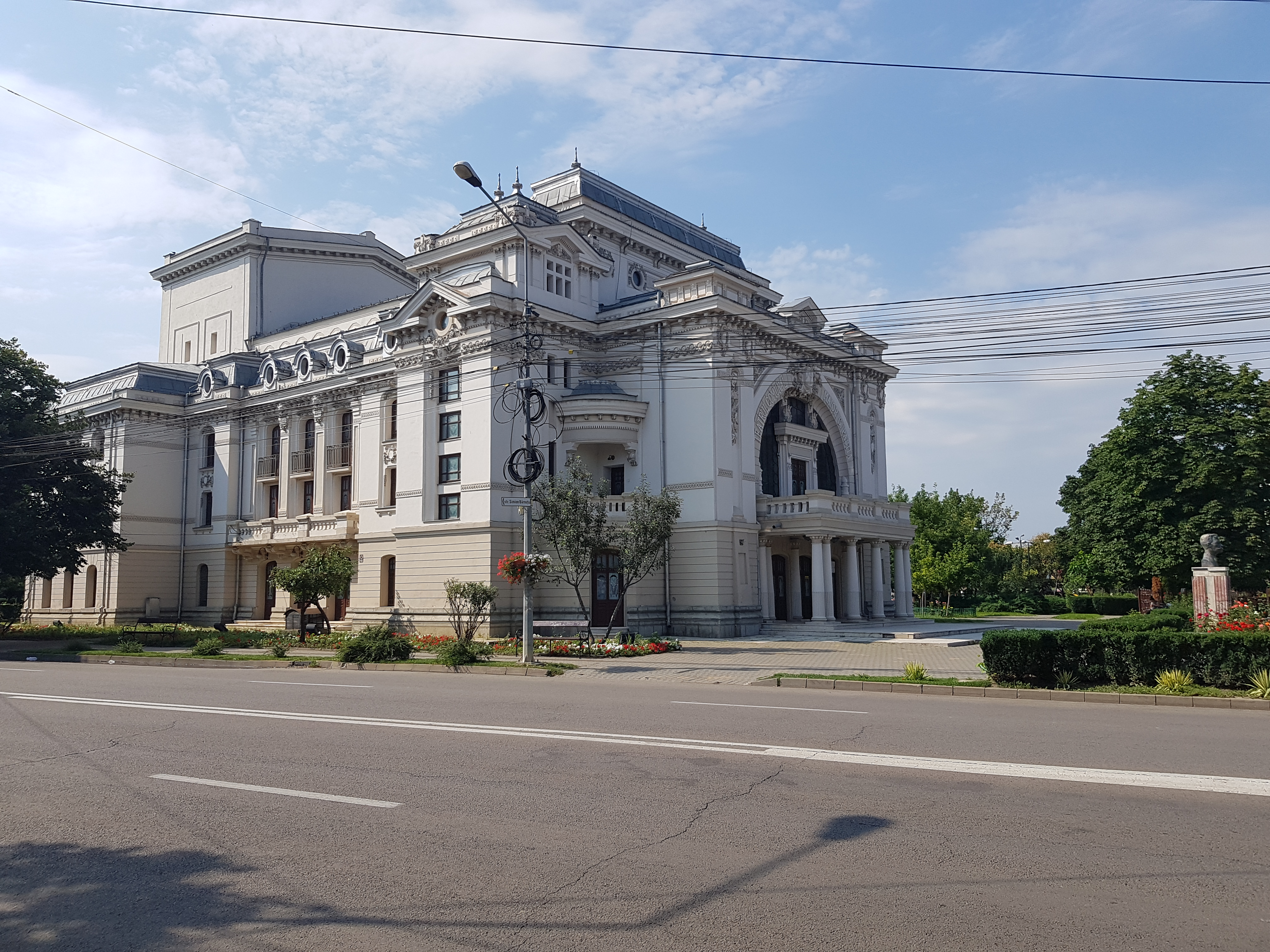
Focșani Municipal Theatre

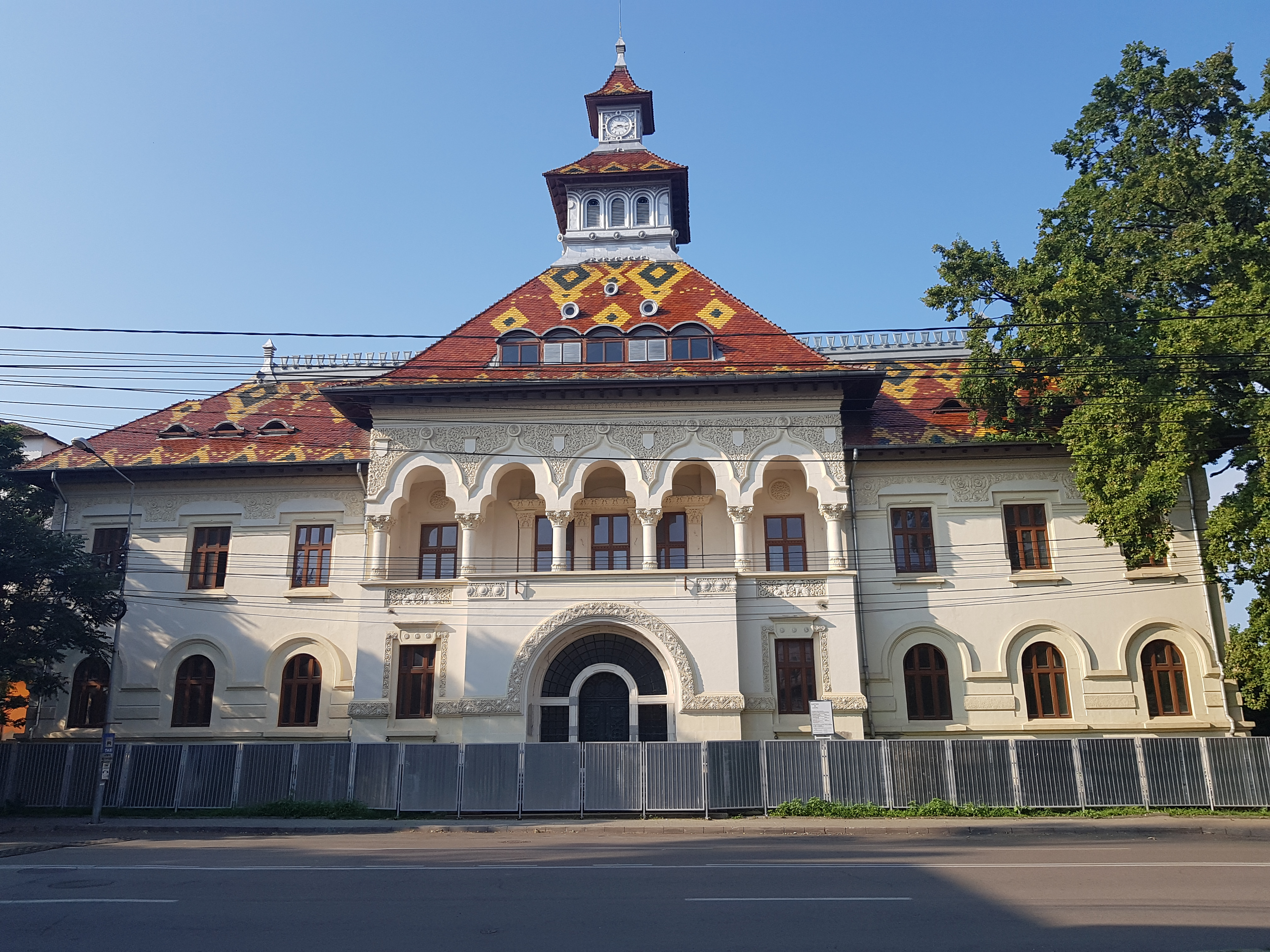
The former Administrative Palace in Focșani

=== Jewish community ===
The Jewish community of Focșani dates to at least the second half of the 17th century. Nathan Nata Hannover, author of Yeven Mezulah, served as rabbi of the town for about a decade. The community's first known cemetery was already full by 1683, and a second cemetery remained in use until 1874.

The community grew considerably during the 19th century. Twenty Jewish taxpayers were recorded in 1820, while the Jewish population numbered 736 in 1838 and 1,855 in 1859, when Jews constituted 19.2% of the town's population. By 1899 there were 5,954 Jews, representing 25.2% of Focșani's inhabitants, and the population remained at approximately 6,000 in 1910. Many Jews worked in crafts and commerce, including the wine trade. By 1910 there were 245 Jewish merchants in Focșani. During the interwar period Jewish entrepreneurs operated textile, soap and candle, and soda-water factories, as well as banks, bicycle shops and a mill. Jewish physicians and pharmacists also formed a significant part of the city's professional life.

Jewish educational and religious institutions developed alongside the community. A Jewish primary school opened in 1866, although it closed two years later following opposition from Orthodox Christian circles. It reopened in 1874 and had 274 pupils in 1887. Another school was established in 1897. Under Rabbi Iacob Nacht, who served in Focșani from 1901 to 1919, Hebrew education and Zionist cultural activity expanded. A choral synagogue was built in 1896 on the site of a synagogue destroyed by an earthquake two years earlier. On the eve of World War II, the community maintained eight synagogues, two primary schools, a kindergarten, a polyclinic and a mikveh.

Focșani also experienced episodes of antisemitism. In 1838, Jews were subjected to the discriminatory More Judaico oath, and a blood libel accusation occurred in 1859. The antisemitic newspaper Paznicul began publication in the city in 1900, while an organization established in 1910 promoted a boycott of Jewish merchants. During the 1924 proceedings against Corneliu Zelea Codreanu for the killing of Iași police prefect Constantin Manciu, antisemitic students who came to Focșani damaged synagogues, Jewish shops and other Jewish property.

Focșani played an important role in the development of early Zionism in Romania. On 11-13 January 1882, 56 delegates representing 29 Romanian towns met in Focșani at a congress presided over by Mosheh Halevy Goldring. The delegates advocated Jewish agricultural settlement in the Land of Israel. Later that year, 228 emigrants from several Romanian communities, including Focșani, sailed from Galați for Ottoman Palestine, where members of the group participated in establishing agricultural settlements including Rosh Pinna and Zikhron Ya'akov. The Focșani meeting preceded the First Zionist Congress at Basel in 1897 by more than 15 years.

The Jewish population declined during the interwar period, with 4,301 Jews recorded in 1930, representing 13.2% of the city's population. Jewish cultural life nevertheless remained active. Jewish periodicals published in Focșani included Torța in 1923, Unirea in 1924 and Acțiunea Noastră in 1925.

==== The Holocaust ====
The persecution of Focșani's Jews intensified following the establishment of the National Legionary State in 1940 and continued under the dictatorship of Ion Antonescu. The November 1940 earthquake damaged the city's two principal synagogues, which were subsequently destroyed by Legionary authorities on the grounds that the structures presented a danger to the public. Jewish-owned shops were forcibly taken over, and a number of Jews were interned at Caracal and Târgu Jiu.

In 1941, Focșani had 4,953 Jewish inhabitants, representing 10.5% of its population. Following Romania's entry into the war against the Soviet Union in June 1941, all Jewish men between the ages of 16 and 60 were confined in Jewish school buildings. Most were released after several weeks, but 65 prominent members of the community, including its rabbi and president, were retained as hostages. The number of hostages was subsequently reduced to ten, with individuals periodically replaced by other members of the community.

Jewish men were also subjected to forced labor, with residents of Focșani sent to labour camps or work sites at Vidra, Pitești, Vulturi-Doaga and Panciu. Jews expelled from Nămoloasa, Sascut, Mărășești and Panciu were sent to Focșani, increasing the demands placed on the local Jewish community. The community was also required to provide food and clothing for Jews brought from other parts of Romania to perform forced labour in the surrounding area.

Despite the persecution, the community maintained a network of welfare and educational institutions. After Jewish children were excluded from the public schools, a Jewish secondary school with eight classes was established; it enrolled 344 students in 1942. The community also operated a canteen that distributed 466 meals a day to impoverished residents and a 50-bed polyclinic in which Jewish doctors provided medical treatment without charge.

Focșani's Jews also provided assistance to Jews deported elsewhere by the Romanian authorities. In the spring of 1944, 210 Jewish orphans who had survived deportation to the Transnistria Governorate were brought to Focșani. The community assumed responsibility for their care, and some were taken into local families.

On 12 May 1944, as Soviet forces approached the region, the local military commander ordered Jewish men and women between the ages of 15 and 55 to dig anti-tank fortifications around Focșani. The Jewish population of the city itself was not collectively deported to Transnistria, but throughout the Antonescu period it was subjected to confiscation of property, detention, hostage-taking, forced labour and restrictions imposed specifically upon Jews.

=== Postwar Jewish community ===
After World War II, approximately 2,000 Jewish refugees settled in Focșani. The Jewish population reached 6,080 in 1947. Zionist organizations and youth movements briefly resumed their activities before they were dissolved by the communist authorities. Subsequent emigration, particularly to Israel, produced a rapid decline in the community. The Jewish population fell to approximately 3,500 by 1950 and to about 150 families by 1970.

By 1994, 80 Jews remained in Focșani, and YIVO recorded only 43 in 2004. The city's surviving Jewish heritage includes the Aha VeRe'eh Synagogue and Jewish cemeteries; a monument to Holocaust victims stands at the entrance to the newer cemetery.

Notable Jewish figures born in Focșani include Solomon Schechter (1850-1919), a scholar of the Cairo Geniza and a major figure in the development of Conservative Judaism in the United States; writer and humorist Cilibi Moise (1812-1870); physician Oscar Sager (1894-1981); poet Camil Baltazar (1902-1977); and writer Sadi Rudeanu (1924-1993).

== Demographics ==
Historical population
| Year | Pop. | ±% |
|---|---|---|
| 1859 | 13,164 | — |
| 1899 | 23,601 | +79.3% |
| 1912 | 25,066 | +6.2% |
| 1930 | 32,481 | +29.6% |
| 1948 | 27,960 | −13.9% |
| 1956 | 28,244 | +1.0% |
| 1966 | 35,094 | +24.3% |
| 1977 | 56,252 | +60.3% |
| 1992 | 101,335 | +80.1% |
| 2002 | 103,219 | +1.9% |
| 2011 | 79,315 | −23.2% |
| 2021 | 66,648 | −16.0% |
Source: Census data

According to the 2002 census, 101,854 people lived in Focșani. The ethnic makeup was 98.68% Romanians, 1.07% Roma, 0.05% Hungarians, and 0.2% others.

At the 2011 census, the city had a population of 73,868.

At the 2021 census, Focșani had a population of 66,648, of whom 81.91% were Romanians.

== Coat of arms ==
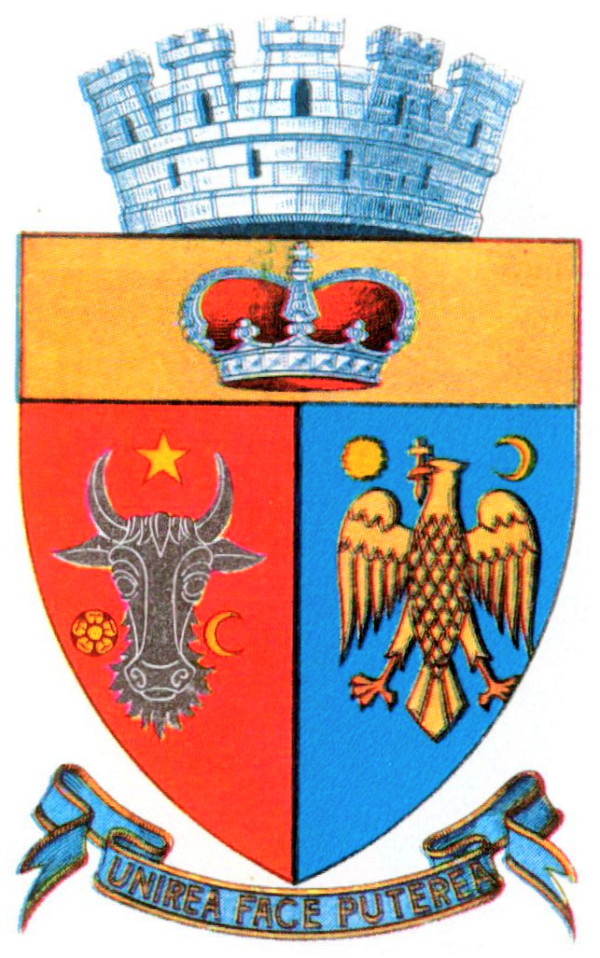
Coat of arms in the interwar period

Focșani's location on the Milcov, the former boundary between Wallachia and Moldavia, inspired the design of its coat of arms, which depicts two women personifying the principalities shaking hands as a symbol of their union, with the motto "Unirea face puterea" ("Unity makes strength").

== Natives ==
- Valentina Ardean-Elisei
- Adrian-George Axinia
- Camil Baltazar
- Ana Bărbosu
- Penait Călcâi
- Constantin C. Giurescu
- Simona Gogîrlă
- Carl Grünberg
- Leon Kalustian
- Dinu Kivu
- Petre Liciu
- Ion Mincu
- Cilibi Moise
- Alin Moldoveanu
- Ion Nestor
- Anghel Saligny
- Oscar Sager
- Solomon Schechter
- Moriz Scheyer
- George Simion
- Gheorghe Tattarescu

== International relations ==
Focșani is twinned with:

- Majdanpek, Serbia
- Tivoli, Italy
