= Camena =

Camena may refer to:

== Places ==
=== Romania ===
- Camena, a village in Cornereva, Caraș-Severin County
- Camena, a village in Baia, Tulcea County

=== Ukraine ===
- Camena, the Romanian name for Kamiana, Storozhynets Raion

=== Australia ===
- Camena, Tasmania, a locality in Tasmania

== Other ==
- One of the Roman goddesses the Camenae
