= 1990 Vrancea earthquakes =

Romanian powerful earthquake

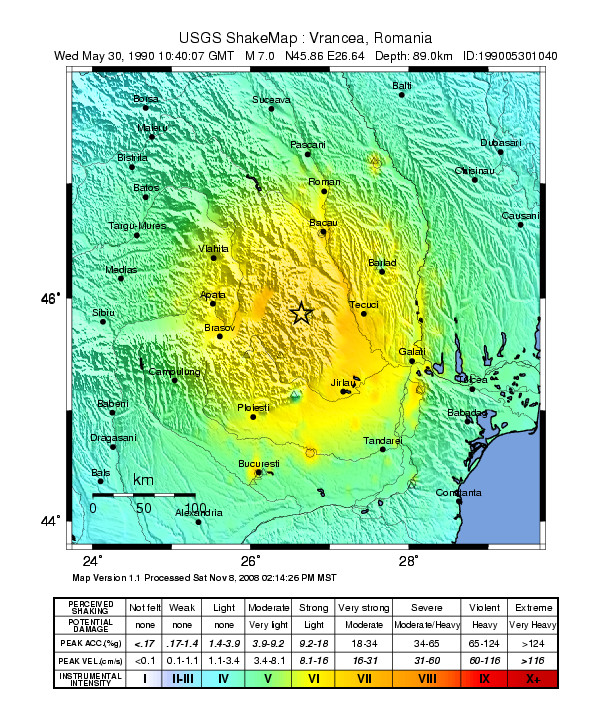
- Intensity map of the main shock
- UTC time: Doublet earthquake: 1990-05-30 10:40:06; 1990-05-31 00:17:48
- ISC event: 370780; 370841
- USGS-ANSS: ComCat; ComCat
- Local date: 30/31 May 1990
- Local time: 13:40; 03:17
- Magnitude: 7.0 M_{s}^{(HRV)}; 6.2 M_{s}^{(HRV)}
- Depth: 89 km (55 mi)
- Areas affected: Romania; Bulgaria; Soviet Union (Moldova, Ukraine)
- Total damage: 16 million US$ in Romania; 2 million US$ in Bulgaria; 2 million US$ in Moldova; 24 million US$ insured losses in Romania
- Max. intensity: MMI VI (Strong)
- Landslides: Yes
- Aftershocks: 80
- Casualties: 14 dead, 362 injured

The 1990 Vrancea earthquakes were three earthquakes on 30 and 31 May 1990 with magnitudes of 7.0 M_{w} and 6.2 M_{w} that struck the Romanian county of Vrancea, on two consecutive days. Severe damage in the Bucharest-Brăila-Brașov area was reported and dozens of casualties in Romania and neighbouring Moldova, Ukraine and Bulgaria.

The seismic doublet of May 1990 consisted of two mainshocks occurred at a distance of only 13 hours. The first mainshock took place in the afternoon of 30 May 1990, at 13:40:06 (local hour). The epicenter was located in the northeastern part of the Vrancea Mountains (45.9°N 26.9°E), at a depth of 89 km. The earthquake had a magnitude of M_{GR} 6.7 or M_{w} 6.9, the intensity in the epicentral area being of VIII degrees on the Mercalli intensity scale, and VII degrees in Bucharest. On the morning of 31 May 1990, at 3:17 (local hour), occurred the second mainshock, at a depth of 79–86 km, having the magnitude M_{GR} 6.1 or M_{w} 6.3. The event was felt in the epicentral area with an intensity of VII degrees on the Mercalli intensity scale, and VI degrees in Bucharest; likewise, the quake was felt strong enough in Dobruja.

In the USGS EXPO-CAT database it is estimated that during this earthquake 355,000 people were exposed to intensity VII, of which around 61% were in rural areas.

== Aftershocks ==
The first mainshock was followed by several aftershocks with magnitudes ranging between 3–4.5 degrees on the Richter scale, reported in the afternoon and evening of 30 May.

On the morning of 31 May 1990, continued the replicas of the two mainshocks. Thus, at 7:48 (local hour) occurred a replica of magnitude 4.7, felt in Bucharest with an intensity of IV degrees on the Mercalli intensity scale. Other replicas of lower magnitudes continued to occur in Vrancea until the end of June 1990, in the depth floor of 70–90 km. Secondary seismic movements, at the same depth, were recorded and later, until October 1990.

== Damage ==
Economic losses have been reported by Munich Re to be in the region of 30 million US$. In Moldova, the earthquake caused damage to property worth 100 million rubles.

== Casualties ==
According to data from the General Inspectorate of Police, the earthquake killed nine people. Two of the deaths occurred in Bucharest in the district of Colentina, when the heavy plasterboard of an 11-storey apartment block collapsed along the expansion joint, due to pounding between the two separate parts of the structure. A total of 362 people were injured in total; 100 of them seriously. The injuries and deaths occurred as a result of falling chimneys and falling debris.

In Moldovan SSR, four people died, dozens were injured, and many buildings were damaged, and in northern Bulgaria, one person died of a heart attack and extensive damage occurred.

== See also ==
- List of earthquakes in 1990
- List of earthquakes in Romania
- List of earthquakes in Bulgaria

== Sources ==
- International Seismological Centre. ISC-EHB Bulletin. Thatcham, United Kingdom.
- ANSS. "Vrancea 1990a". Comprehensive Catalog. U.S. Geological Survey.
- ANSS. "Vrancea 1990b". Comprehensive Catalog. U.S. Geological Survey.
