= 2023 Gorj earthquakes =

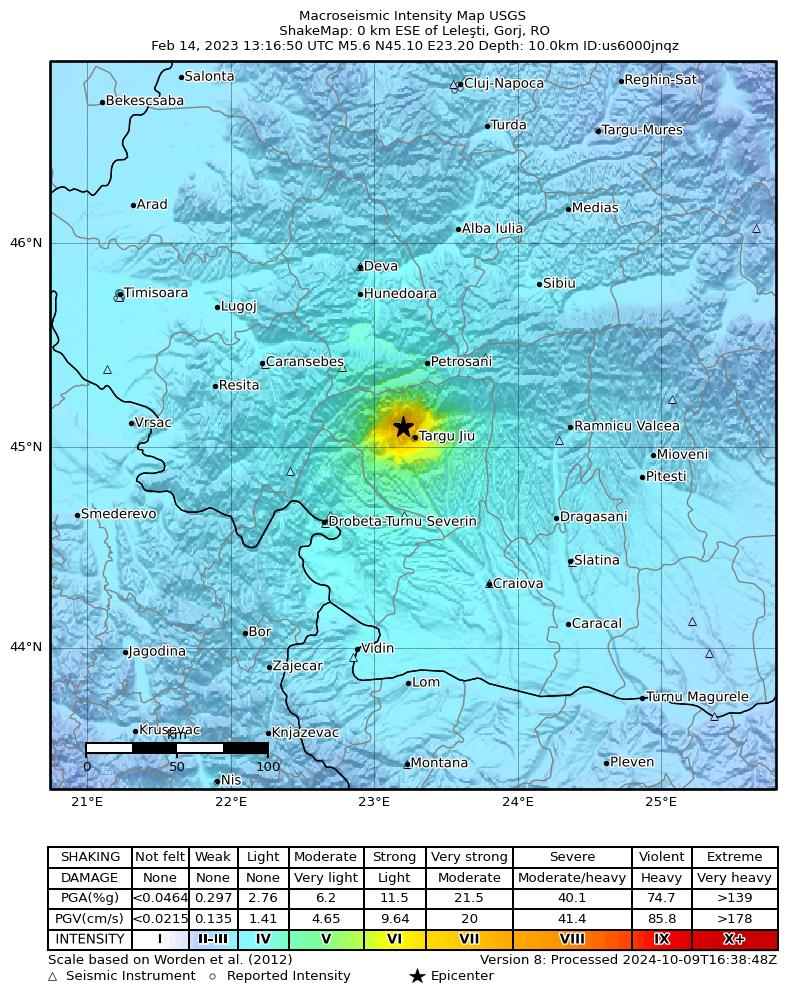
- UTC time: 2023-02-14 13:16:52
- ISC event
- USGS-ANSS
- Local date: 13–14 February 2023
- Local time: 16:58:09 (Feb 13) 15:16:52 (Feb 14)
- Duration: Variable
- Magnitude: 5.2 M_{L} (13 February Foreshock) 5.7 M_{L} (14 February Mainshock)
- Depth: 18.3 kilometres (11.4 mi) (Foreshock) 6.3 kilometres (3.9 mi) (Mainshock)
- Epicenter: 45.16°N 23.13°E
- Areas affected: Romania; Bulgaria; Serbia
- Total damage: Moderate structural damage to buildings
- Max. intensity: MMI VIII (Severe)
- Casualties: 19 injured (15 indirect)

The 2023 Gorj earthquakes occurred on 13–14 February 2023, with the mainshock striking on 14 February at 15:16 local time, and were felt throughout the western Balkans. The mainshock had a magnitude of 5.7 M_L, making it the most powerful earthquake historically recorded in the Gorj County region. The hypocenter was situated in the Oltenia region at a shallow depth of 6.3 km, following a 5.2 M_L foreshock the previous day at a depth of 18.3 km.

At least 484 houses and two churches were damaged in Gorj County; 19 other buildings were affected in Dolj, Hunedoara and Mehedinți counties. Rockslides happened in the Defileul Jiului National Park, and Nineteen people injured; four of them were because from fleeing in panic or falling debris, and the other 15 were treated for panic attacks.
