= 1940 Vrancea earthquake =

1940 earthquake in eastern Romania

- Location within Romania
- UTC time: 1940-11-10 01:39:05
- ISC event: 901696
- USGS-ANSS: ComCat
- Local date: 10 November 1940
- Local time: 03:39:05 (EET)
- Magnitude: 7.7 M_{w}
- Depth: 133 km
- Epicenter: 45.753°N 26.932°E
- Areas affected: Romania, Moldova
- Total damage: 65,000 homes destroyed
- Max. intensity: MMI X (Extreme)
- Landslides: Yes
- Foreshocks: 6.5 M_{w} (22 October, 8:37 am)
- Aftershocks: 5.5 M_{w} (11 November, 8:34 am)
- Casualties: 1,000 dead, 4,000 injured (USGS); 593 dead, 1,271 injured Romania, 78 dead Moldova (URBAN-INCERC)

The 1940 Vrancea earthquake, also known as the 1940 Bucharest earthquake, (Romanian: Cutremurul din 1940) occurred on Sunday, 10 November 1940, in Romania, at 03:39 (local time), when the majority of the population was at home.

The 1940 earthquake registered a magnitude of 7.7 on the moment magnitude scale, being the strongest earthquake recorded in the 20th century in Romania. Its epicenter lay in the Vrancea zone at a depth of about 133 km. The area of maximum intensity for this earthquake was 80,000 km^{2} and macroseismic effects were felt over an area of more than 2,000,000 km^{2}. Effects were reported to the north as far away as Leningrad, over 1,300 km away, with estimated seismic intensities of IV–V (MCS degrees), to the south, as far as Greece, to the east, up to the Kharkov–Moscow line, with estimated intensities of V–VI (MCS degrees), in the west, as far as Belgrade, Budapest and Warsaw.

== Tectonic setting ==
Vrancea lies within the Carpathian Mountains, which were formed as part of the Alpine Orogeny. The convergence across this zone stopped about 20 million years ago, but the area remains seismically active. The earthquakes have reverse fault focal mechanisms and define a southwest–northeast trending zone about 70 km long by 30 km across. The depth range of the earthquakes extends from 60 km down to about 200 km. Seismic tomography studies show that the area is underlain by a body with a high seismic velocity. There are two models available to explain these observations, a detached subducting slab and delamination of the lower crust. The near vertical geometry of the high-velocity body combined with the focal mechanisms are consistent with extension along the body. Combined with the lack of a clear planar zone of seismicity that would be expected for a subducting slab, this is consistent with some form of delamination.

== Background ==
1940 was characterized by a very high seismic activity in Vrancea County. In the first months of 1940 there were earthquakes of magnitude 4.5–5 that occurred at depths of 130–160 km. On 24 June, there was an earthquake of magnitude 5.5 at a depth of 115 km, scarcely felt in Wallachia and Moldavia. There followed a period of relative calmness until 3 October, when an earthquake of magnitude 4.7–5.0 occurred at a depth of 150 km.

On the evening of 21 October, there were many earthquakes, of which the most important took place around midnight at a depth of 100 km (M=4.5). On the morning of 22 October, at 08:37, a stronger earthquake occurred in Vrancea, of magnitude 6.5 and maximum intensity of VII on the Mercalli intensity scale, at a depth of 122–125 km; this quake was strongly felt, especially in Wallachia and Moldavia. Only light damage, for example, cracks in walls and broken windows, was reported, but no casualties. This earthquake did not have immediate aftershocks.

At the beginning of November there were, however, several earthquakes over 4.0 at about 140–150 km depth. On 8 November, at about 14:00, less than two days before the catastrophic earthquake, there was another earthquake of magnitude 5.5 at a depth of 145 km, which was also felt in Bucharest. A day later, in the afternoon of 9 November there were several weak and local earthquakes, around the town of Panciu, movements which passed almost unnoticed by the population (II–III degrees on the Mercalli intensity scale).

== Damage ==
External videos
- Cutremurul din 10 noiembrie 1940 on YouTube
- Землетрясение в Кишинёве, 1940 г. on YouTube
- Rumanian Earthquake on British Pathé

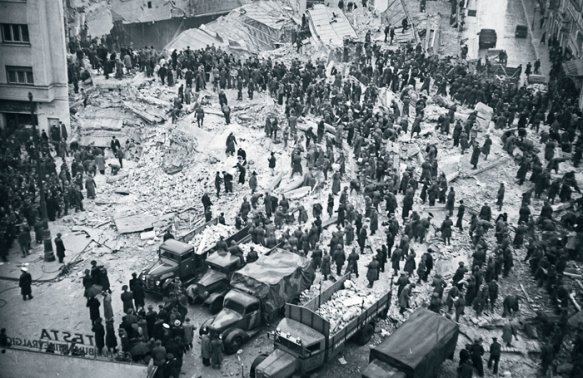
Rescue operations for survivors in Carlton Bloc

The earthquake was felt in Bucharest, where 267 people were killed in the collapse of Carlton Bloc, a 14-story reinforced concrete structure, the tallest building in the city at the time. After the earthquake, the basement was engulfed in flames which hampered the intervention of rescue teams. Almost all ceilings of the concert halls collapsed. The American Embassy, the Post's hotel, the building of the Ministry of Agriculture and that of the General Staff were reported destroyed. According to the documents of the National Firefighters Museum, 185 buildings completely collapsed in Bucharest, and another 412 were seriously damaged. The Romanian General Association of Engineers undertook a detailed study of earthquake effects on reinforced concrete buildings. The main conclusion was that the guidelines used for constructing reinforced concrete buildings, did not take into account possible seismic movement. Following the study, new rules were developed and applied to all postwar buildings.

Focșani, a city 150 kilometres (93 mi) northeast of Bucharest and the epicentre of the quake, was reported in ruins; 90% of Panciu was destroyed, although most of the buildings were made of wood, and the number of casualties is uncertain (22 to 62 deaths, 54 to 300 injured); Galați, the site of the German submarine base, also suffered severely; and Giurgiu, the principal oil port on the Danube, saw public buildings and factories completely destroyed. In Câmpina, a densely populated oil town, refinery chimneys toppled, houses collapsed, and pipelines burst, dousing the ground with a sticky and inflammable threat. In the heavily guarded Ploiești, a few field fires broke out, but were later reported extinguished. In Chișinău were reported 78 deaths and 2,795 affected buildings, of which 172 destroyed.

The earthquake also caused significant morphological effects in the Earth's crust, especially in the sub-Carpathian regions of Wallachia and Moldavia; these effects manifested by landslides, fissures, settlements, formation of cracks in the surface layers of the crust, water spurting from cracks formed alongside rivers. According to recorded testimonies, luminous phenomena were observed, both in the epicentral area and in regions that are far away from the epicenter.

=== Controversial death toll ===
Initial dispatches, reported casualties that were based on sketchy evidence, however on the second day official reports gave 267 killed and 476 injured all over the country until the evening of 10 November. After the emergency response phase, Tillotson (1940) gave many details of the effects of the earthquake around the country and said that due to telecommunications still interrupted a conservative estimate would place the casualties at 400 killed and 800 severely injured in Romania, with more than 150 killed in Bucharest where 30 or more were still trapped under the debris of Carlton and more than one thousand badly damaged houses had to be evacuated. Time magazine (1940) said that about 98 bodies were extricated from under Carlton debris, while there were 357 killed and thousands injured in all the country.

In 1982, the published memoirs of the vice-premier of Romania at the time of the event, indicated 593 killed and 1,271 injured in all the country, and in Bucharest 140 killed from the 226 occupants of Carlton block, with another 300 injured in the city. The rest of the country's casualties were mostly in masonry buildings. Near the epicenter, the city of Focșani and the town of Panciu were heavily damaged and many people died. The cities of Galați and Ploiești were seriously affected, as was the region of Muntenia.

In a research conducted by the National Research and Development Institute URBAN-INCERC, the death toll stands at 593, while 1,271 were injured, with a further 78 killed in Moldova.

Spatial distribution of casualties in Romania due to the 1940 Vrancea earthquake
Location	County	Dead	Injured	Remarks
Carlton Bloc	Bucharest	140	86	Assuming 226 occupants
Various locations	Bucharest	Some	300	
Panciu	Putna	44	70–190	Rădulescu (62 dead, 300 injured); Adevărul newspaper (42 dead, 70 injured); Ziarul de Iași (42 dead, 76 injured); Nature (23 dead, 71 serious injuries)
Focșani	Putna	12	115	Nature (70% of buildings destroyed)
Galați	Covurlui	34	40–130	Nature (36 dead, 130 injured)
Various locations	Covurlui	107	Unknown	
Bârlad	Tutova	12	20	
Huși	Fălciu	Few	20	
Vaslui	Vaslui	Few	Few	
Târgul Berești	Covurlui	Few	0	
Tecuci	Tecuci	19	20	
Buzău	Buzău	20	Unknown	
Râmnicu Sărat	Râmnicu Sărat	0	5	
Pătârlagele	Buzău	Few	Unknown	
Iași	Iași	8	5	
Câmpina	Prahova	6	Unknown	
Doftana prison	Prahova	21	78	40 seriously injured
Ploiești	Prahova	7 Unknown		
Mărgineni prison	Prahova	4	Unknown	
Valea Boului	Prahova	4	Unknown	
Boldești	Prahova	3	Unknown	
Apostolache	Prahova	3	Unknown	
Scăieni	Prahova	2	Unknown	
Mălăești	Prahova	2	Unknown	
Various locations	Prahova	14	270	In Bertea, Românești, Bănești, Mislea, Coțofenești, Teișani, Aluniș, etc. (1 death per location); 110 seriously and 160 lightly injured (excl. Doftana prison)
Mizil	Buzău	Few	Few	
Târgoviște	Dâmbovița	Few	Unknown	
Craiova	Dolj	5	Few	
Turnu Măgurele	Teleorman	0	Few	
Tulcea	Tulcea	Few	Few	
Constanța	Constanța	0	Few	
Elsewhere in Romania		94	360	

== See also ==
- 1802 Vrancea earthquake – 7.9 M_{w}, the strongest earthquake to ever hit Romania occurred on 26 October
- 1977 Vrancea earthquake
- 1986 Vrancea earthquake
- List of earthquakes in 1940
- List of earthquakes in Romania
- List of earthquakes in Vrancea County
