= Carlton Bloc =

Carlton Block
- Blocul Carlton
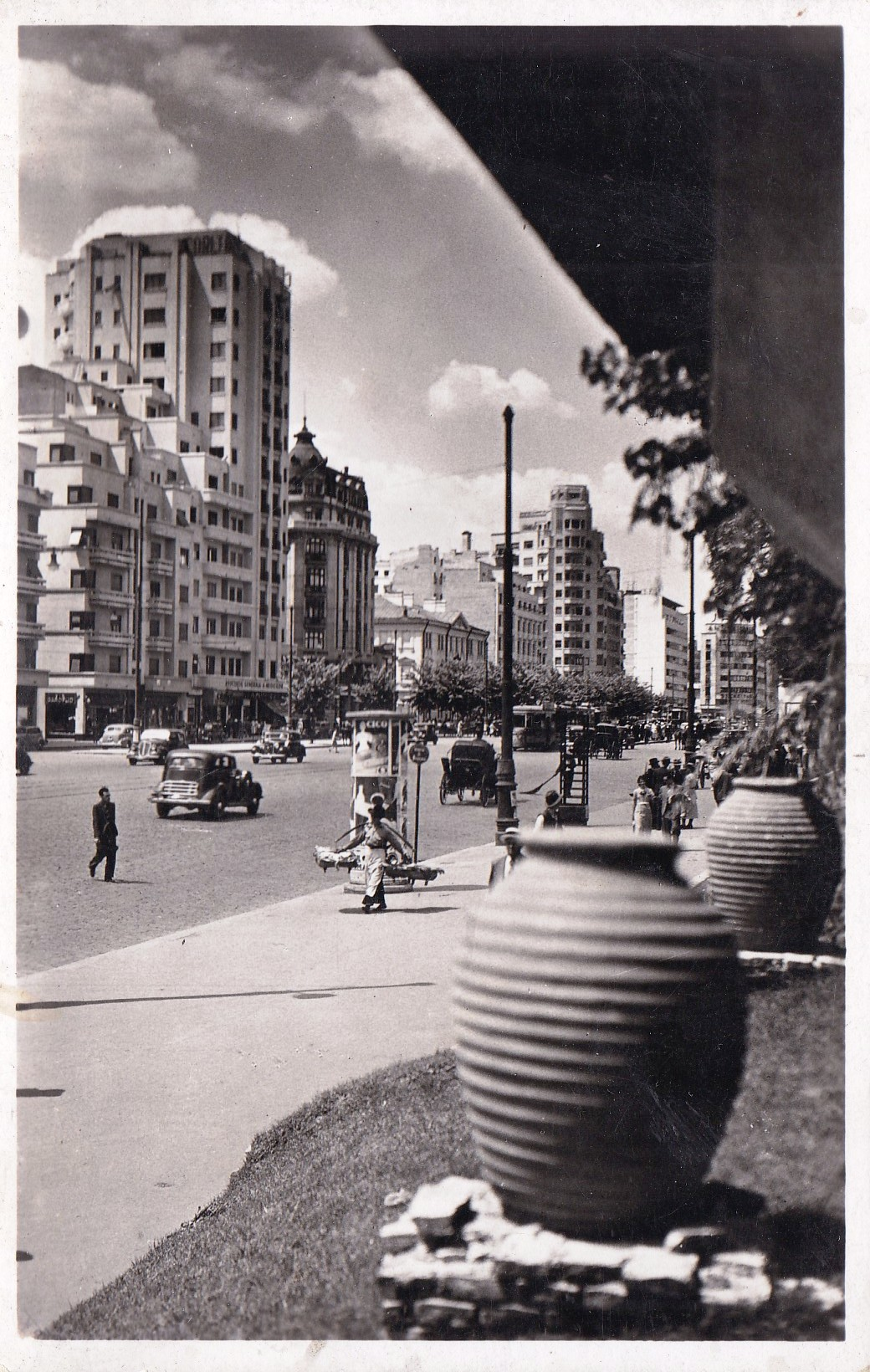
- Carlton Block (left)
- Interactive map of the Carlton Block area

General information
- Status: Collapsed
- Type: Apartment building
- Location: Bucharest, Romania, 9 Nicolae Bălcescu Boulevard
- Coordinates: 44°26′15.0″N 26°06′03.3″E
- Completed: October 1936
- Demolished: November 10, 1940

Height
- Roof: 47 m (154 ft)

Technical details
- Structural system: Reinforced concrete
- Floor count: 14

Design and construction
- Architects: George Matei Cantacuzino; Vasile Arion
- Developer: Karl and Leopold Schindl
- Structural engineer: Franz Schüssler

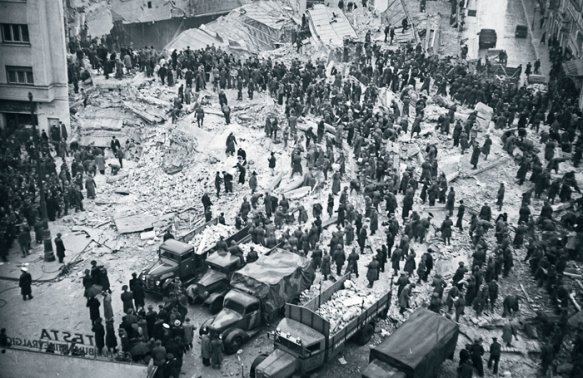
Crews clean up the Bloc's rubble in the earthquake's aftermath. Photograph by Iosif Berman

Carlton Bloc (Romanian: Blocul Carlton) was a residential block located in Bucharest, Romania, at 9 Nicolae Bălcescu Boulevard, completed in October 1936. Having 14 floors and a height of 47 metres (154 ft), it was the tallest building in the capital until it completely collapsed in 1940 in an earthquake.

The building, comprising 96 apartments, was located between University Square and Piața Romană, at the intersection of the Nicolae Bălcescu Boulevard with Royal Street (nowadays, Ion Câmpineanu Street). On the ground level, the bloc had several stores and a large cinema, also called the Carlton.

The Carlton Bloc was designed by architects George Matei Cantacuzino and Vasile Arion. The master plan for the systematization of Bucharest, elaborated by the City Hall in 1935, was the basis for the construction, as were most other tall buildings erected in the center of the capital at that time. The construction was carried out by the brothers Karl and Leopold Schindl enterprise. Calculations for the reinforced concrete structure that conferred the strength of the building were performed by engineer Franz Schüssler.

The Carlton Bloc collapsed during the November 10, 1940 Vrancea earthquake. The earthquake, with a magnitude of 7.4 on the Richter scale happened at 3:39 am (local time), when most residents were at home. According to Constantin Bălăceanu-Stolnici, the collapse of the building killed at least 150–160 people, although other accounts put the death toll at 200–220, with a single survivor (a watchman on the top floor).
