= 2014 Vrancea earthquake =

Earthquake in Romania

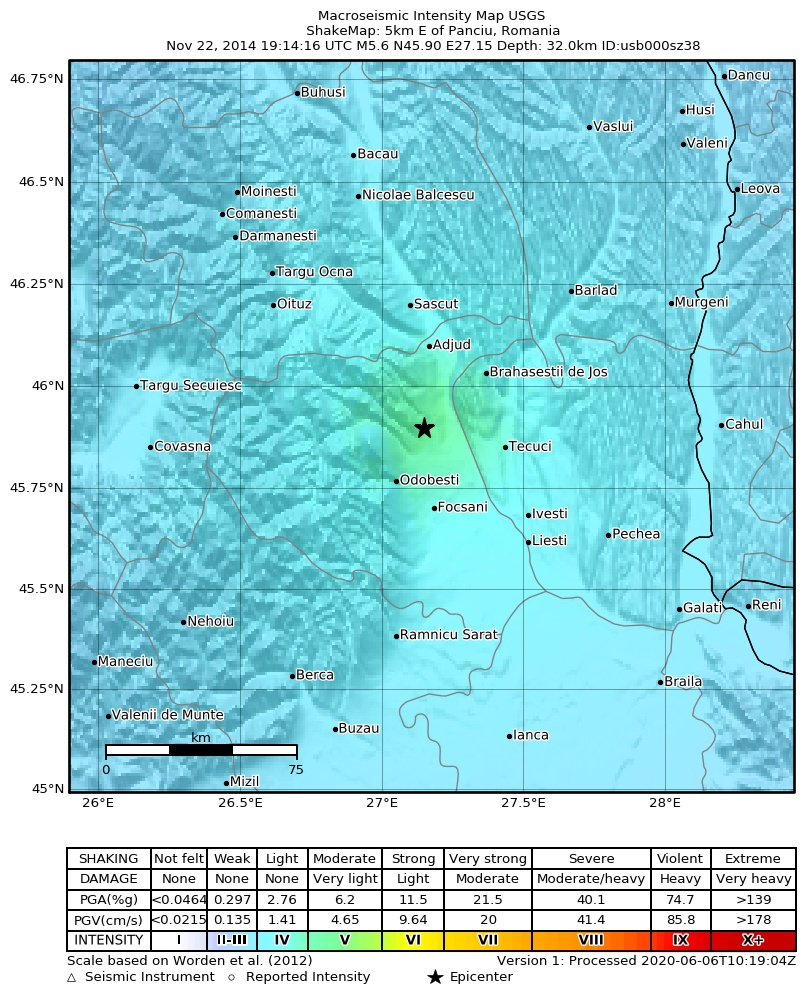

- Location within Romania
- UTC time: 2014-11-22 19:14:17
- ISC event: 611079159
- USGS-ANSS: ComCat
- Local date: 22 November 2014
- Local time: 21:14
- Duration: 30 seconds
- Magnitude: 5.7 M_{w}
- Depth: 39 kilometres (24 mi)
- Epicenter: 45.87°N 27.18°E
- Areas affected: Romania, Moldova, Ukraine, and Bulgaria
- Total damage: damaged roads and buildings
- Max. intensity: MMI VI (Strong)
- Aftershocks: 8 across 2.5 M_{w}
- Casualties: 1 injury in Tulcea; 8 injuries in Galați; 5 hospitalized in Brăila

The 2014 Vrancea earthquake struck Vrancea County on 22 November 2014 at 21:14:17 local time, with a moment magnitude of 5.7. The earthquake occurred at a depth of 39 kilometers and lasted for thirty seconds. On the Mercalli scale the quake registered an intensity of VI (Strong).

The earthquake was felt in northern Bulgaria and the Moldovan city of Chișinău. Towns located near the epicenter include: Mărășești (6 kilometers), Tecuci (22 kilometers), Focșani (21 kilometers), Adjud (25 kilometers) and Onești (51 kilometers). Mircea Radulian, the leader of Institutul Național de Cercetare-Dezvoltare pentru Fizica Pământului, reported that in Galați and Focșani, towns nearer the epicenter, moment magnitude measured over 6.0.

== Damage ==
Shortly after the earthquake, Mobile Telephone network services were disrupted. The frontage of an old building in Tulcea was damaged, and a radiator installed in a sixth-floor apartment fell and injured the owner.

Four communes in Vrancea County lost electrical power. In Focșani, a portion of a roof collapsed, and a road cracked.

Residents of northern Galați County were affected by electrical outages and water shortages.

== Aftershocks ==
A list of aftershocks is included below.

Date	Hour	Depth	Latitude	Longitude	Magnitude
22 November 2014	19:14:17	39 km	45.87N	27.16E	5.7 M_{w}
22 November	20:24:47	34 km	45.86N	27.16E	2.8 M_{w}
22 November	20:30:56	36 km	45.85N	27.19E	3.1 M_{w}
23 November	01:14:39	34 km	45.88N	27.16E	2.5 M_{w}
23 November	02:21:05	34 km	45.85N	27.19E	2.5 M_{w}
23 November	04:01:58	31 km	45.82N	27.18E	2.6 M_{w}
23 November	10:16:14	29 km	45.81N	27.21E	2.7 M_{w}
24 November	15:06:08	109 km	45.46N	26.31E	2.9 M_{w}
25 November	01:52:25	32 km	45.85N	27.16E	3.2 M_{w}
