= 1802 Vrancea earthquake =

Most powerful earthquake in Romanian history

Coordinates: 45.72°N 26.72°E

- Location within Romania Location within Europe
- Local date: 26 October 1802
- Local time: 12:55
- Duration: 150 seconds
- Magnitude: 7.9 M_{w}
- Depth: 150 km (93 mi)
- Areas affected: List: Moldavia; Ottoman Empire; Russian Empire; Austrian Empire
- Total damage: Hundreds of buildings destroyed
- Max. intensity: MMI X (Extreme)
- Landslides: Yes
- Aftershocks: 6
- Casualties: 4 dead

The 1802 Vrancea earthquake occurred in the Vrancea Mountains of today's Romania (then Moldavia) on 26 October [O.S. 14 October] 1802, on St. Paraskeva's Day. With an estimated intensity of 7.9 on the moment magnitude scale, it is the strongest earthquake ever recorded in Romania and one of the strongest in European history. It was felt across an area of more than two million square kilometers in Eastern Europe and the Balkans, from Saint Petersburg to the Aegean Sea.

In Bucharest, the earthquake had an estimated intensity of VIII–IX on the Mercalli scale. It toppled church steeples and caused the Cotroceni Monastery to collapse. Numerous fires broke out, mainly from overturned stoves. In the Ottoman Empire (today's Bulgaria), the cities of Ruse, Varna and Vidin were almost completely destroyed. The force of the earthquake cracked walls as far north as Moscow.

The main quake was followed by a series of aftershocks, of which the largest had a magnitude of 5.5.

== Damage and casualties ==
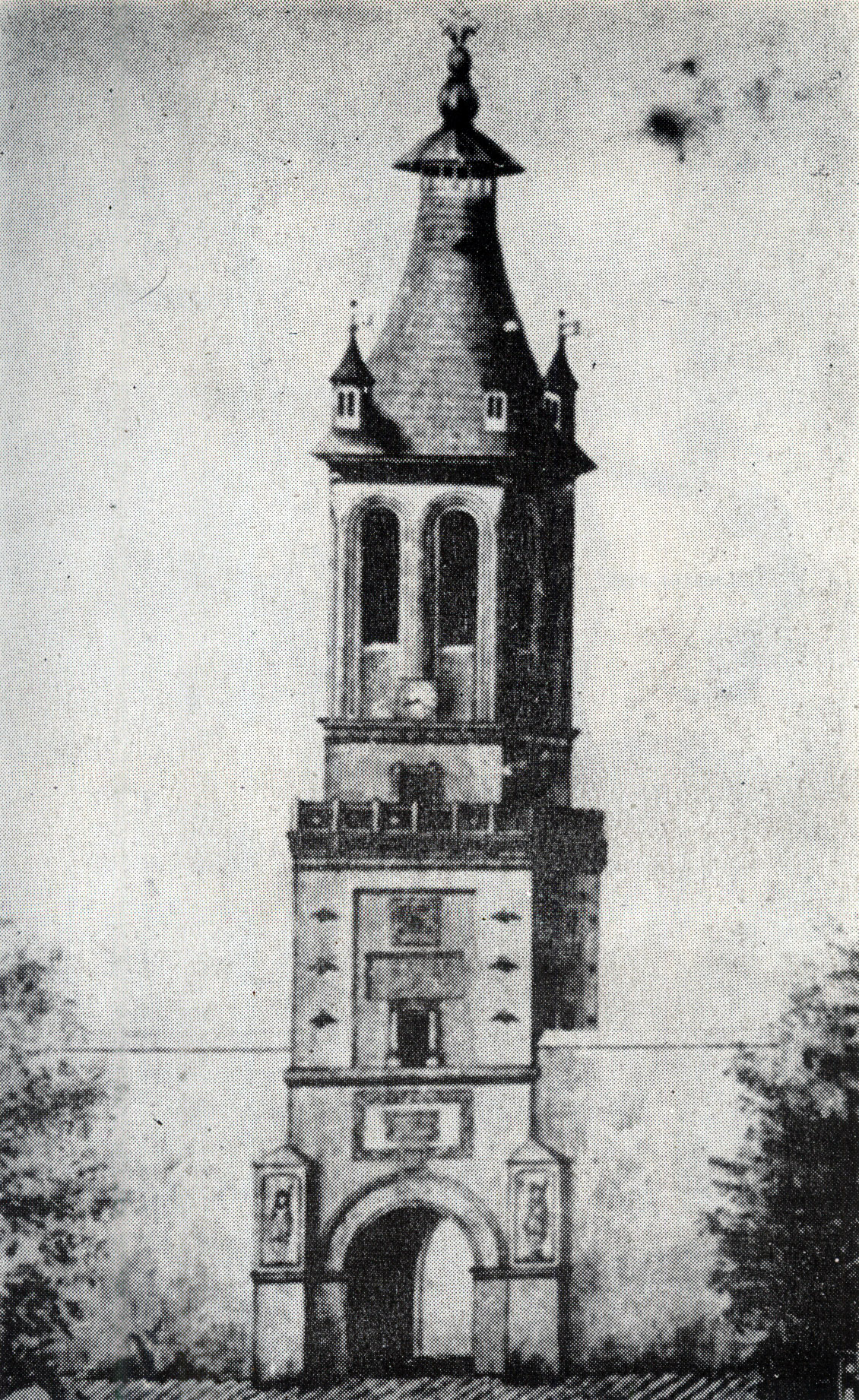
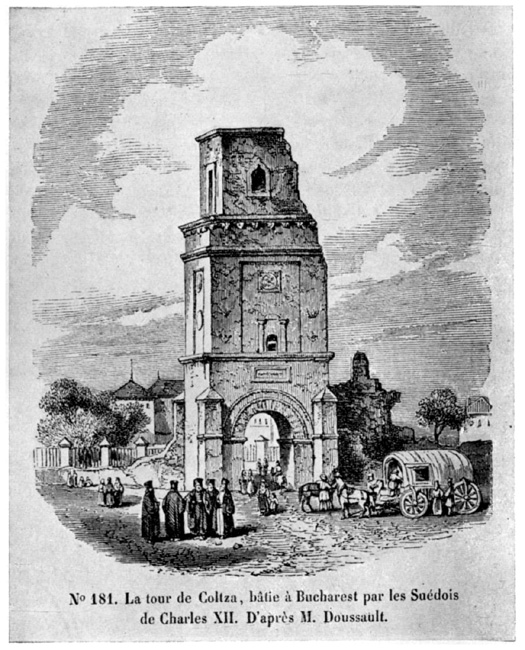
Colțea Tower before and after the 26 October 1802 and 23 January 1838 earthquakes. Drawing by M. Doussault, published in l'Illustration (1842).

The main shock hit Bucharest between noon and 1 p.m. The earthquake was felt for about 10 minutes and was so violent that all chimneys in the city collapsed. Numerous historical monuments were destroyed, including St. Nicholas Church, Cotroceni Monastery and the 54-meter-high Colțea Tower. The Greek chronicler Dionysius Fotino reported that Prince Constantine Ypsilantis moved with his family to the Văcărești Monastery because his palace was severely damaged. However, despite the massive damage to buildings, only four deaths were reported: a Jewish woman and her baby, an itinerant merchant killed when Colțea Tower collapsed, and one other victim. The death toll may have been so low because the houses were built far apart and surrounded by large yards and gardens, so the buildings' vibrations did not propagate. Also, the building materials—mostly shingle and timber—were light.

In Iași, the walls of princely courts fell, and many churches and monastery towers collapsed. In Suceava, the Armenian Church steeple cracked, while in Pașcani, cracks appeared in the walls of St. Archangels Church. Other religious buildings damaged during the earthquake include the Princely Church of the Assumption in Bârlad and Cașin Monastery in Bacău.

Brașov and its surroundings, including the city's Black Church, were severely affected. According to local chronicles, in the village of Bod, more than 50 houses and several churches were damaged or destroyed. In Feldioara, a column of water rose several meters into the air from a crack caused by the earthquake. Buildings collapsed in Sibiu, including the city's Catholic church.

Lord! Lord! Don't waste your people for my sins, but only me!

— Constantine Ypsilantis entering the church of Radovan (on his way to Bucharest)

Constantinople and neighboring provinces also suffered extensive damage. Initially, it was thought that Constantinople, the capital of the Ottoman Empire, had been completely destroyed. A letter from Petrovaradin described particular devastation in the Galata district, Topkapı Palace, the Hagia Sophia and the Edirne bazaar. The main shock and subsequent aftershocks lasted up to 30 minutes.

At 1:30 p.m., violent tremors were felt in what is now Ukraine. The aftershocks, six in total, lasted three minutes and were so strong that masonry buildings in Kiev and Lviv were shaken and the city bells began to ring. The Gentleman's Magazine reported damage in Moscow: "the walls were cracked, the windows were shattered and vaults fell". Anatolie Drumea, an academic from Chișinău, wrote in a letter that a nanny was walking a little boy in a stroller in the courtyard of the Lomonosov University library when, at 1:53 p.m., "the statues began to fall" and the stone benches were overturned. The boy was the future Russian poet Alexander Pushkin.

=== Intensity ===
| Intensity | Location(s) |
|---|---|
| X | (Wallachia) Bucharest |
| IX | (Moldavia) Iași (Moldavia) Chișinău |
| VIII | (Moldavia) Iași (Moldavia) Chișinău |
| VIII | (Wallachia) Craiova (Ottoman Empire) Ruse, Silistra |
| VII | (Austrian Empire) Diemrich, Mühlbach, Schäßburg (Ottoman Empire) Vidin, Varna (Austrian Empire) Chernivtsi (Moldavia) Soroca |
| VI | (Russian Empire) Kiev |
| VI | (Ottoman Empire) Constantinople |
| V | (Ottoman Empire) Constantinople |
| V | (Russian Empire) Moscow |
| IV | (Russian Empire) Moscow |

== Restoration of Bucharest ==
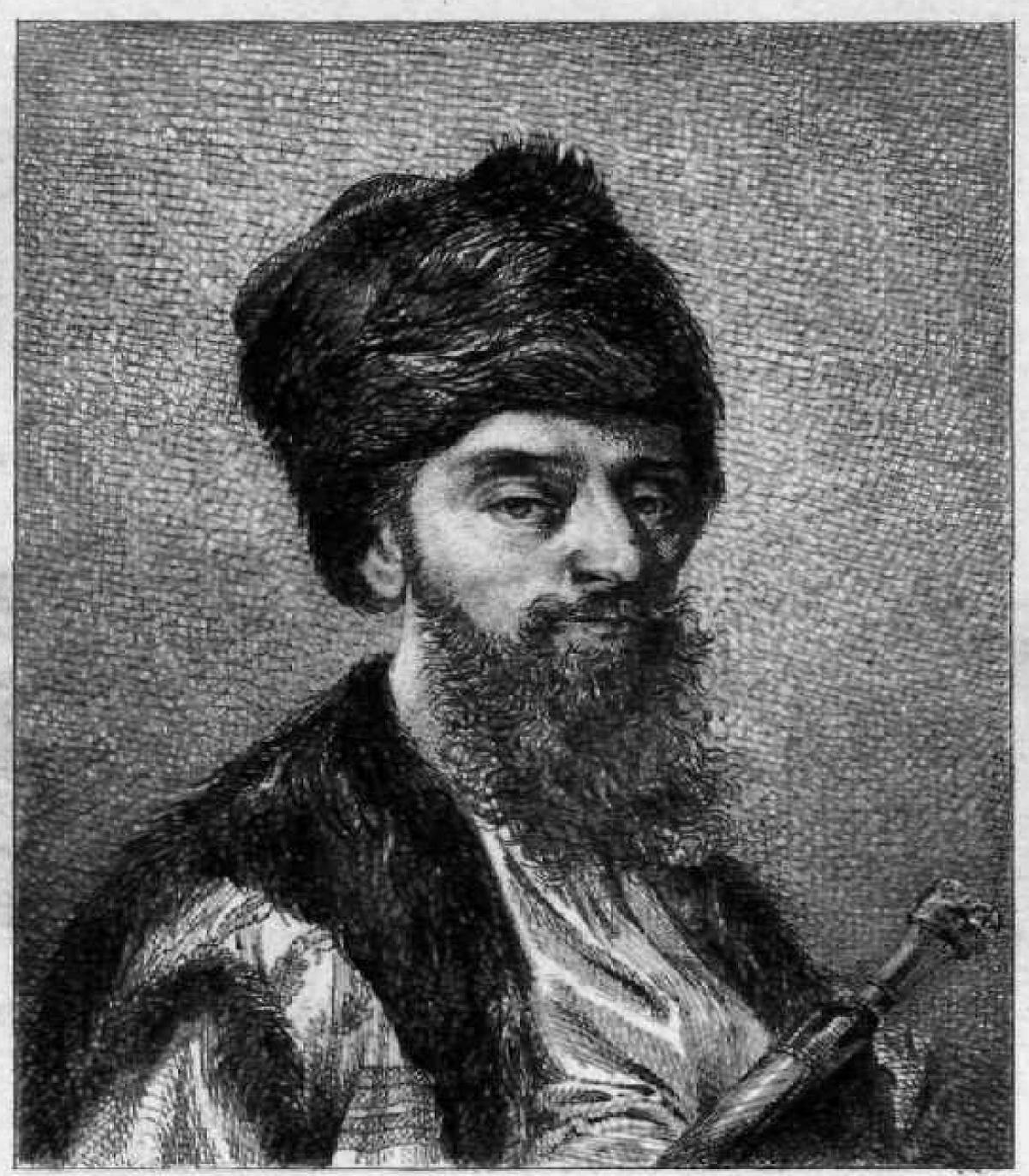
Prince Constantine Ypsilantis, who ordered Bucharest's immediate restoration after the earthquake.

After the earthquake, Constantine Ypsilantis ordered the immediate restoration of Bucharest. To prevent masons and craftsmen from profiting from the disaster, he set maximum wages for their work. Bucharest was rebuilt within a few years, although some buildings and structures were never restored to their pre-earthquake state.

Several earthquakes occurred in subsequent years, but they caused comparatively little damage. One, on 15 June 1803, affected Bucharest's water system and rendered many pumps unusable. Three other major earthquakes occurred in 1804 and 1812.

== See also ==
- 1986 Vrancea earthquake
- 1977 Vrancea earthquake
- 1940 Vrancea earthquake
- List of earthquakes in Vrancea County
