= 1986 Vrancea earthquake =

Earthquake in Romania

- Location within Romania
- UTC time: 1986-08-30 21:28:55
- ISC event: 489699
- USGS-ANSS: ComCat
- Local date: 31 August 1986
- Local time: 00:28:55 (EET)
- Magnitude: 6.5 M_{w}^{(NIEP)} 7.2 M_{w}^{(USGS)}
- Depth: 131 km (81 mi)
- Epicenter: 45°30′N 26°30′E
- Total damage: 55,000 homes damaged
- Max. intensity: MMI VIII (Severe)
- Landslides: Yes
- Foreshocks: 5.3 M_{w} (16 August 1986)
- Aftershocks: 77
- Casualties: 2 deaths, 558 injuries (official); Over 150 deaths (unofficial)

Striking central Romania on August 30 at 21:28 UTC, the 1986 Vrancea earthquake killed more than 150 people, injured over 500, and damaged over 50,000 homes. The second largest earthquake in the area since the modernization of earthquake monitoring devices, it was felt north to Poland and south to Italy and Greece. The death toll makes it the second deadliest earthquake to occur in 1986 worldwide, after major seism of San Salvador that took the lives of almost 1,500 people.

One local news facility listed that the earthquake measured 6.5 on the Richter scale, and the USGS listed its seismic moments as 5.6 and 7.9. A research paper of V. I. Ulomov cited this earthquake with magnitude M_{w} 7.1. Its epicenter was somewhere in the Vrancea Mountains.

The focal mechanism of the earthquake was described as "moderately well controlled", suggesting reverse faulting with some strike-slip motion.

== Geography ==
The epicenter was pinpointed to Vrancea County, specifically to the Vrancea Mountains, about 177 kilometres (110 mi) north of Bucharest. In 1977, another strong quake ruptured oil fields in the area.

== Aftershocks ==
The rupture was located at a depth of between 131 and 148 km, as revealed by the location of aftershock hypocenters. The strongest aftershock occurred in the morning of September 2, 1986, at 05:00 (EET), at 143 km depth, with magnitude 5.0 M_{s}, and was felt in Bucharest with an intensity of about III–IV degrees on the Mercalli intensity scale. In total, 77 aftershocks were recorded with a magnitude over 3.2 on the Richter scale, of which 19 exceeded the value of 4.0 magnitude on the Richter scale.

== Damage and casualties ==
The earthquake was felt in at least eight geographically diverse countries, affecting most of southeast Europe. The worst affected area was in the Focșani–Bârlad region, where intensity VIII (Severe) damage was recorded, causing a church to collapse. In Moldova, the earthquake had, in patches, quite severe effects. In Chișinău, four apartment buildings reportedly collapsed, resulting in at least 100 casualties; the report has never been officially confirmed. In southwestern Moldova, near the Prut floodplain, were observed subsidence of land, sand spouts and the formation of craters near the Prut riverbed. In Bucharest, 50 laborers who worked in the basement of a building died when they were crushed by piles of rubble; this report was also unacknowledged by officials.

Causing 2 deaths, the earthquake also injured 558 people and about 55,000 homes damaged, leaving more than 12,500 people homeless in the Chișinău–Cahul area. Intensity of VII (Very strong) was reported in Bucharest and in northern Bulgaria. In addition, intensities of V (Moderate) were recorded in Skopje (now the capital of North Macedonia), suggesting the earthquake was widespread. This is confirmed by reports of the earthquake as far north as Hungary and east Poland, and as far south as Greece and Italy. Lesser intensities of IV (Light) in Simferopol and Kiev in the Soviet Union and in Belgrade, Yugoslavia, and III (Weak) in Moscow and Titograd, Yugoslavia were recorded.

== See also ==
- List of earthquakes in 1986
- 1940 Vrancea earthquake
- 1977 Vrancea earthquake
