= 1838 Vrancea earthquake =

23 January 1838 earthquake in Romania

- Location within Europe
- Local date: 11 January 1838
- Local time: 20:45 (EET)
- Duration: 3–5 minutes
- Magnitude: 7.3 M_{s} 7.5 M_{w}
- Epicenter: 45°43′N 26°43′E
- Areas affected: Romania
- Max. intensity: MSK-64 IX (Destructive)
- Landslides: Yes
- Casualties: 73 dead, 14 injured

The 1838 Vrancea earthquake struck the western part of Vrancea County on 23 January (O.S. 11 January) with a magnitude of 7.5. The seism caused extensive damage in Moldavia and Wallachia, and killed dozens of people. The earthquake occurred just 36 years after another earthquake of magnitude over 7 on Richter scale devastated the southern part of Wallachia.

The earthquake occurred at 20:45, being felt strongly in Bucharest and also all over the country up to Lviv, Sevastopol, Constantinople (Istanbul), Odessa, etc. A detailed report on the phenomenon was promptly done by Güstav Schuller, mining geologist in the service of the Duke of Saxony. He said the quake had a foreshock followed by three strong shocks.

During this earthquake, in some areas, especially the epicentral zone, mainly in Vrancea, Buzău, Brăila and Dâmbovița counties appeared large ground cracks and liquefaction phenomena.

== Damage ==
The earthquake was felt on very large areas, affecting inclusive the cities of Transylvania and Banat. Timișoara suffered extensive damage, and the Prejmer fortified church was nearly destroyed. Two motions were felt in Sibiu, on the east–west direction, and several buildings suffered damage. Strong shakings were also felt in Nadăș village. The river ice has been broken. Many people were injured. The earthquake was also felt in Cluj, but it was very weak.

But the greatest damage concentrated in Wallachia, where 217 churches collapsed or were severely damaged, most of them in Râmnicu Vâlcea and Craiova. According to an official report, 36 houses were destroyed in Bucharest, among them the Manuc's Inn and St. Sylvester Church. Likewise, four churches collapsed, and other 50 buildings were badly damaged, including the Princely Palace. România newspaper reported that the seism was preceded by "a hissing and a whizzing so great that froze the hearts of fear". Prince Alexandru II Ghica was surprised by the quake inside a theater, together with much of the nobility. Panic took hold immediately on the audience, which began to trample to exit the theater. Several women fainted, being dragged down by the others to be removed from the building that could collapse. That night, Prince Ghica, with officers and army, visited all parts of Bucharest to see with his eyes the disaster. In Brăila was affected the city hospital, patients being evacuated to another hospital.

The quake was strongly felt in Moldavia, where, among other consequences, there was a massive landslide, that closed Ghilcoș Brook, tributary of the Bicaz River, phenomenon following which would be formed the Red Lake. In the Abeille moldave (Romanian: Аlbina românească), a political and literary gazette led by Gheorghe Asachi, it was reported that a violent earthquake was felt Tuesday, 11 January 1838, at 8:25 p.m., in Iași and lasted 35 seconds. Here, several houses and churches (among them Curelari and St. Spiridon) reported cracks in walls, and the theater was evacuated without any incidents.

Gustav Schüller (Gustave Schueler), Counselor for Mining to the Grand Duke of Saxony, expert instructed by the Ministry for Internal Affairs, reported large cracks in the ground and soil liquefaction "both on Wallachian territory and that of Moldova". The report relates that "in the visited areas all massive buildings, made of stone heavily suffered and many of them, mainly churches, cannot be used". On the contrary, "the peasants' houses, as well as all structures made in timber, have been able to deflect since they were flexible, so they suffered less".

=== Damage in Wallachia and Moldavia by county ===
County	Principality	Damage reported
Vâlcea	Wallachia	39 churches destroyed
Romanați	Wallachia	53 churches destroyed
Olt	Wallachia	17 churches destroyed
Mehedinți	Wallachia	4 churches destroyed
Râmnicu Sărat	Wallachia	Severe damage, large cracks in the ground
Putna	Moldavia	Severe damage, large cracks in the ground

=== Effects outside Romania ===
The earthquake was felt on a large area, from Russia to Poland and from Albania to Ukraine. In the following table are presented localities and areas mentioned in historical sources, where the mainshock was felt outside the 1838 borders of Romania.

Locality name		Country	Coordinates		I (MSK)	Damage
Current	1838	Country	Latitude	Longitude	I (MSK)	Damage
Bilhorod-Dnistrovskyi	Akkerman	Russian Empire	46.13	30.30	5	Accompanied by two strokes in underground roar from south to north-west, and lasted two minutes.
Bălți	Beltsy	Russian Empire	47.45	27.55	5	Minor cracks in the buildings, doors cracked.
Berdychiv		Russian Empire	49.89	28.60	F	It was felt.
Budapest	Buda, Pest	Austrian Empire	47.18	19.00	F	It was observed.
Chernivtsi		Austrian Empire	48.18	25.56	5.5	Windows were broken.
Kiliia	Kiliya	Russian Empire	45.42	29.28	5.5	Big earthquake; lasted three minutes and a half, causing cracks in some houses.
Chișinău	Kishinev	Russian Empire	47.03	28.88	7	It was heard a loud bang, followed by an underground hit, then the earth started wobbling, the walls and roofs were vibrating, the doors, windows, and furniture cracked, some things felt.
Yevpatoria	Eupatoria	Russian Empire	45.20	33.36	F	Felt.
Istanbul	Constantinople	Ottoman Empire	41.01	28.98	F	Two shakes were felt severely.
Izmail		Russian Empire	45.35	28.84	7	It lasted three minutes. In all buildings walls were cracked, ovens and chimneys were more or less damaged, and in some houses the walls completely collapsed. Six people received slight injuries from the collapse of their walls and plaster. The Cathedral of the Holy Virgin Protection was severely damaged.
Zhytomyr		Russian Empire	50.25	28.67	F	Felt.
Kharkiv		Russian Empire	50.00	36.23	F	Lasted 30 seconds; felt; tree curl.
Kursk		Russian Empire	51.72	36.18	4	Swinging chandeliers and lamps.
Kaluga		Russian Empire	54.53	36.27	F	Lasted 10 seconds.
Eger		Austrian Empire	47.90	20.37	F	Felt.
Dnipropetrovsk	Yekaterinoslav	Russian Empire	48.46	35.03	F	Felt.
Kiev		Russian Empire	50.45	30.52	F	Felt.
Shkodër	Shkodra/İşkodra	Ottoman Empire	42.07	19.53	F	The shock was perceptible in the region of Lake Skadar.
Leova		Russian Empire	46.48	28.25	7	Earthquake accompanied by a terrible roar; three more blows shook the house foundation, the stoves and chimneys were wrecked, the windows broken, the doors bounced and the walls were cracked. Church bells beat by itself.
Milan		Austrian Empire	45.46	9.19	F	Felt.
Moscow		Russian Empire	55.27	37.22	F	Felt.
Odessa		Russian Empire	46.47	30.73	F	Violent shocks.
Saint Petersburg		Russian Empire	59.34	30.12	F	Felt.
Soroca		Russian Empire	48.17	28.30	5.5	Cracks only in some houses, the furniture moved.
Bender		Russian Empire	46.77	29.48	5.5	Felt vibrating the soil, cracks in houses.
Tryavna	Tryavna/Trevne	Ottoman Empire	42.87	25.50	6	Felt.
Vienna		Austrian Empire	48.12	16.22	F	It was observed.
Veliko Tarnovo	Tarnovo/Tırnova	Ottoman Empire	43.08	25.66	6	It was severe.
Warsaw		Russian Empire	52.08	21.00	F	Felt.
Vidin		Ottoman Empire	44.09	23.08	F	Felt.

== Casualties ==
On 13 January 1838, Manolache Florescu, Bucharest Police Chief, submitted a report, according to that 73 people lost their lives and 14 were injured. Among victims, eight were from Bucharest. But the Consul General of France in Bucharest, Marquis de Châteaugiron, reported over 720 dead and as many wounded. Prof. Dr. Gheorghe Mărmureanu, Director of the National Institute for Earth Physics, stated that in the 1838 earthquake "767 people died". Andreas Ludwig Jeitteles (1799–1878), a Czech medical doctor and writer, quotes in one of his works 12 deaths and 40 wounded in Bucharest.

== See also ==
- List of earthquakes in Romania
- List of earthquakes in Vrancea County
- List of historical earthquakes
