= List of churches in Bucharest =

This is a list of churches, cathedrals and chapels in Bucharest.

== Protestant Churches ==
Church name	Year built	Denomination/Affiliation
Anglican Church	1914	Anglican

== Catholic Churches ==
Church name	Year built	Denomination/Affiliation
Bărăția	1848	Roman-catholic (German and Hungarian language community)
Saint Joseph Cathedral	1883	Roman-catholic
Saint Basil the Great Cathedral	1909	Romanian Greek-catholic
Sacré Cœur (French) Church	1930	Roman-catholic (French language community)
Italian Church	1930	Roman-catholic (Italian language community)

== Orthodox Churches ==
Church name	Year built	Denomination/Affiliation
Romanian Patriarchal Cathedral	1658	Romanian Orthodox
Romanian People's Salvation Cathedral	2018	Romanian Orthodox
Alexe Church	1812	Romanian Orthodox
Apostol din Tabaci Church	1765	Romanian Orthodox
Batiștei Church	1660 1763	Romanian Orthodox
Băneasa Church	1792	Romanian Orthodox
St. Bessarion Church	1797; 1913	Romanian Orthodox
Bucur Church	1600s	Romanian Orthodox
St. Catherine's Church	1852	Romanian Orthodox
Cașin Church	1938	Romanian Orthodox
Cărămidarii de Jos Church	1924	Romanian Orthodox
Cuibul cu barză Church	1760	Romanian Orthodox
Curtea Veche Church	1715	Romanian Orthodox
St. Demetrius–Poștă Church	1843	Romanian Orthodox
Dichiu–Tirchilești Church	1773	Romanian Orthodox
Dobroteasa Church	1892	Romanian Orthodox
Old St. Eleftherios Church	1744	Romanian Orthodox
New St. Eleftherios Church	1971	Romanian Orthodox
St. Elijah–Rahova Church	1838	Romanian Orthodox
Flămânda Church	1782	Romanian Orthodox
Foișor Church	1745	Romanian Orthodox
Old St. George Church	1881	Romanian Orthodox
Greek Church	1901	Romanian Orthodox
Kretzulescu Church	1722	Romanian Orthodox
Livedea Gospod Church	1785	Romanian Orthodox
Malmaison Church	1908	Romanian Orthodox
Manea Brutaru Church	1787	Romanian Orthodox
Manu Cavafu Church	1817	Romanian Orthodox
Mărcuța Church	1587	Romanian Orthodox
Merchants' Church	1726	Romanian Orthodox
Saint Mina Vergu Church	1874	Romanian Orthodox
St. Nicholas–Buzești Church	1854	Romanian Orthodox
St. Nicholas in-a-Day Church	1702	Romanian Orthodox
St. Nicholas–Șelari Church	1868	Romanian Orthodox
Olari Church	1758	Romanian Orthodox
Oțetari Church	1757	Romanian Orthodox
Pitar Moș Church	1795	Romanian Orthodox
Popa Chițu Church	1813	Romanian Orthodox
Răzvan Church	1706	Romanian Orthodox
Russian Church	1909	Romanian Orthodox
Church with the Saints	1728	Romanian Orthodox
Sapienței Church	1710	Romanian Orthodox
Scaune Church	1705	Romanian Orthodox
St. Sophia Floreasca Church	1738	Romanian Orthodox
Saint Spyridon the New Church	1768	Romanian Orthodox
St. Stephen–Călărași Church	1768	Romanian Orthodox
Silver Knife Church	1796 1910	Romanian Orthodox
Slobozia Church	1667	Romanian Orthodox
Stavropoleos Monastery	1724	Romanian Orthodox
St. Sylvester's Church	1907	Romanian Orthodox
Târca–Vitan Church	1820	Romanian Orthodox

== Oriental Orthodox Churches ==
Church name	Year built	Denomination/Affiliation
Armenian Church	1915	Armenian Apostolic
