= St. Sophia Floreasca Church =

Orthodox church in Bucharest, Romania

Coordinates: 44°28′12.6″N 26°06′16.7″E

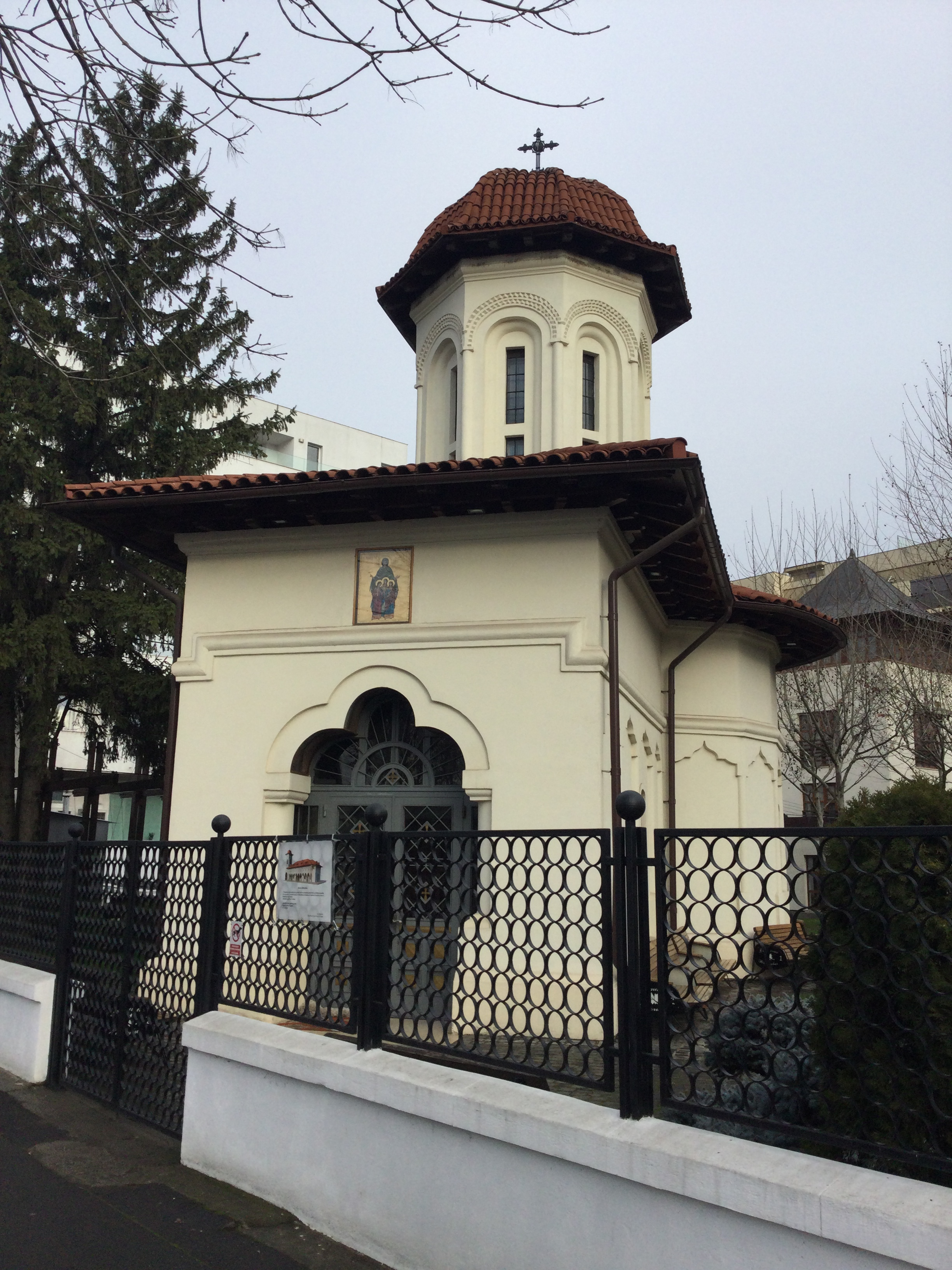
St. Sophia Floreasca Church

The St. Sophia Floreasca Church (Romanian: Biserica Sfânta Sofia Floreasca) is a Romanian Orthodox church located at 216 Calea Floreasca in the Floreasca district of Bucharest, Romania. It is dedicated to Holy Wisdom.

Situated across the street from Lake Floreasca, the church is attested in a document of 1738. However, its precise date of construction is unknown, as the old pisanie, the ktetors’ portraits and founding documents are all lost. It was situated in a rural area, the property of the boyar Florescu family. A silver candleholder, kept at the National Museum of Art, is inscribed with the name Istrate Florescu and dated 1708, suggesting he was the first ktetor. The church was possibly built in the late 17th century, under Constantin Brâncoveanu. By 1916, the church was in ruins, and its reconstruction began in 1926. The original frescoes were restored in 1936, with further repairs carried out in 1986–1993.

The small cross-shaped church has a nave topped by a solid, square-based dome, one of few to survive a series of earthquakes in early 19th-century Bucharest. The nave and narthex are separated by a large, three-lobed, florally decorated arch resting on two columns. A tiny rectangular portico also features a three-lobed arch and precedes the entrance. The partly restored original painting is preserved in the interior. The upper and lower facades are separated by a string course of rounded brick. The much larger lower part is decorated with arches and simple columns. An icon of the patron saint is painted above the portico, and a bell tower is located in a corner of the lot.

The church is listed as a historic monument by Romania's Ministry of Culture and Religious Affairs.
