= Pitar Moș Church =

Romanian Orthodox church in Bucharest, Romania

Coordinates: 44.4430°N 26.1013°E

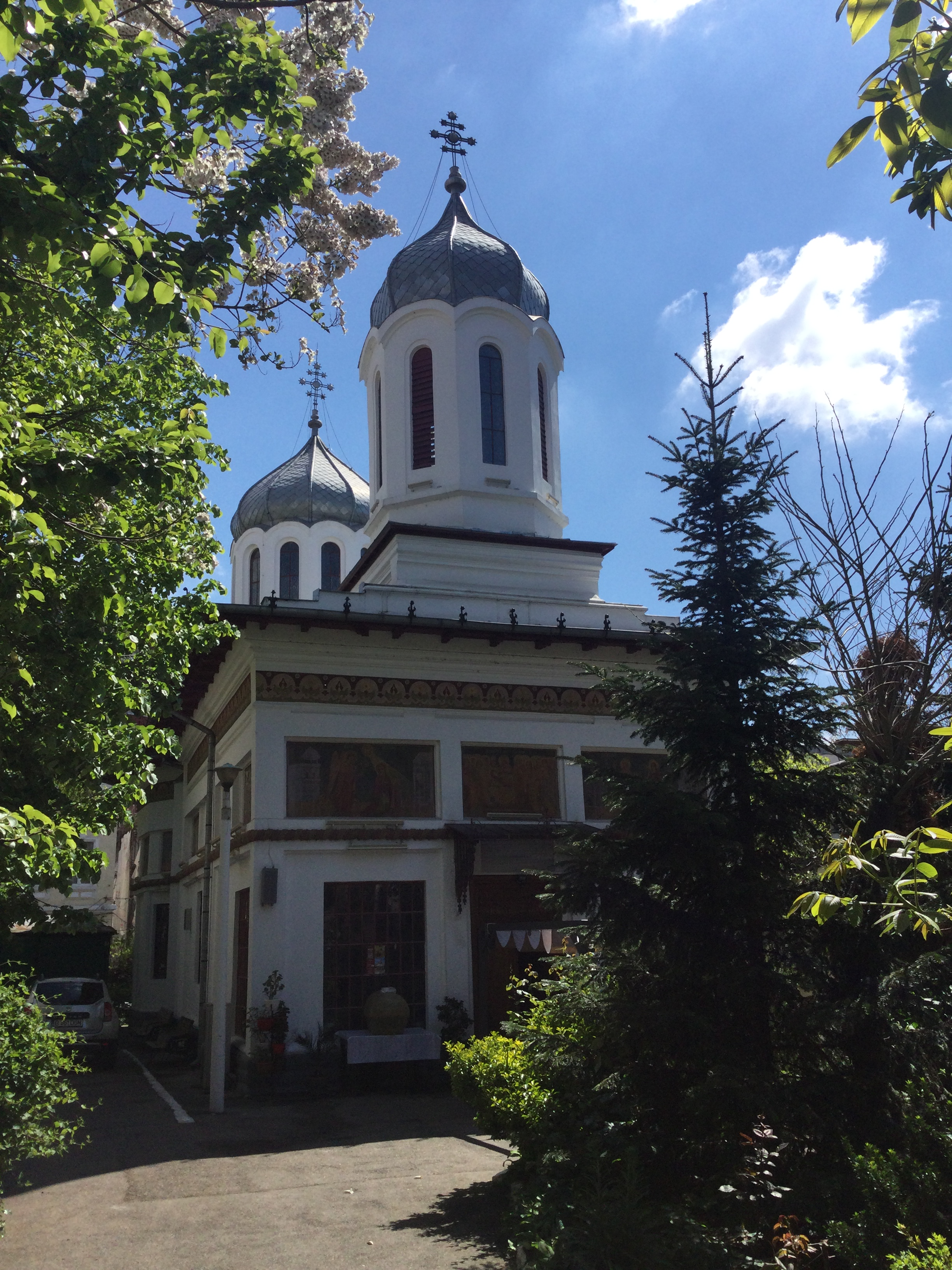
Pitar Moș Church

The Pitar Moș(u) Church (Romanian: Biserica Pitar Moș) is a Romanian Orthodox church located at 16 Pitar Moș Street and at 45 Dionisie Lupu Street in Bucharest, Romania. It is dedicated to the Dormition of the Theotokos.

The church is located on the site of an earlier wooden church, called Popa Ivașcu’s. The present structure was built of masonry in 1795 by Prince Alexander Mourouzis; it was decorated with frescoes on bare mortar. It was mentioned by ban Mihai Cantacuzino on an 1828 plan, and in registers of 1810 and 1831. Its current name, first appearing in 1818, is believed to have initially referred to the surrounding district, where an old man (moș), a Bulgarian gardener named Pedar, cultivated vegetables; he lived over a century and died before 1805. According to the old pisanie, repairs took place in 1898. Consolidation, financed by parishioners, was undertaken after the 1940 earthquake. More repairs happened in 1964, and it was re-sanctified by Patriarch Justinian Marina in 1966, when the painting was redone. In 2003, the facade was repaired and painted in white, and a new, carved entrance door was installed.

The cross-shaped church measures 24 meters long by 9.5-10.7 meters wide, with slightly deep side apses, polygonal on the exterior. The two square-based domes are nearly equal in size and have bulb-shaped roofs. The slightly projected cornice runs along the arches of the side facades of both the octagonal bell tower and the twelve-sided Pantocrator dome. The enclosed portico with ornamental stained-glass windows, has a wide middle arch. The narthex is covered by a rounded ceiling between two wide arches. The first part of the nave is covered in a barrel vault, while the Pantocrator dome rises above the center. The stained glass is decorated with crosses. A slender belt course decorated with vines divides the facade into two sections. The upper part has painted panels on recessed rectangles of varying sizes. The cornice and the narrow frieze, formerly painted with floral motifs, run beneath the wide eaves of the tin roof. The well-planted churchyard connects the entrance on Pitar Moș Street with Dionisie Lupu Street, near the altar.

The church was listed as a historic monument by Romania's Ministry of Culture and Religious Affairs in 2023. Also listed were the parish house, stone cross and grounds.
