= Cărămidarii de Jos Church =

Heritage site in Bucharest, Romania

Coordinates: 44°24′44″N 26°06′48″E

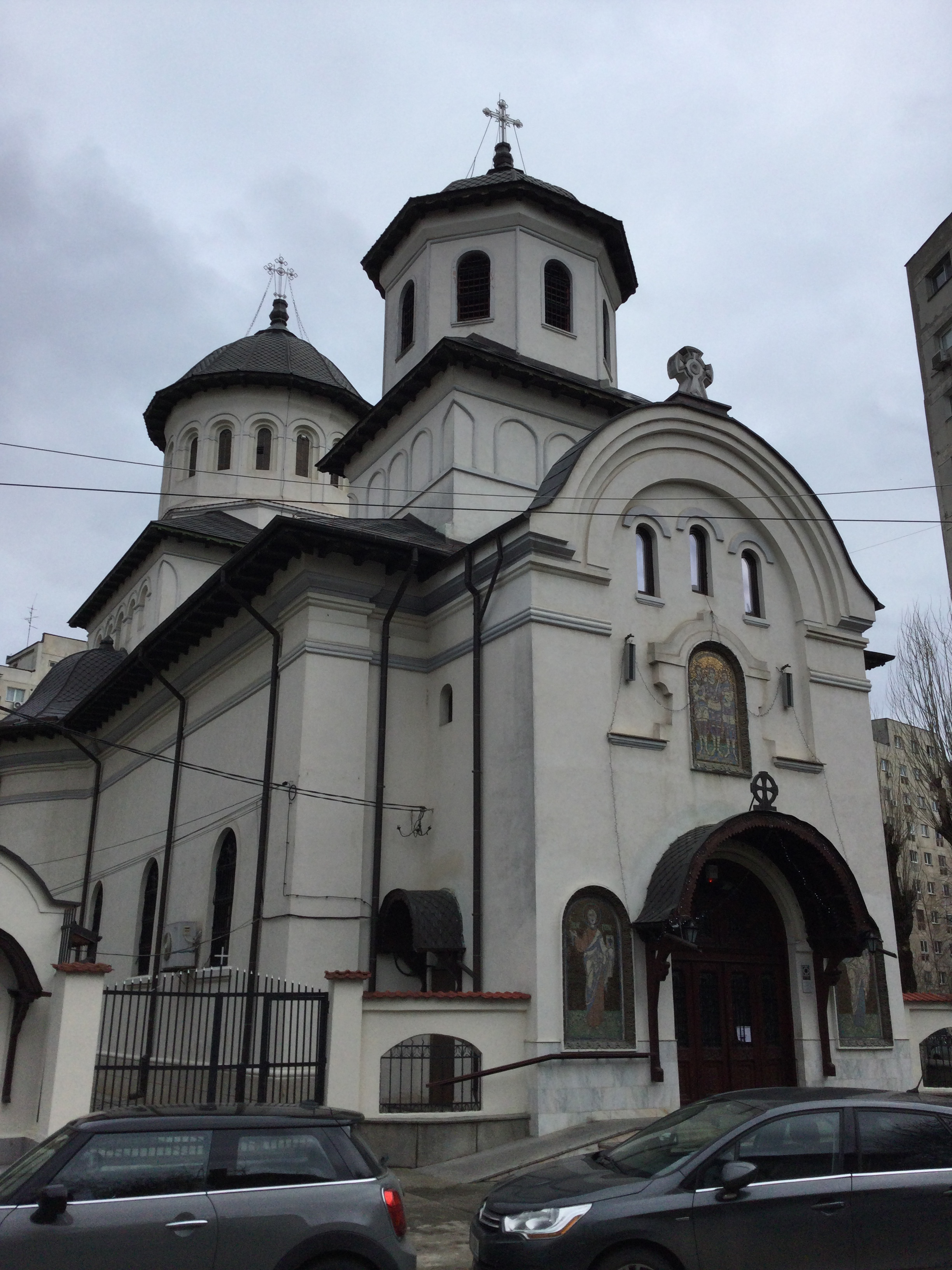
Cărămidarii de Jos Church

The Cărămidarii de Jos Church (Romanian: Biserica Cărămidarii de Jos) is a Romanian Orthodox church located at 3 Piscului Street in Bucharest, Romania. It is dedicated to Saints Demetrius, George and Tryphon.

== History ==
The first church that bore this name, dedicated to Saint Demetrius, was built of wood in 1711. It was moved in 1745 by Vistier (treasurer) Constantin Năsturel, who built the Slobozia Church in masonry near the site. The church is mentioned by Ban Mihai Cantacuzino and in the inventories of 1810 and 1831. It was dismantled in 1854 and taken to an unknown location. The name, which translates to “lower bricklayers”, refers to the occupation of the locals in the 17th-19th centuries, using mud from the nearby Dâmbovița River; they were distinguished from the “upper bricklayers”, further upstream around Grozăvești. The foundations of the present church were laid next to the old one in 1854 by the local inhabitants, gardeners and shoe sellers. There was no architectural plan, with one man sticking oak poles into the marshy ground, shaping the foundation. The amateur builders made the walls too thin, adding a wooden roof and two inadequate domes.

Work then stopped for twelve years. In 1866, a priest started a nationwide collection, and the church was completed in 1870. In addition to Demetrius, Saint George was added as a patron. Repairs were carried out in 1905. The vaults and domes were consolidated between 1913 and 1915, using funds from parishes. In 1922, while metal work was being carried out, the domes caught fire due to negligence. This led to a great fire that left only the walls standing. The reconstruction committee was headed by Miron Cristea, Metropolitan of Ungro-Wallachia. Prince Carol, the heir to the throne, appealed to the nation for help. As a result, he is featured among the donor portraits, along with Princess Helen, Prince Michael, Bucharest police chief Eracle Nicoleanu, the parish council head and the priest. Three architects, including Duiliu Marcu, drew up the plans for reconstruction, which took place from 1922 to 1924.

The old walls were preserved; two new domes, of brick and concrete, were built, and a roof of red tile. Dimitrie Belizarie painted the interior in fresco from 1929 to 1930, with saints’ icons and ornamental decorations on arches and columns. The iconostasis and seats are the work of a sculptor. The church was consecrated in 1930 by Cristea, by now Patriarch, and a dedication was added to Saint Tryphon. Repairs were carried out in the 1960s and early ‘70s, including a new sheet roof, and again around 2000.

== Description ==
The cross-shaped church measures 36 meters long by 12-19.5 meters wide. It has a large, polygonal dome above the nave and an octagonal bell tower on the narthex; both sit on high square bases. The large narthex has an ample vaulted ceiling, as high as it is wide. The choir area rests on three arches supported by two columns. The altar and apses, circular on the interior and exterior, have quarter-sphere ceilings. Entry is through a small, narrow vestibule with two rooms and side staircases. The western facade of the vestibule features a curved pediment topped by a concrete cross. Three narrow windows provide light for the interior. The arched entry portal is covered by a curved metal sheet. Above this, an icon of the patron saints is painted in a niche. The side facades are simple, uniform, with a narrow string course in relief on the upper part. The lower part has three windows on each side; these end in a semicircle and lack stained glass. The apse roofs abut the Pantocrator dome base. Both bases are high and decorated with blind arcades. The sheet roof is surrounded by ample gutters.

The richly planted yard has a masonry fence with metal grilles. To the north, a small structure shaped like a chapel, added in 2004, is used for lighting candles. A graveyard functioned in the yard until 1912, when the remains were transferred to the parish cemetery. The priest Gheorghe Păunescu, who led the rebuilding effort in the 1920s, is buried to the south of the altar. Păunescu, interested in the well-being of his parishioners, built a “Cultural Atheneum” next door from 1927 to 1930. This hosted a cooperative bank, a library, a dormitory for poor students, a free clinic for mothers and children (cutting local infant mortality in half), a choral and instrumental society, a study hall and a cafeteria for the poor.

The church is listed as a historic monument by Romania's Ministry of Culture and Religious Affairs, as is the cultural center.
