= St. Nicholas–Buzești Church =

Orthodox church in Bucharest, Romania

Coordinates: 44°26′57″N 26°04′58″E

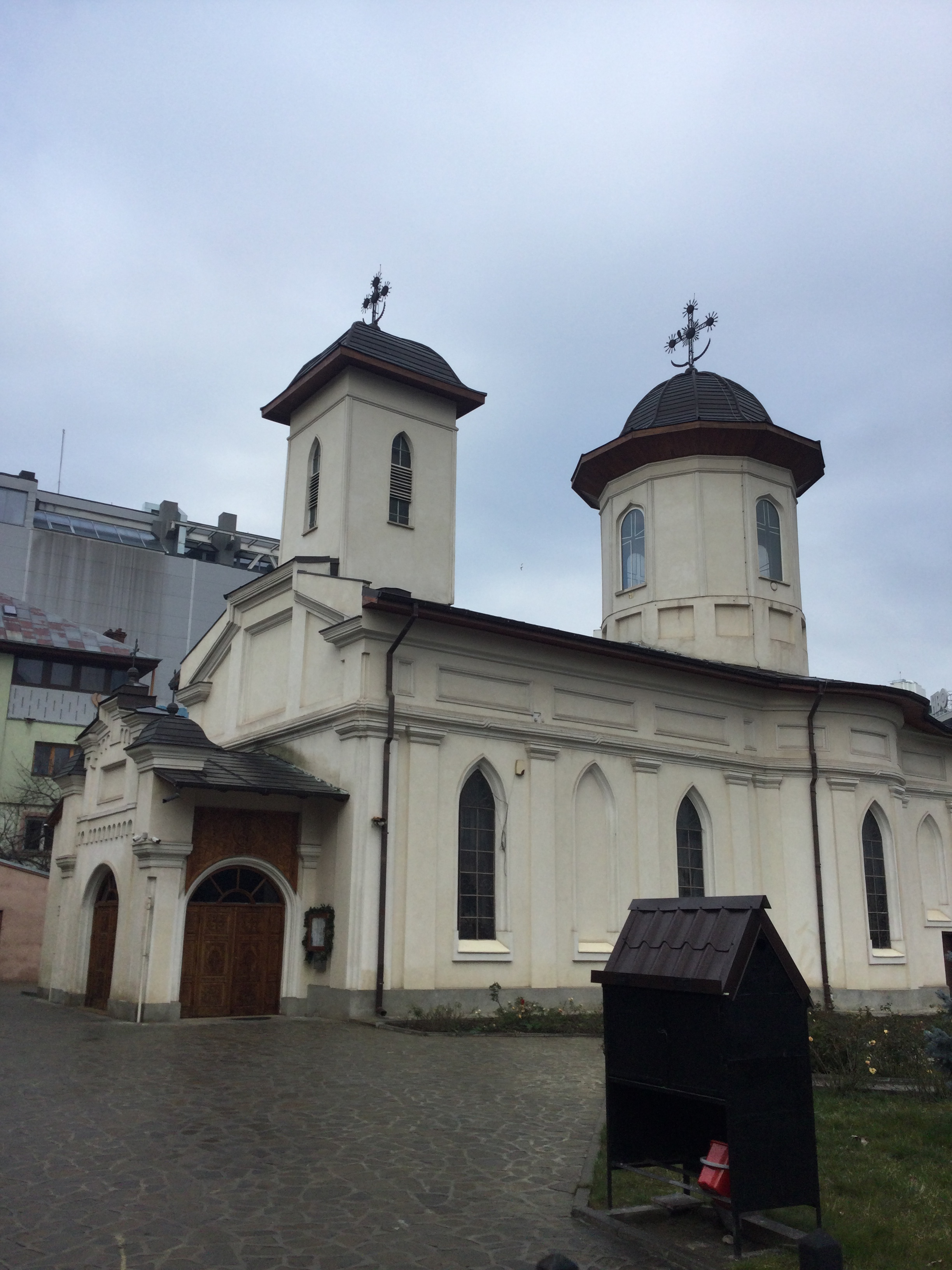
St. Nicholas–Buzești Church

St. Nicholas–Buzești Church (Romanian: Biserica Sfântul Nicolae–Buzești) is a Romanian Orthodox church located at 2–4 Alexandru Ioan Cuza Boulevard, Bucharest, Romania. It is dedicated to Saint Nicholas.

At the time of its founding, the church was located at the northern limit of the city, in an area full of gardens, vineyards and vacant lots, owned by 40–50 members of the carpenters’ guild. As noted in the original pisanie, the church was built between 1847 and 1854, following approval by the local authorities. Among the ktetors was the celebrated Dobre "Dulgherul" (the Carpenter), who also worked as a builder. The portico was added in 1873; according to the new pisanie of 1897, it was later repaired and repainted by Gheorghe Ioanide. The church burned in 1899, and the domes were renovated during the major repairs of 1910–1911. The stained-glass windows of 1911 were redone in 1946. In World War I, the occupying German Army requisitioned the church bells and used the bronze for producing shells; new bells were cast in 1925. In 1924, the facades, choir, mosaic flooring and painting were redone and the portico rebuilt; the structure was re-sanctified the following year.

Following damage during the 1940 earthquake and the 1944 bombardment, the church underwent restoration in 1942–1946, 1960 and 1964. The painting was repaired after the 1977 earthquake, and the exterior panels were executed in 1990. On the night of 7-8 December 1991, all valuables inside were robbed, following which the church was set on fire. The interior painting, furniture, iconostasis and liturgical objects were destroyed, the walls calcined and the domes cracked. Services were temporarily held in the undamaged portico. Repairs took place in 1992–1997, and a new sanctification occurred in 2004.

The cross-shaped Neoclassical church measures 27 meters long by 8.5 to 11 meters wide, with side apses in slight relief, circular on the exterior. It has two domes: a larger octagonal one above the nave, and a square bell tower above the narthex. Both are made of masonry, with flattened roofs. The facades are lined with pilasters, the exterior a simple one, in profile. The high windows end in arches; they alternate with niches featuring icons of saints. The western facade ends in a trapezoid. The portico, smaller than the rest of the church but with a similar trapezoid, features three arches, closed by windows and doors. The church is entered through the south face of the portico, and its yard is planted with trees and flowers.

The church is listed as a historic monument by Romania's Ministry of Culture and Religious Affairs.
