= Apostol din Tabaci Church =

Orthodox church in Bucharest, Romania

Coordinates: 44°25′08″N 26°06′50″E

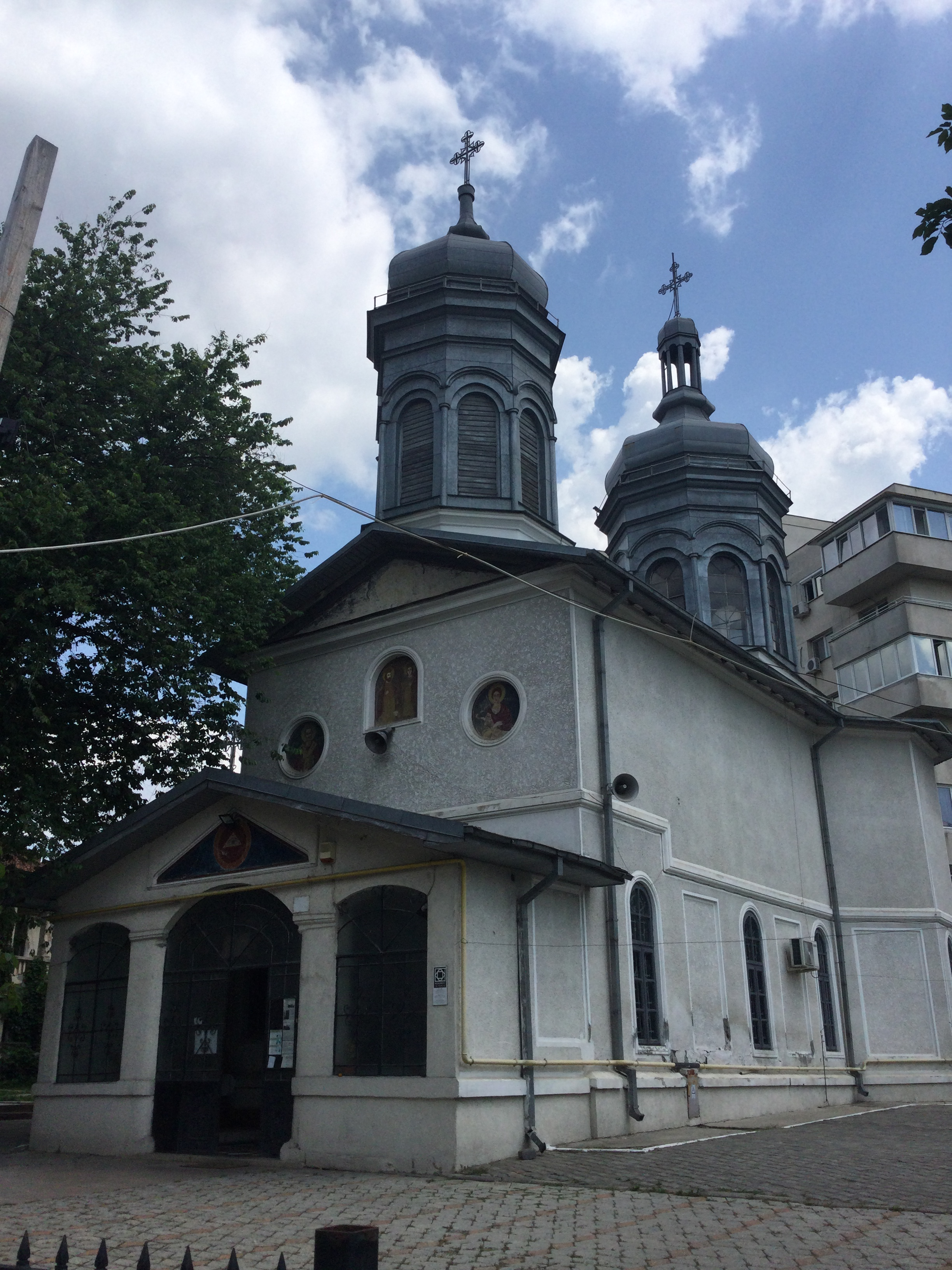
Apostol din Tabaci Church

The Apostol din Tabaci Church (Romanian: Biserica Apostol din Tabaci) is a Romanian Orthodox church located at 143 Mircea Vodă Street, Bucharest, Romania. It is dedicated to Saints Constantine and Helena.

== History ==
Tradition holds that a wooden church, part of a nuns’ skete existed in the area, as seemingly attested by a 1642 document. A princely order of 1672–1673 provided that the leather smiths – tăbăcari or tabaci – of another district be moved there; these workers gave rise to the name of their new quarter, and originally had a single church, later demolished. The earliest sure mention of an older church comes from missionary Blasius Kleiner, who mentions it in a pre-1761 list of Bucharest churches. The present church, situated on a hillock, dates to 1763–1765. As recorded in the pisanie, now lost, the ktetor was a captain at the court of Prince Constantine Mavrocordatos. A 1798 inventory mentions the church as being the parish of the Apostol district, home to millers and bakers. Butchers moved in once a slaughterhouse opened, so that it was sometimes called the “cutting church” (Biserica de la Tăiere) and, from the neighboring tribunal, the “judgment church” (Biserica de la Judecată). Significant repairs took place in 1810 and again in 1820–1830.

The church underwent restoration in 1864, fixing damage from the earthquakes of 1802 and 1838. The flagstone floor dates to that time, while the shingle roof was replaced by lead sheeting in 1894. The columns and arches separating the nave from the narthex were eliminated, enlarging the interior. The masonry dome above the nave was replaced by a lighter wooden one, coated in tin. The more recent bell tower, added along after the small portico, was first made of wood, then in 1910 changed for a metal one. That year also saw the addition of a wooden choir area, changed to reinforced concrete in 1956–1957. Serious damage was caused by the earthquakes of 1940 and especially 1977; repairs were undertaken in 1979, with additional exterior work in 2002-2003. The initial frescoes were redone in oil in 1894 by Gheorghe Tattarescu and another artist. Businessman Dumitru Mociorniță helped finance a restoration of the art in 1924, with further repairs taking place in 1983. The exterior painting, which consisted of saints’ faces in medallions above the windows, was eliminated on three sides during the 1864 enlargement. The icon of Paraskeva of the Balkans is original to the building, while other icons date to 1864; the iconostasis is of wood.

In 1987–1989, near the end of the Nicolae Ceaușescu regime, the church was threatened first with demolition, then with being obscured by building apartment blocks in front of it. Implementation of the proposals was frequently delayed due to petitions addressed to the authorities and the Orthodox hierarchy, as well as through efforts by engineers and builders. The threat of new blocks continued until 1991-1992, after the Romanian Revolution, and construction was only halted due to the strenuous efforts of the parish priest. The foundations of the blocks were covered in 1995-1996.

== Description ==
The cross-shaped church measures 25 meters long by 7.8–10 meters wide; it is around 9 meters high at the cornice and 18 meters at the tip of the domes. The small, enclosed portico is an addition to the west end, the Pantocrator dome sits above the nave and the bell tower above the narthex. The latter is accessed by a staircase starting from a little tower against the north facade. The apses have three sides on the exterior and are semicircular on the interior, with quarter-sphere ceilings. The ceiling acquired its present appearance in 1864: it is vaulted in the space between narthex and nave, then giving way to the main dome. Both domes are octagonal, covered in tin, with bulbous roofs. The larger dome ends in an octagonal roof lantern that supports a metal cross.

The exterior is of painted masonry. The simple string course lies below the midpoint of the facade. Further down are the windows, separated by rectangular panels, while the upper part is simple, the original medallions being swallowed up by masonry during repairs. The western facade features a triangular pediment, once painted and now almost bare. Three icons are painted below: Saint Nicholas on the left, Saint Philothei on the right and the patrons in the center. The church has a spacious yard; the parish house lies on the grounds, to the north.

The church is listed as a historic monument by Romania's Ministry of Culture and Religious Affairs.
