= Flămânda Church =

Orthodox church in Bucharest, Romania

Coordinates: 44°25′18″N 26°05′57″E

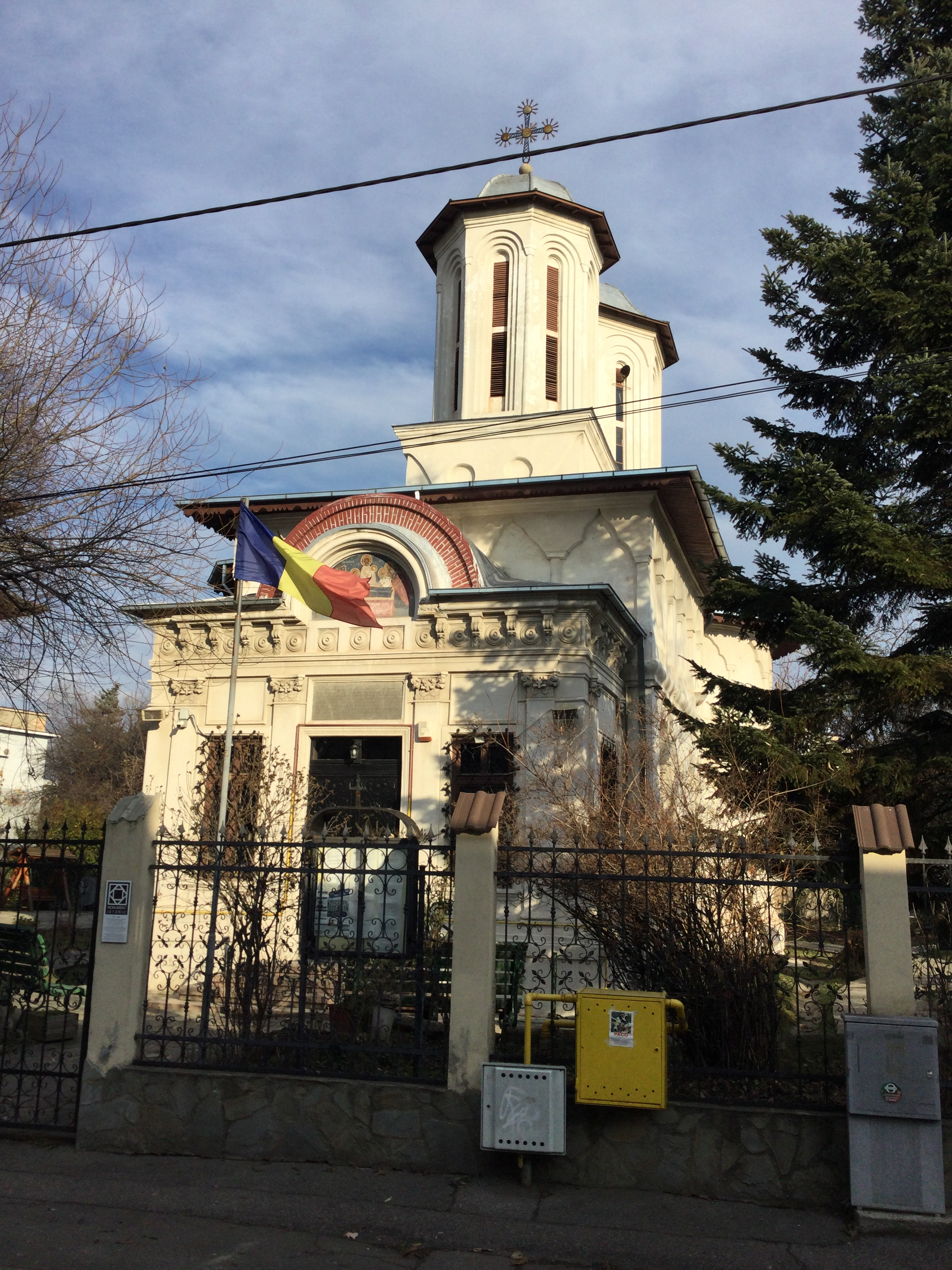
Flămânda Church

The Flămânda Church (Romanian: Biserica Flămânda) is a Romanian Orthodox church located at 17 Olimpului Street in Bucharest, Romania. It is dedicated to the Transfiguration of Jesus.

Tradition holds that the church was built near the Metropolitan Cathedral in order to accommodate the masses of hungry people (flămânzi) who would come for alms on high holidays. Initially, the site hosted a small wooden skete built in 1766, according to the old pisanie. The current masonry church dates to 1782. In 1794, the poor parishioners wrote to Prince Alexander Mourouzis requesting funds for a new roof after the original was destroyed by a storm. The 1800 pisanie states that the church was completed by the tailors’ guild in 1800. The same group carried out repairs and additions during the early 19th century, which saw the addition of an upper room for women. The bell tower was rebuilt after the 1838 earthquake.

Restorations were carried out in 1869–1871, as noted in the new pisanie of 1871. Renovations took place in 1928, 1972-1974 and 1983–1987. Archaeological excavations of the early 1970s uncovered 21 graves around the church, dating to 1766–1782. The interior painting was initially in fresco, realist oil paintings in 1871. Frescoes were painted over the interior in the 1980s, with fragments of the old artwork preserved. The church owns old books, an 1849 reliquary and an inscribed icon from 1825.

The cross-shaped church measures 24 meters long by 8.8 meters wide, with an enlarged narthex. It has two octagonal domes on square bases above the nave and narthex. The old portico is walled in on the sides. A newer, smaller one is closed, with windows, ornamented on the exterior with pilasters and a frieze. A small semicircular arch emphasizes the painted icon of the Transfiguration. The facades are divided into upper and lower halves; the frameless windows are large and rectangular. The spacious churchyard features a parish house from the 1930s and an old stone cross.

The church is listed as a historic monument by Romania's Ministry of Culture and Religious Affairs.
