= Livedea Gospod Church =

Heritage site in Bucharest, Romania

Coordinates: 44°26′11″N 26°05′05″E

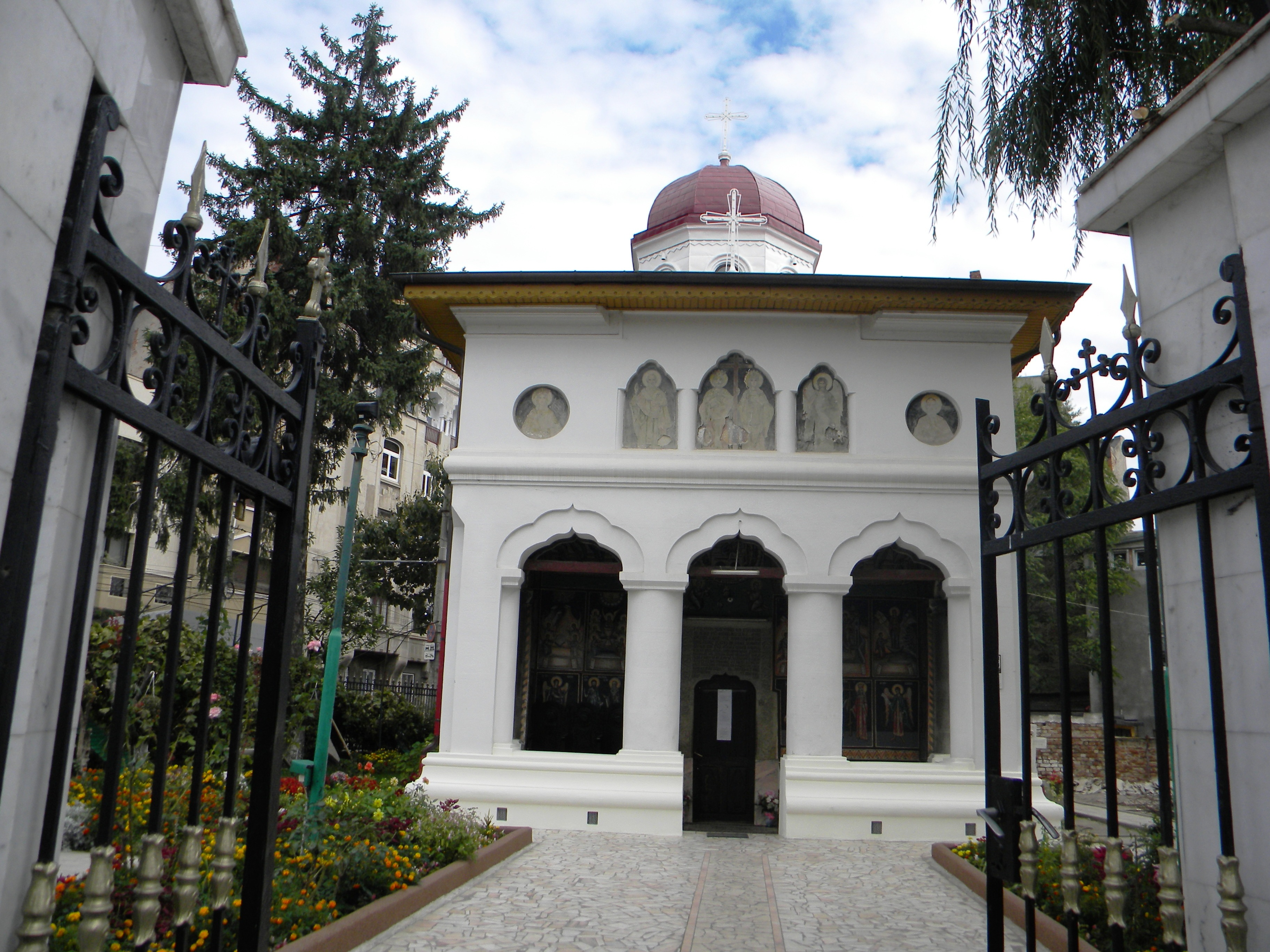
Livedea Gospod Church

The Livedea Gospod Church (Romanian: Biserica Livedea Gospod) is a Romanian Orthodox church located at 30 Calea Plevnei in Bucharest, Romania. It is dedicated to Saints Constantine and Helena.

The church was built in 1785, probably on the site of an earlier one. The name is an archaic term for “princely orchard” and refers to the ruler's fruit trees that used to grow in the area. Its ktitors were several neighborhood tradesmen, including a furrier, a tailor and a saddle-maker. They are commemorated in the inscription above the door, written in Romanian Cyrillic and also noting that Michael Drakos Soutzos was prince of Wallachia at the time. Repairs took place in 1861, 1880 and 1919.

The shape is trefoil; the building is small (19.5 x 7–9 meters), with very thick walls. In 1880, the original frescoes were covered in oil painting by Gheorghe Ioanide. Costin Petrescu repainted after 1918, and further work was done in 1960. The paintings were restored in 1995–1997. The church building was consolidated after 1998.

Original frescoes have been uncovered. These decorate the left apse of the nave, and feature Saints Theodore of Amasea, Theodora and Mercurius. Additionally, the ktitor Constantin Beșleaga appears together with his wife Ștefana and their child.

Initially, a bell tower stood above the entrance. It was taken down after becoming deteriorated, and the bells were taken and melted during the German occupation in World War I. New bells were installed after 1918, in a wooden structure repaired in 2003.

The church is listed as a historic monument by Romania's Ministry of Culture and Religious Affairs.
