= St. Stephen–Călărași Church =

Romanian Orthodox church in Bucharest

Coordinates: 44°26′01″N 26°06′57″E

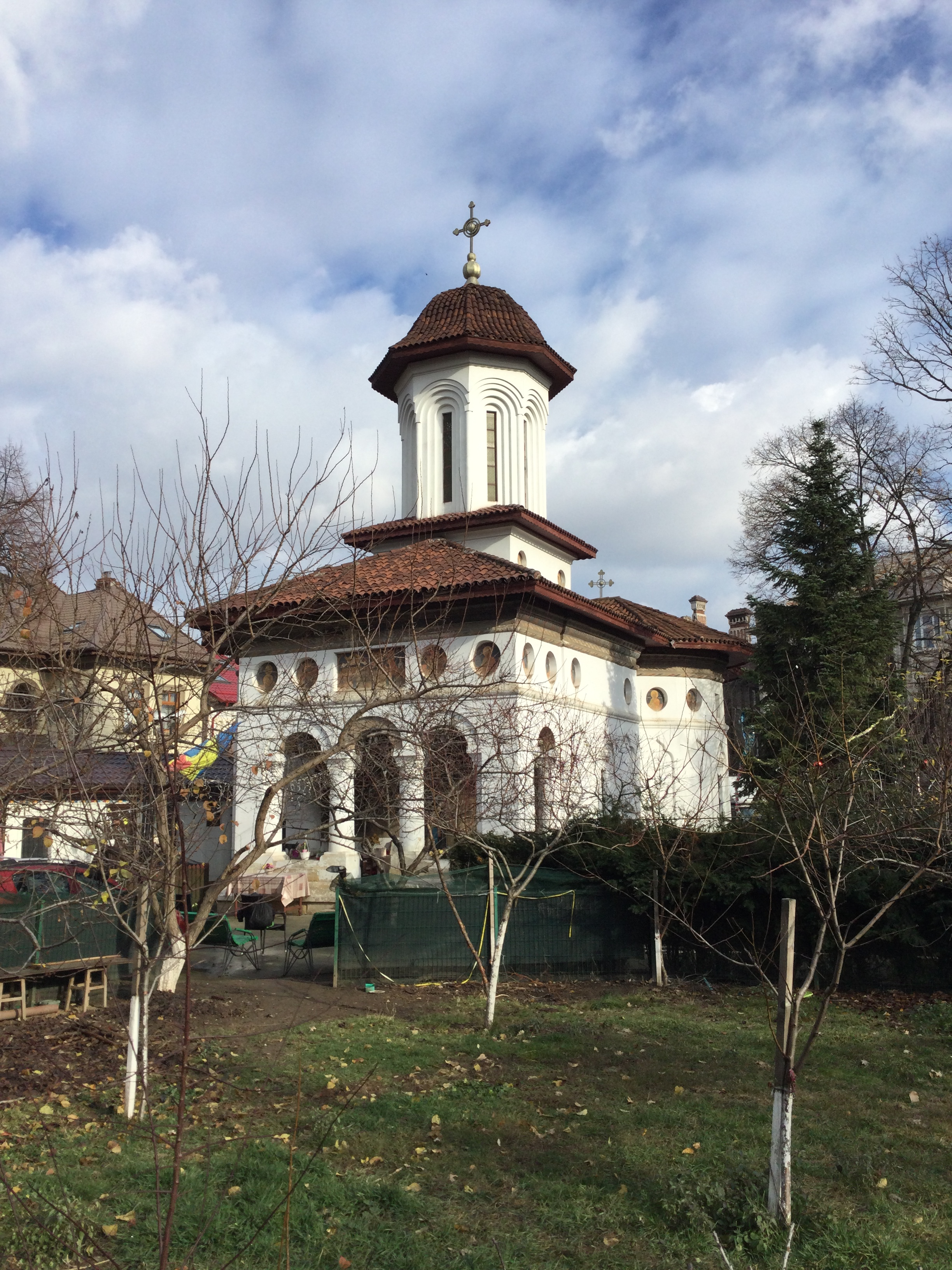
St. Stephen–Călărași Church

St. Stephen–Călărași Church (Romanian: Biserica Sfântul Ștefan–Călărași) is a Romanian Orthodox church located at 83 Calea Călărași in Bucharest, Romania. It is dedicated to Saint Stephen.

The church was built by the clucer Stoica and completed in 1768, as mentioned on the pisanie. It suffered damage in the 1838 earthquake and was repaired the following year. It burned during the 1847 Great Fire of Bucharest and was again fixed. It underwent restoration in 1915–1916, 1942, after the 1977 earthquake, and in 2003. The interior oil painting dates to 1886, and covers the original, which suffered damage in 1847. Fragments of the initial frescoes survive in the portico. The paintings include allusions to two recent events: the military saints George and Demetrius recall the Romanian War of Independence, while the bishop's miters symbolize the autocephaly of the Romanian church.

A small church, it measures 19.7 meters long by 7–11 meters wide, reaching 6.7 meters high at the pediment and 13.5 meters at the dome. It forms part of the post-Brâncovenesc current, with a cross shape like most of its contemporaries. It has an open portico, a narthex surmounted by a bell tower, a nave and an altar. The bell tower is one of few surviving examples with its form: octagonal on the exterior, with slender columns on the edges and five small arches above the elongated windows. The portico has three arches on brick columns.

The facades are divided into two sections by a brick row. The larger lower portion is decorated with recesses, while the upper features medallions painted with icons of saints, as at the Stavropoleos Monastery. The subjects are Saint Stephen, John the Baptist, Saints Peter and Paul, the Virgin Mary as well as Plato, Aristotle and the sibyls Delphica and Persica, depicted as saints with haloes. These were repainted in 1907. The exterior is decorated with flowers and leaves of various hues. The parish house dates to 1936, while a wooden bell tower is from 2002.

The church is listed as a historic monument by Romania's Ministry of Culture and Religious Affairs.
