= Malmaison Church =

Orthodox church in Bucharest, Romania

Coordinates: 44°26′28″N 26°04′23″E

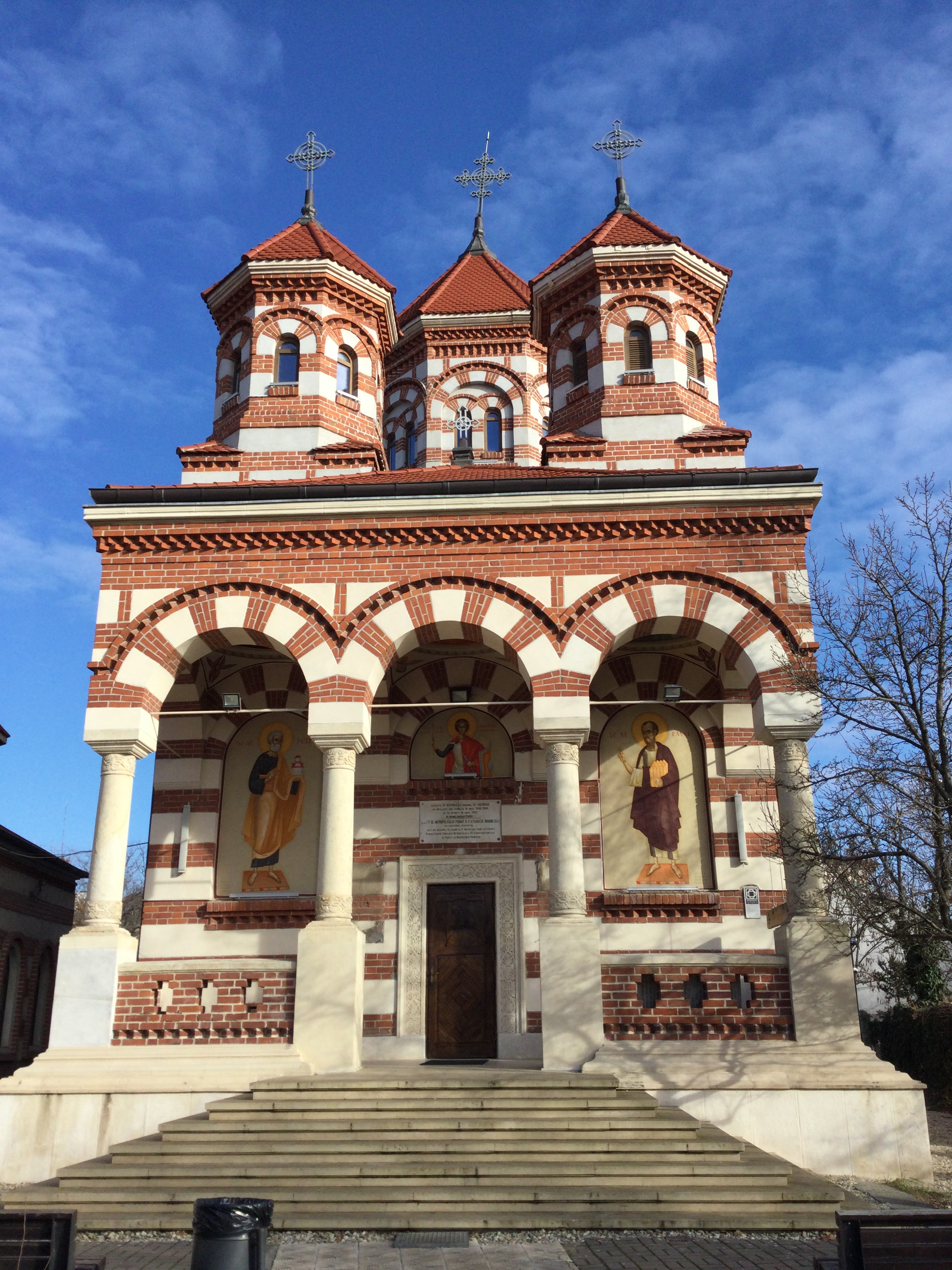
Malmaison Church

The Malmaison Church (Romanian: Biserica Malmaison) is a Romanian Orthodox church located at 122 Calea Plevnei in Bucharest, Romania. It is dedicated to Saint George.

The church, nicknamed after a former military barracks in the area, stands on the site of an earlier wooden church from the 1830s. During the Wallachian Revolution of 1848, the remains of 47 soldiers and two officers were buried in a mass grave in the churchyard; a stone cross was dedicated to their memory in 1998.

The current church was built from the foundations up in 1906–1908, and consecrated in 1909. Monuments to the main donor and her family stand in the yard. The structure was damaged during the 1940 earthquake and repaired in 1943. The old oil painting was redone in fresco from 1954 to 1963. Cracks in the walls appeared after the 1977 earthquake. Repairs followed, as well as a repainting in 1983, and the church was rededicated in 1984. Various improvements were carried out starting in 1992, including to the main dome, riddled with bullets during the Romanian Revolution.

The cross-shaped church measures 22 meters long by 7.5–11 meters wide. It features polygonal apses, a dome above the nave and two small, square-based towers. A large portico reaches to the base of the pediment. It has three arches resting on stone columns. The octagonal domes have conical roofs coated in tiles, like the rest of the roof. The pediment has layers of crenellated brick. The exterior is made up of red brick alternating with pieces of masonry. Icons of Saints Peter and Paul are painted on the portico, with Christ Pantocrator above the entrance. The windows are of stained glass and depict saints. A chapel dates to 2001.

The church is listed as a historic monument by Romania's Ministry of Culture and Religious Affairs.
