= Răzvan Church =

Heritage site in Bucharest, Romania

Coordinates: 44°25′59″N 26°06′23″E

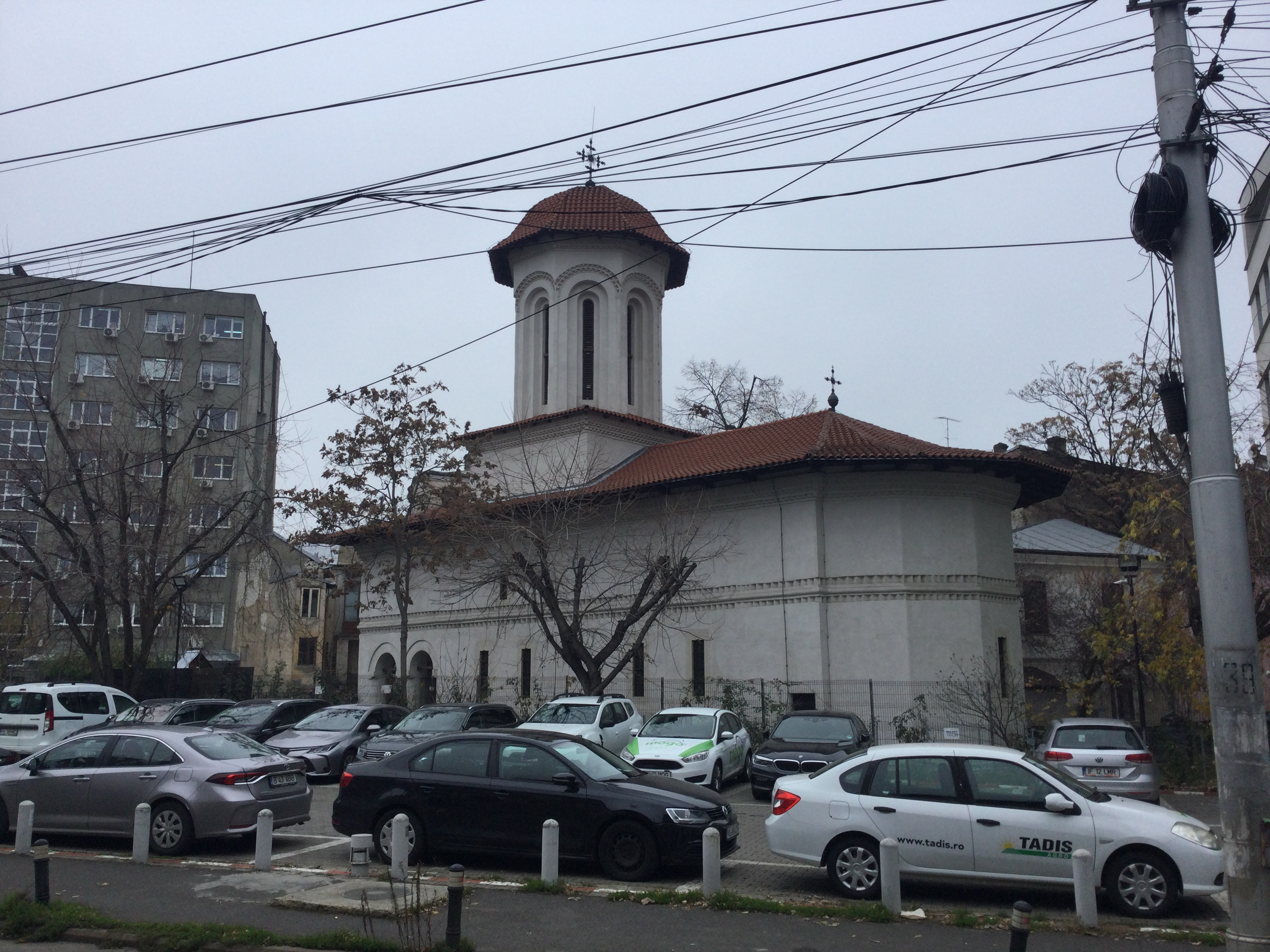
Răzvan Church

The Răzvan Church (Romanian: Biserica Răzvan) is a Romanian Orthodox church located at 3 Biserica Răzvan Street in Bucharest, Romania. It is dedicated to the Dormition of the Mother of God.

The initial church on the site was reportedly founded in 1620 by the Vornic Răzvan. In 1956 and 1969, archaeological excavations unearthed graves from the mid-16th century, suggesting the presence of an even earlier church. According to the 1706 pisanie, it was rebuilt that year and the previous one by Ianache Văcărescu. Prior to 1775, it was placed under the authority of the Church of the Holy Sepulchre. Excavations of 1958 brought to light foundations and cellars from the 17th and 18th centuries, confirming its previous state as a monastery, mentioned in an 1813 document.

After a period of deterioration, the church burned during the Great Fire of Bucharest in 1847. The parishioners repaired it in 1857–1859, at the same time commissioning Constantin Lecca and Mișu Popp to paint the interior. Meanwhile, the old portal inscription was placed upside down in the portico as a paving stone. The 1863 secularization law transformed the monastery into a parish church, while its properties and assets were seized. A 1969 restoration sought to return the church to its original form, replacing the square, wooden bell tower with the current structure, and lowering the entrance considerably beneath the street level.

The nave shaped church measures 24 meters long by 6.5 meters wide, with walls nearly a meter thick and an altar apse that is polygonal on the exterior. It has an open portico followed by a narthex surmounted by the square-based bell tower, reached through a small tower on the north side. The narthex and nave each have a spherical ceiling. The portico facade has three arches resting on thick masonry pillars, as well as two arches on each side. Entry into the narthex is through a finely sculpted stone portal that holds the pisanie inscribed with Romanian Cyrillic characters. The exterior features a string course about two-thirds of the way up, between two rows of sawtooth bricks. The surface is covered in plaster and lime. The tile roof has a large gutter.

The church is listed as a historic monument by Romania's Ministry of Culture and Religious Affairs. Also listed is the parish house, situated to the northwest. Built on two levels with thick walls, it is a fairly well preserved example of a wealthier town dweller's home from around 1856–1860.
