= Saint Mina Vergu Church =

Orthodox church in Bucharest, Romania

Coordinates: 44°25′56″N 26°06′38″E

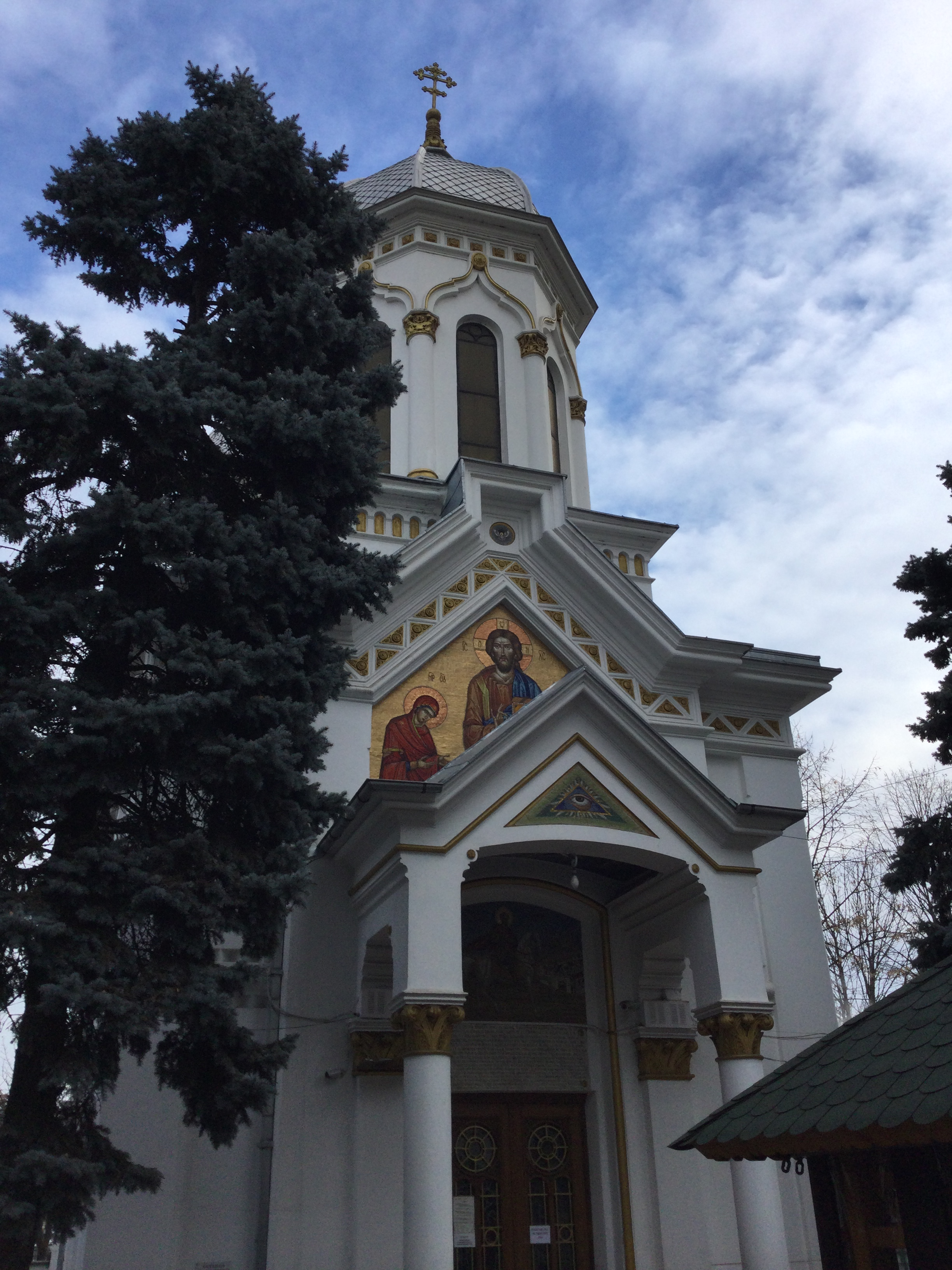
Saint Mina Vergu Church

Saint Mina Vergu Church (Romanian: Biserica Sfântul Mina Vergu) is a Romanian Orthodox church located at 18A C. F. Robescu Street in Bucharest, Romania. It is dedicated to Saint Mina.

The name of the church derives from Vergo, who served as paharnic around 1695. The first church on the site dated to 1724–1725. It was destroyed by the 1838 and 1853 earthquakes, and by the 1847 Great Fire of Bucharest. The rebuilt church was completed in 1874; it houses relics and a wonderworking icon of its eponymous saint. The building was renovated in 1900, when the portico was added, and painted the following year. Following the 1940 earthquake, it was again repaired in 1941–1943, following the plans of Constantin Joja. In 1945, the large dome was consolidated and the frescoes redone. Further repairs and repainting followed the 1977 quake, and the church was rededicated in 1981.The bell tower dates to 2002.

The nave-shaped church has a polygonal altar apse. It measures 23.8 meters long by 8 meters wide. The large dome sits on the nave, while the smaller, which features bells, is on the narthex. The square-based domes have eight faces with arched windows and slender columns on the edges. The portico has a single arch on two columns. The facades are simple, in Neo-Brâncovenesc elements, and divided by two rows of bricks. The large stained-glass windows have ornamental niches. The upper areas are decorated with friezes in geometric patterns.

The church is listed as a historic monument by Romania's Ministry of Culture and Religious Affairs.
