= Popa Chițu Church =

Heritage site in Bucharest, Romania

Coordinates: 44°26′33″N 26°06′41″E

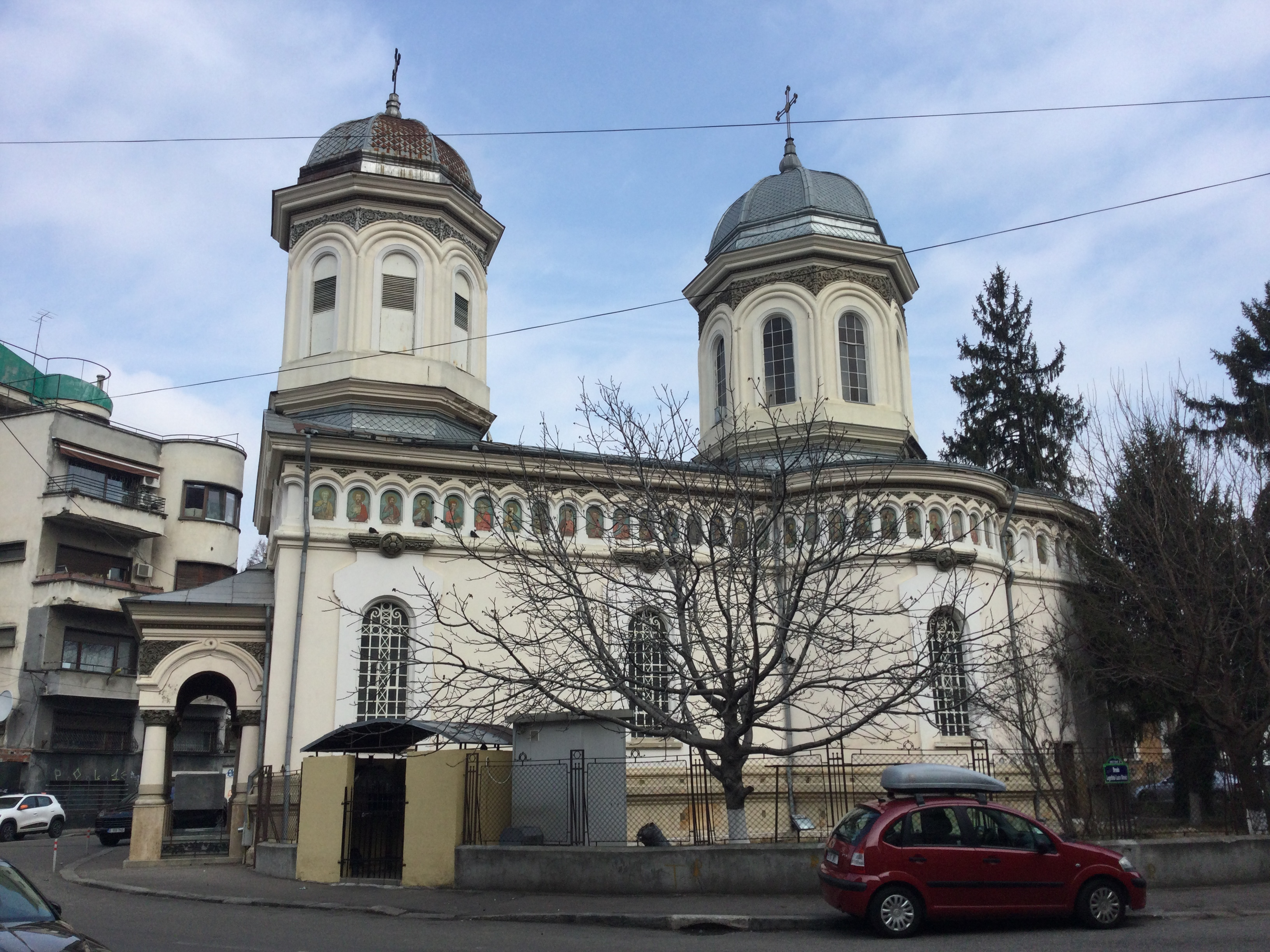
Popa Chițu Church

The Popa Chițu Church (Romanian: Biserica Popa Chițu) is a Romanian Orthodox church located at 33 Logofătul Luca Stroici Street in Bucharest, Romania. It is dedicated to Saint Spyridon.

The first church in the vicinity was attested as of 1789–1791. Surrounded by a graveyard and called Popa Petre after a certain priest, it was severely damaged by the 1802 earthquake, although the ruins were left in place until late in the century. A monument on the site of its altar dates to the 1980s. The current church was built in 1813 by two priests, their wives and the shoemakers' guild. Initially having a single dome and a shingle roof, it was called either after Popa Petre or Popa Chițu, another priest. Dedicated to Saint Spyridon in 1831, it was damaged by the 1838 quake, which cracked the walls but left the ceiling largely intact.

Repairs took place in 1878–1880, when a second dome was added above the narthex, a tin roof was built and the interior was painted. In 1932–1937, while the walls were repaired, Iosif Keber painted frescoes. The mosaic floor, concrete iconostasis with gilt stucco, stained glass and marble panel in the narthex date to that time. The ktetors of this phase are painted on the narthex wall and buried beneath its floor. A thorough restoration of 1975-1980 eliminated mildew, while Keber restored the painting and the exterior was fitted with a row of 91 glass-covered niches painted with saints. The church was re-sanctified in 1980; further upgrades took place in 2001–2003.

Situated on a traffic island, the cross-shaped church measures 23.5 meters long by 7.5-11.3 meters wide. It has circular apses and a Pantocrator dome above the nave. The bell tower sits above the narthex. Both domes are octagonal, as are their bases. The western facade ends in a pediment. An open portico sits in front: it features three arches held up by columns of painted masonry, themselves resting on mosaic-coated pedestals as high as the foundation. There are floral patterns between the portico arches, under the main cornice and on the domes. The large windows are semicircular. The interior painting features scenes from the life of Christ; they are done in warm, pale colors, predominantly ocher.

The church is listed as a historic monument by Romania's Ministry of Culture and Religious Affairs.
