= Alexe Church =

Heritage site in Bucharest, Romania

Coordinates: 44°25′01″N 26°06′04″E

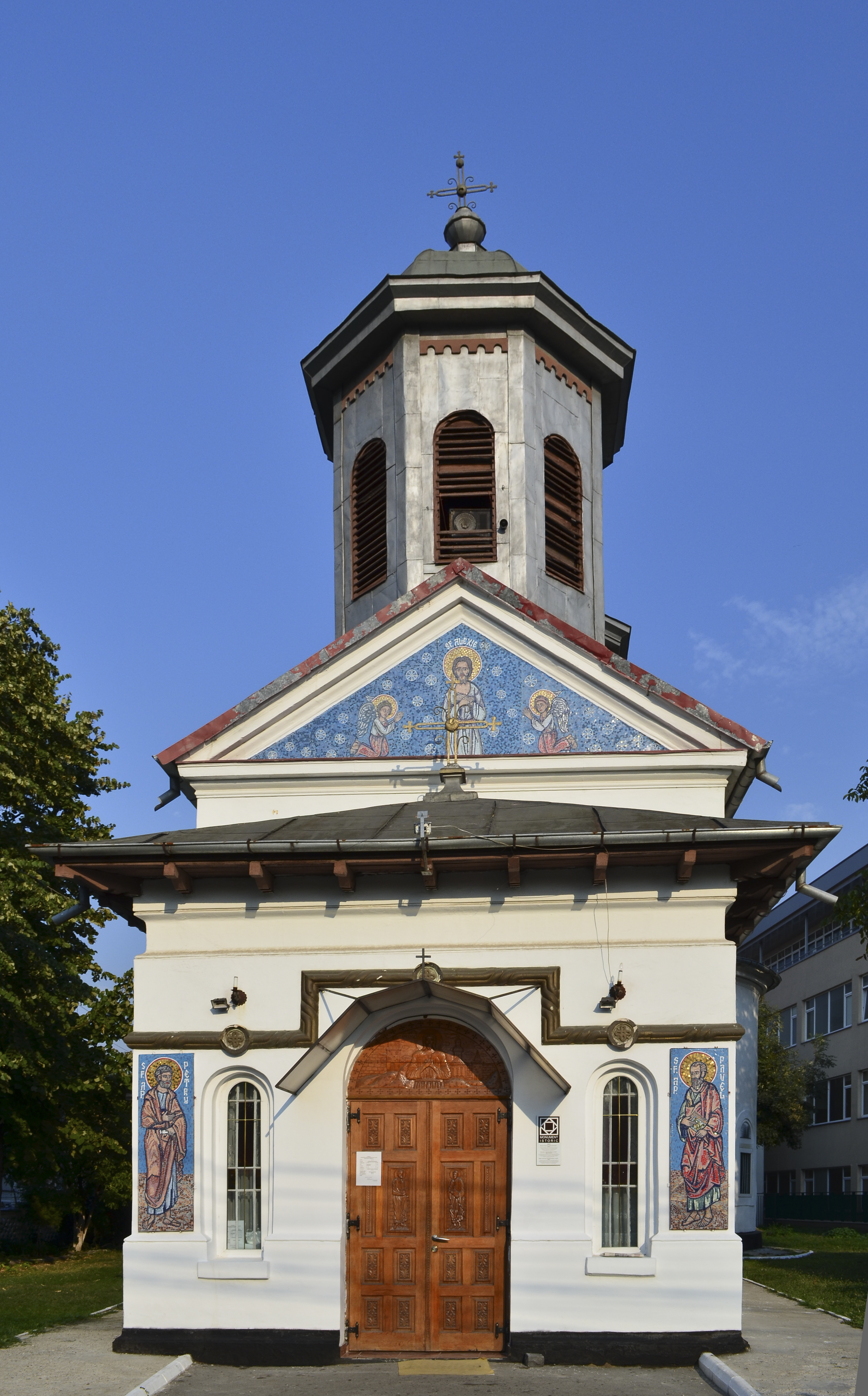
Alexe Church

The Alexe Church (Romanian: Biserica Sfântul Alexie) is a Romanian Orthodox church located at 123 Calea Șerban Vodă in Bucharest, Romania. It is dedicated to the Dormition of the Mother of God.

Reportedly, the church was built of brick around 1799, on the site of an earlier wooden church. A list of names to be prayed for, since lost, was carved in stone in the altar and mentioned the year 1809; another such list was from 1812. At any event, the church was re-founded in 1812 by a certain Alexe Arnăutu and his wife Maria. Upon his death the following year, he dedicated the church to the Hilandar Monastery on Mount Athos. The interior painting, in Renaissance style, is by Gheorghe Ioanid. Renovations took place after the 1838 earthquake, again in 1845 and, as recorded in the pisanie, in 1897. Major repairs were undertaken in 1926, with more minor interventions in 1948, 1953 and 1979. It was mostly closed from 1988 to 1998, with demolition proposed. More repairs started in 2004.

The cross-shaped church measures 28 meters long by 6–12 meters wide. The altar apse is polygonal, the wide side apses round on the exterior. The nave and narthex are beneath the same tin roof; the entrance facade features a simple pediment. The larger dome, above the nave, has windows on all eight sides; the octagonal bell tower is above the narthex. Both are coated in tin and neither has a base. The narthex ceiling is flat, with the choir area above. The added portico is narrower than the narthex and just one story high. It is entered through a large central arch that has a metal door. To the right and left there are two narrow windows rounded above, similar to the side windows. There is a string course on the portico; otherwise, the whitewashed facades are plain. The painting depicting the patron feast sits in a small rectangular frame on the pediment. The large lower windows have stained glass with saints and Biblical scenes. The smaller upper windows light the choir. The surrounding yard is large, with old poplars near the street.

The church is listed as a historic monument by Romania's Ministry of Culture and Religious Affairs.
