= Băneasa Church =

Heritage site in Bucharest, Romania

Coordinates: 44°29′13″N 26°04′39″E

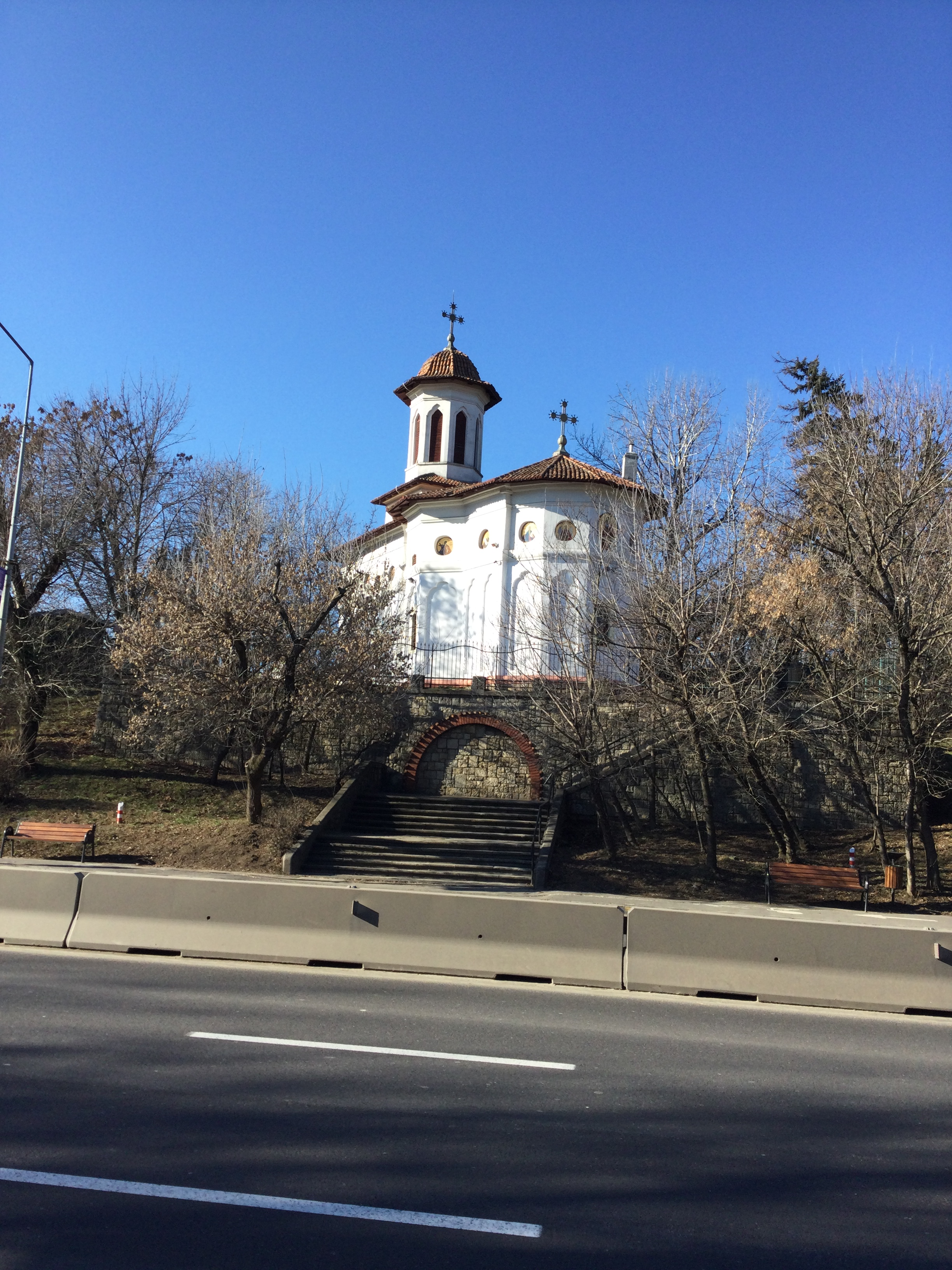
Băneasa Church

The Băneasa Church (Romanian: Biserica Băneasa) is a Romanian Orthodox church located at 6-8 Șoseaua București-Ploiești, close to Lake Băneasa in the Băneasa district of northern Bucharest, Romania. It is dedicated to Saint Nicholas.

== History ==
The church was initially a chapel for the nearby houses of the boyar Văcărescu family. Its ktetorissa was Ecaterina, the widow of high ban Ștefan Văcărescu. Begun in 1768, it was completed in 1792, as attested by the pisanie above the door. Only the vault painting is original. In 1845, when heiress Maria Văcărescu married Prince Gheorghe Bibescu, the estate passed to the ruler, who soon carried out repairs on the church, consolidating the exterior walls.

Following the 1864 land reform, it became a parish church. Further repairs took place in 1888, 1932–1934 and after the 1940 earthquake, when the bell tower was restored. Meanwhile, in the 1930s, as a highway was being built below, the hillock on which the church sits was reinforced with a protecting wall and stone staircase. Work carried out during the latter part of the 20th century saw the church being re-sanctified twice, in 1971 and 2002.

The cross-shaped church is 18 meters long by 5.8 to 7.5 meters wide, with a slightly enlarged narthex, and polygonal apses just in relief. The portico has three frontal three-lobed arches and one on each side, resting on four columns. The current octagonal bell tower, above the narthex, dates to the 1940 restoration. The nave has a small vaulted dome, and the altar apse is quite long. The facade is divided into two sections by a belt course; the upper one features medallions painted in circular niches, while the lower has simple frames akin to those on the portico. The roof is made of tiles.

The church is listed as a historic monument by Romania's Ministry of Culture and Religious Affairs.
