= Manu Cavafu Church =

Heritage site in Bucharest, Romania

Coordinates: 44°24′52.3″N 26°06′22.9″E

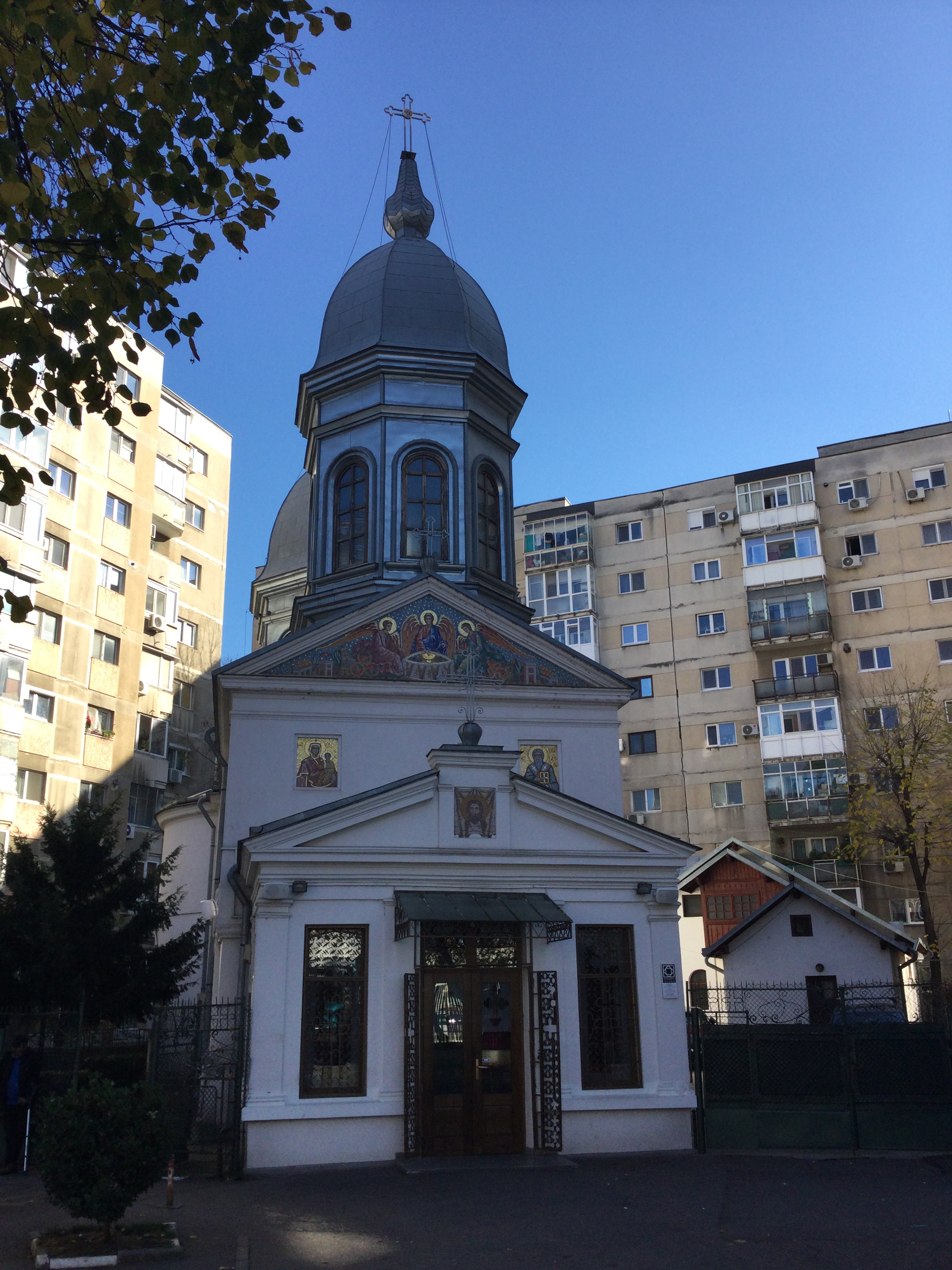
Manu Cavafu Church

The Manu Cavafu Church (Romanian: Biserica Manu Cavafu) is a Romanian Orthodox church located at 4 Gheorghe Șincai Boulevard in Bucharest, Romania, near Tineretului metro station. It is dedicated to the Holy Trinity and to the Archangels Michael and Gabriel.

The date of the church’s construction was not precisely known until 1969, particularly as the pisanie (inscription) is partly deteriorated. That year, the parish priest discovered a petition from the Christians of the Broșteni district to the Metropolitan of Ungro-Wallachia. Authored by Manul "Cavaful", head of the shoemakers’ (cavafi) guild, the document asks permission for building a church on the land of the late Hagi Dumitrache Papazoglu, in accordance with his will. It is dated July 1815, and construction probably started on August 15, a date mentioned on the inscription. The structure was probably erected by summer 1816, and was completely finished by November 1817, as attested by a document of that date.

Repairs were carried out in 1868, 1891 and 1906, while the painting was redone in 1929. Thorough repairs took place in 1949–1950 and 1957. Repainting was done under Patriarch Justinian, whose portrait appears among the ktetors. The 1930 parish house was demolished in 1985 to make way for the surrounding apartment blocks. The church has two spires, one above the nave, the other, the bell tower, above the narthex. The iconostasis is carved in wood and gilt. The facades are simple, with a classical cornice and pediment on the western side, painted with three panels of saints’ icons.

The church is listed as a historic monument by Romania's Ministry of Culture and Religious Affairs.
