= Dichiu–Tirchilești Church =

Heritage site in Bucharest, Romania

Coordinates: 44.4476°N 26.1106°E

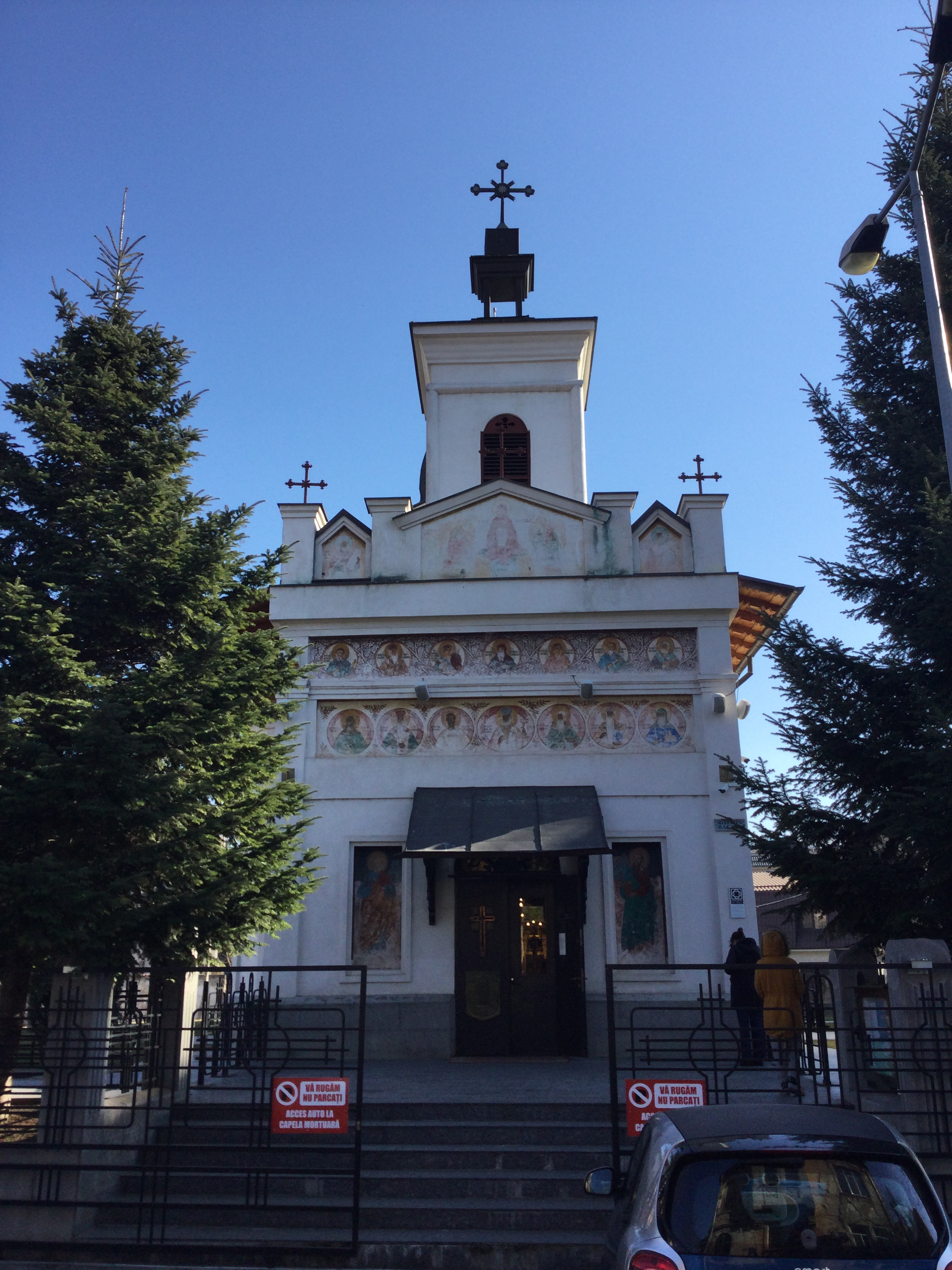
Dichiu–Tirchilești Church

The Dichiu–Tirchilești Church (Romanian: Biserica Dichiu–Tirchilești) is a Romanian Orthodox church located at 72 Icoanei Street in Bucharest, Romania. It is dedicated to Saint Nicholas.

The church existed by 1773, but lacks a pisanie or other inscriptions attesting its precise origins. Its name comes from two sources: Deoghen, traditionally considered the ktetor, was dichiu or oikonomos of the Metropolis of Ungro-Wallachia; while he was assisted by a certain Tirchilă. For some years, the surrounding area was a village called Tirchilești, incorporated into Bucharest by 1789. Local tradition holds that the church initially served a skete of monks, which ceased to exist when the city extended its boundaries, transforming the building into a parish church. In 1880, it was extended and a wooden dome added. Repairs took place in 1898 and 1903. The interior was painted in fresco in 1949–1953, while exterior repainting was carried out in 1955.

The church measures 22 meters long by 6–10 meters wide, and is situated on an elevation. It is cross-shaped, with polygonal exterior apses, an octagonal dome above the nave and, above the narthex, a square bell tower. The latter is topped by a cross sitting on a small roof lantern supported by four slender columns. Interior columns were demolished, while the formerly open portico is entirely closed by masonry, ending in a flat facade with two small pylons at the ends. The exterior was frequently modified as well: the string course does not survive, and the sides feature arches in the lower part, medallions in the upper. The entrance is flanked by icons of Saints Peter and Paul. Two rows of seven saints each, with floral decorations, sit above the entrance, as does the patron saint's icon.

The church owns a restored Gospel Book and relics of Saints Paraskeva of the Balkans, Stephen, John the New of Suceava and the Forty Martyrs of Sebaste, all displayed in a silver hand. It is listed as a historic monument by Romania's Ministry of Culture and Religious Affairs.
