= Sapienței Church =

Orthodox church in Bucharest, Romania

Coordinates: 44°25′53″N 26°05′35″E

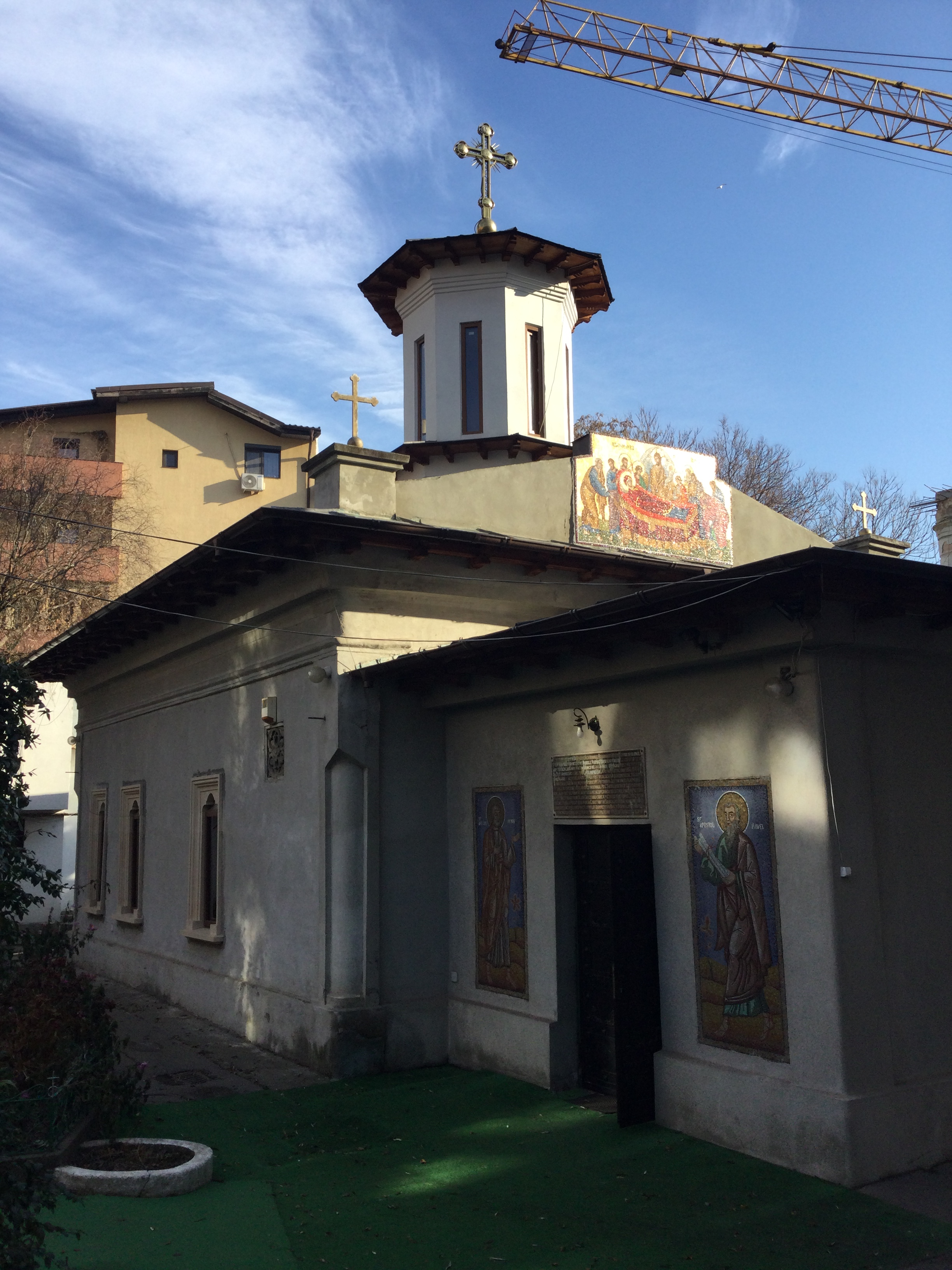
Sapienței Church

The Sapienței Church (Romanian: Biserica Sapienței) is a Romanian Orthodox church located at 5 Sapienței Street in Bucharest, Romania. It is dedicated to the Dormition of the Mother of God.

The church was built in 1710 by Vornic Iordache Krețulescu and his wife Safta, the daughter of Constantin Brâncoveanu. Together with the surrounding houses, the church passed from father to son as a family chapel until Manolache-Emanoil Krețulescu sold it to his mother-in-law Olimpia Lahovary. She restored the chapel in 1884, when an aging Gheorghe Tattarescu painted the interior. It was then opened to the public. In 1898, Olimpia willed the property to her son Alexandru Em. Lahovary, who closed the chapel in 1902. He rented the houses to the Holy Synod, headquartered there for a time. During this period, the chapel was used for administering oaths, for example during the clerical trial of Metropolitan Atanasie Mironescu.

In 1931, Lahovary donated the chapel and parish house to the Patriarchate, intending that the public once again be admitted. Upon a request from the Office for Heroes, a World War I memorial society with offices across the street, the property was granted to its keeping. Instead of opening for worship as stipulated, the organization used the church as storage space, leading to its deterioration. The Patriarchate sanctified and reopened the church for community worship in 1941. It underwent a thorough restoration in 1966–1968, when a closed portico was added. In the 1980s, under Nicolae Ceaușescu, the church was threatened with demolition, officially in order to make way for the Mihai Vodă Monastery to be moved in its place; the plans were dropped after concerted opposition emerged.

The church is small and low-ceilinged, with a single rectangular nave measuring 10 meters long by 8 meters wide. The attractive iconostasis is carved in wood. The square portico is on the west side, with a narrow balcony above the entrance. The facades are not ornamented. The rectangular stained-glass windows depicting saints date to 1947. The grounds feature a landscaped garden.

The church is listed as a historic monument by Romania's Ministry of Culture and Religious Affairs.
