= St. Nicholas–Șelari Church =

Heritage site in Bucharest, Romania

Coordinates: 44°25′57″N 26°06′04″E

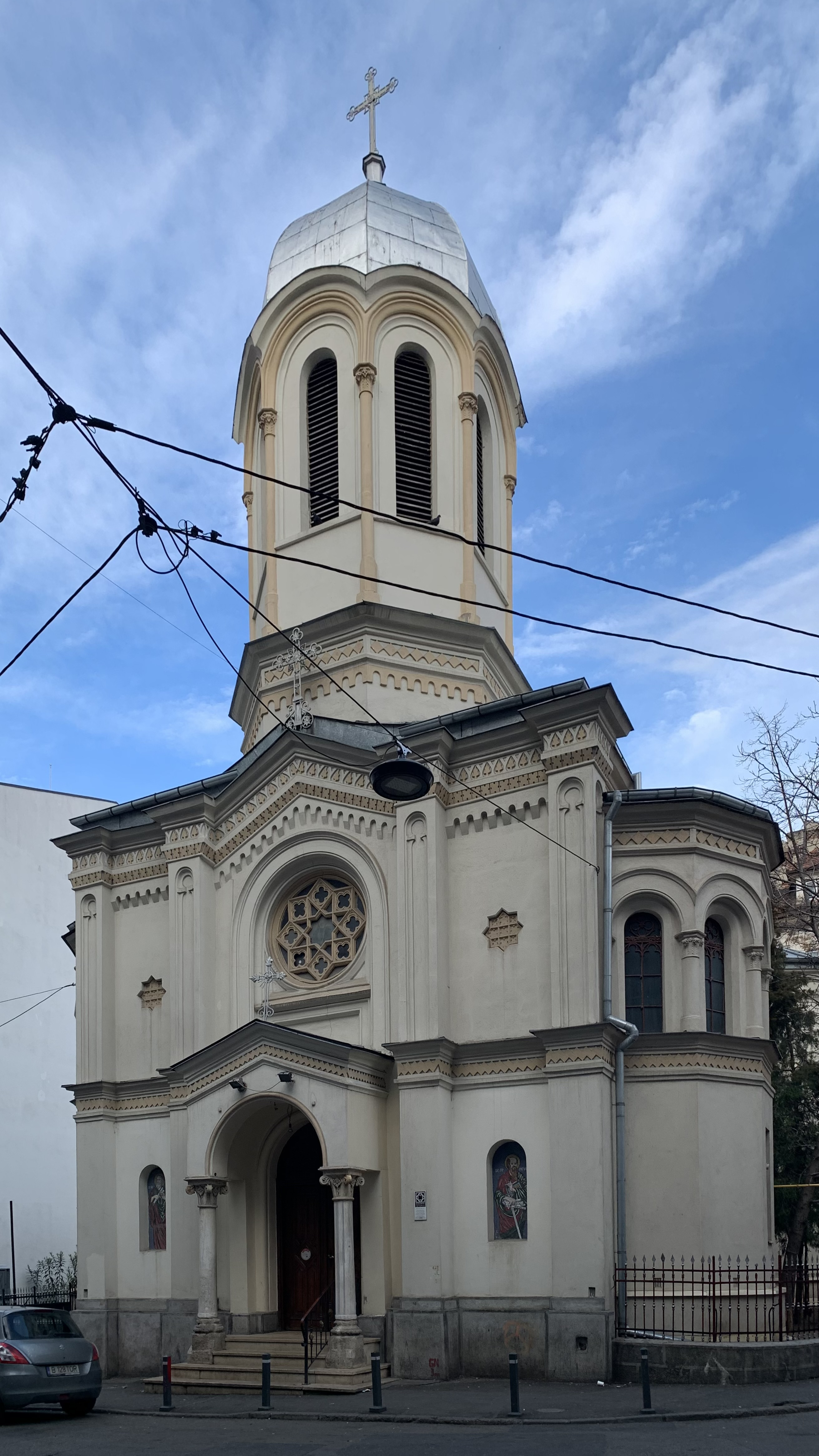
St. Nicholas–Șelari Church

St. Nicholas–Șelari Church (Romanian: Biserica Sfântul Nicolae–Șelari) is a Romanian Orthodox church located at 16 Blănari Street in the Lipscani district of Bucharest, Romania. It is dedicated to Saint Nicholas.

A first church, likely of wood, existed in the vicinity in the 17th or even the 16th century. It is attested in a 1664 document, and mentioned in records from subsequent decades. The church was rebuilt in masonry in 1699–1700; the main ktetor was Paharnic Șerban II Cantacuzino. Severely damaged during the 1802 earthquake, it was rebuilt in a different form over the following two years. In the mid-19th century, it was the church of the chandlers’, cotton-weavers’ and barbers’ guilds. After being badly damaged by the Great Fire of Bucharest, it was demolished in 1860. The rubble of the old church was reused, forming a wall up to four meters thick.

Work on the new church proceeded slowly. In 1867, when Prince Carol visited, he was shown the difficult situation and promptly promised a donation from his personal funds. His grant of ten thousand gold coins made the prince a ktetor. The interior painting by Gheorghe Tattarescu dates to the same period. The general aspect of the church, with its Greek- and Gothic Revival touches, goes back to the 1866-1868 rebuilding. Repairs took place in 1903, 1921–1925, 1940, 1971 and, following the appearance of serious cracks due to the 1977 quake, in 1978–1985. Archaeological observations in 1996 determined that the remains of the Cantacuzino church are embedded in the foundation, some three meters below ground.

The church is cross-shaped, measuring 25 meters long by 9–16 meters wide. The polygonal Christ Pantocrator dome sits atop the nave, while the octagonal bell tower is above the outer part of the narthex. The altar apse has nine exterior faces, like its 1700 predecessor, and is semicircular on the interior. The facades, which feature a richly decorated cornice, are divided into two sections by a row of bricks. The large lower windows are rectangular, while the upper ones are arched. The western facade features upper and lower pilasters in strong relief, a central recessed rose window, a small triangular pediment and a cornice with palmettes. Four steps lead to a portico framed by an arch supported on two marble columns.

The church is listed as a historic monument by Romania's Ministry of Culture and Religious Affairs.
