= Dobroteasa Church =

Heritage site in Bucharest, Romania

Coordinates: 44°25′56″N 26°05′52″E

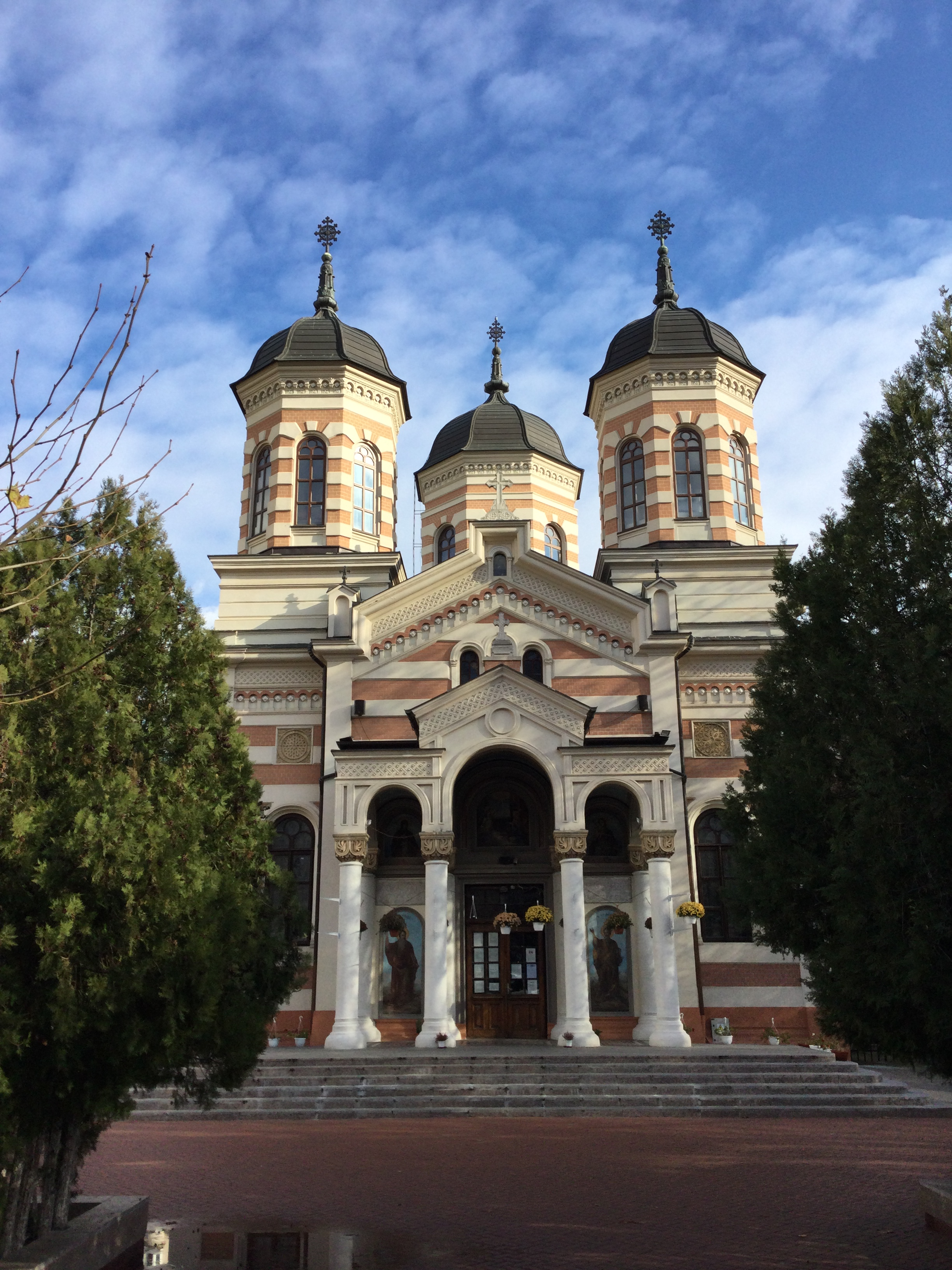
Dobroteasa Church

The Dobroteasa Church (Romanian: Biserica Dobroteasa) is a Romanian Orthodox church located at 35 B Mircea Vodă Boulevard in Bucharest, Romania. It is dedicated to the Annunciation.

According to Nicolae Iorga, the name Dobroteasa may derive from an Old Church Slavonic term for the Virgin Mary, or from the wife of a certain Dobrotă who may have endowed the original 17th century church. According to the pisanie, a masonry church was built on the site in 1730, with Vistier (treasurer) Constantin Năsturel as ktetor; earlier, a small wooden church had stood there. Damaged by the 1838 earthquake, it was restored in 1847. By 1884, the church again lay in ruins, and the city authorities ordered its demolition.

The current church was begun in 1887, completed in November 1892 and, nearly a year later, dedicated with great pomp by Metropolitan Ghenadie Petrescu. Gheorghe Ioanide painted Biblical scenes on large panels between 1893 and 1894. The carved oak choir seats are decorated with griffins and a crown with cross, the coat of arms of the Năsturel family. Thorough repairs took place in 1955–1958. Consolidation work began in 1985, following the 1977 quake. The church was shut down in 1986 and slated for demolition by the Nicolae Ceaușescu regime. A foundation was dug in front, and was meant to support an apartment block that would have blocked the view of the church from the street. That project was abandoned after the Romanian Revolution. The church reopened in 1991 and intermittent repairs took place subsequently.

The cross-shaped church is fairly large, at 21 meters long by 8–11 meters wide. The entrance is preceded by a portico with three elongated arches, the middle one higher. They are supported by columns with Byzantine Revival capitals. The vestibule has two side towers. The narthex has a spherical ceiling, while the nave has deep, semicircular side apses. The Pantocrator dome, not very large, sits on ample pendentives painted with saints’ icons in medallion. The facade alternates between rows of five bricks and stone in relief. The octagonal domes on square bases are decorated in similar fashion. An ornamented belt surrounds the facades, including the pediment; rosettes are placed beneath this, inspired by the Curtea de Argeș Cathedral. The large windows terminate in a circular arch; around the narthex, they come in pairs. The two priests’ entrances are preceded by small porticoes.

The church owns old icons and religious objects of value. It is listed as a historic monument by Romania's Ministry of Culture and Religious Affairs.
