= Foișor Church =

Heritage site in Bucharest, Romania

Coordinates: 44°24′53″N 26°07′23″E

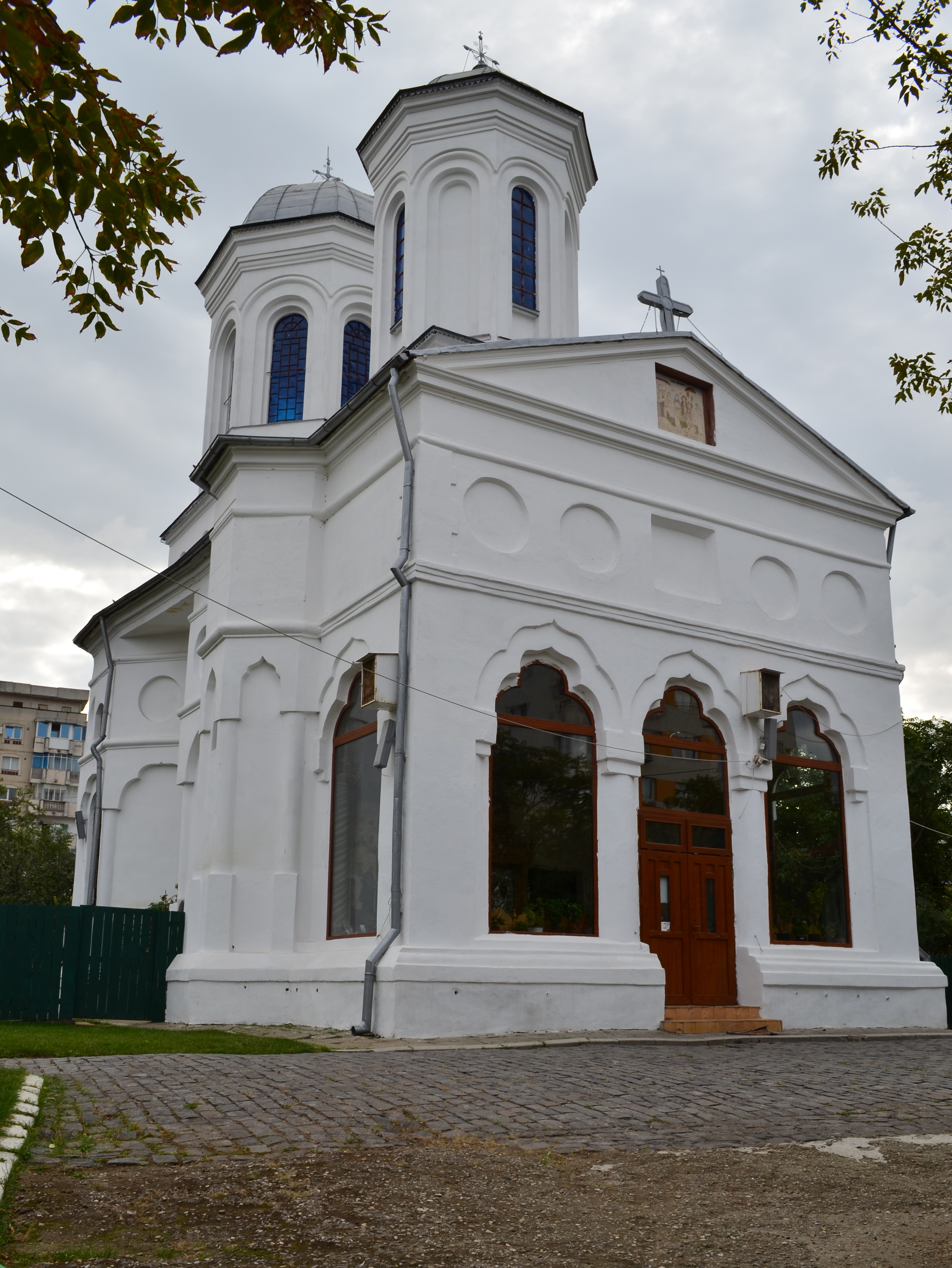
Foișor Church

The Foișor Church (Romanian: Biserica Foișor) is a Romanian Orthodox church located at 119 Foișorului Street in Bucharest, Romania. It is dedicated to the Nativity of Mary.

== History ==
Situated on a hillock, the church was founded by Smaranda, the third wife of Prince Nicholas Mavrocordatos, as a chapel for her houses. The pisanie is from November 1745, marking the date of completion. The houses offered a fine view of the Dâmbovița River. They were linked across swampy ground to the Văcărești Monastery by a wooden bridge provided with a turret or foișor, giving rise to the name of the district and church. The church and houses were placed under the authority of Radu Vodă Monastery, which owned the area. Ban Mihail Cantacuzino mentioned the church as possessing an inn, namely the houses. By 1813, the building was in ruins and needed repairs, carried out in 1849. The iconostasis was damaged by the 1838 earthquake.

Until 1880, the open portico served as a church school for the children of parishioners; a church singer would teach pupils to read the Horologion and the psalter. In 1888-1889, the portico was enclosed with glass and the windows enlarged. An ambon was installed and the old frescoes covered in oil paintings by Gheorghe Tattarescu. A lead roof was added in 1914-1915, while an altar entrance room was added to the southeast. Serving as a vestry and, in the basement, as a deposit for liturgical items, the small area is decorated similarly to the facade. The interior, maintaining much of its original appearance, is in contrast with the exterior, modified during the 19th century. In the 1980s, when the neighborhood underwent systematization, the architect in charge deliberately omitted the church from the plans he presented to dictator Nicolae Ceaușescu, in order to protect it from demolition.

== Description ==
The cross-shaped church measures 20.3 meters long by 8.7 meters wide, with an ample dome above the nave and a bell tower above the narthex. The octagonal domes sit on square bases; their windows fit into recessed semicircular arches. The narthex and portico area is significantly broader than the nave. There is a cornice between the side apses and the narthex, beneath the joint roof. The portico features three frontal three-lobed arches; the pediment above ends in a cross. The portal leading to the narthex has a Brâncovenesc frame with floral motifs. The pisanie sits above, displaying the Wallachian coat of arms. The door, from 1757, has a special lock, signed by its maker, the carpenter Andrei.

The facades are divided into two sections of unequal size, separated by a simple string course. On the lower side, there is a series of arched frames resting on simple columns; the windows, ending in arches, are between these. The upper part is narrow. On the west and north sides, there are medallions, once painted; on the south, horizontal fluting in the masonry and tracery carved in stone. The portico has a vaulted ceiling and consolidated arches. The narthex ceiling, typical for the 18th century, is also vaulted, ending in pendentives and wide lateral arches. Portico and narthex are separated by a wall with three three-lobed arches held up by stone columns with slightly twisted double fluting. The capitals, bases and two supports of the columns, decorated with flowers in relief, are characteristic of the Mavrocordatos era. The columns on the side walls are worked simply in masonry. The main dome rises above the austere nave, held up by arches and pendentives.

The 18th-century masonry iconostasis has door frames with accolades. The bishop’s throne to the right and the side seats are finely carved in wood. The ktetors’ portraits are on the right side of the narthex. The churchyard is entered beneath a belfry built later. Fragments of the old houses, built using narrow bricks, survive. There are two old stone crosses inscribed in Romanian Cyrillic. The church is listed as a historic monument by Romania's Ministry of Culture and Religious Affairs.
