= Manea Brutaru Church =

Heritage site in Bucharest, Romania

Coordinates: 44°26′39″N 26°05′21″E

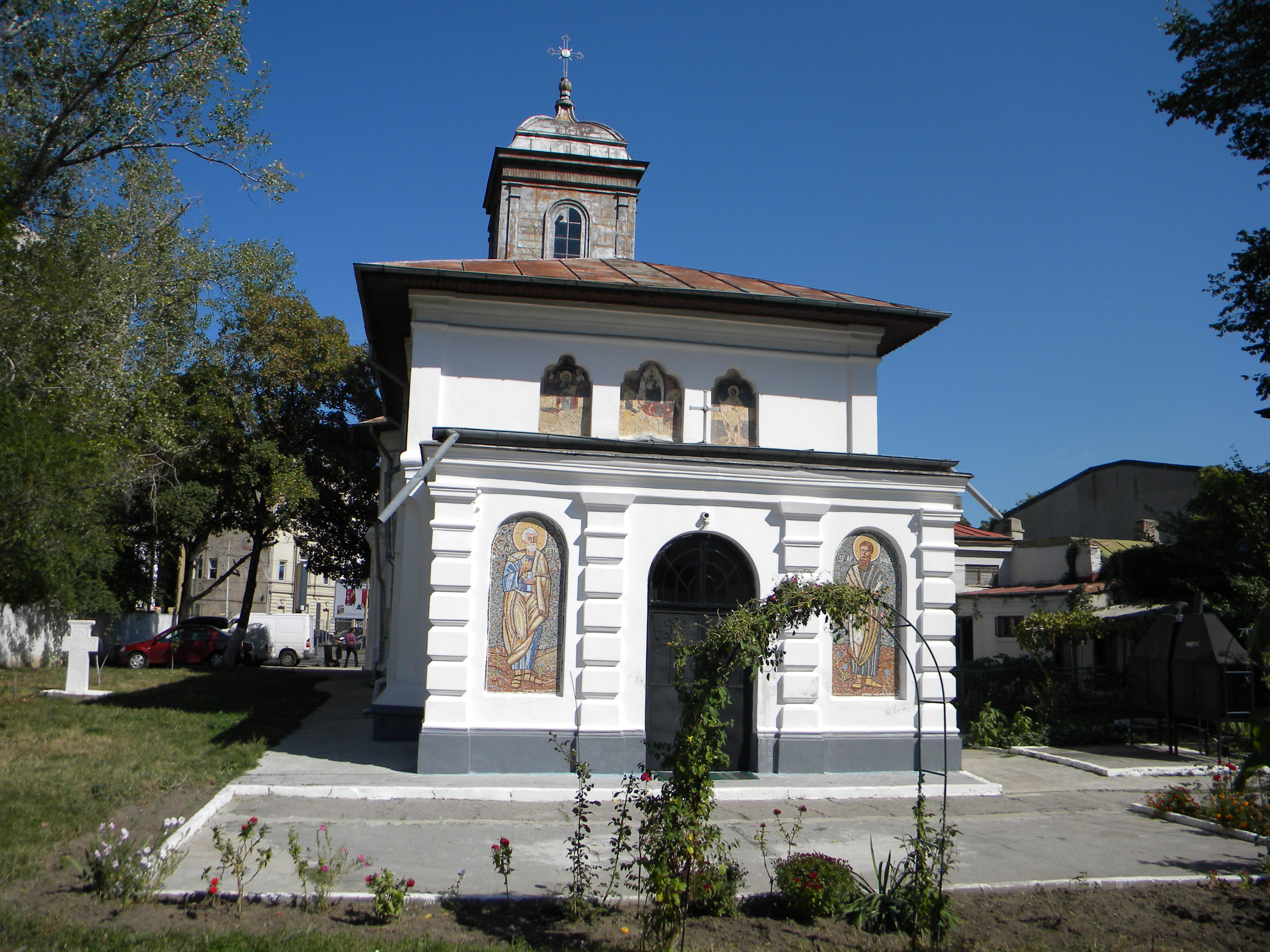
Manea Brutaru Church

The Manea Brutaru Church (Romanian: Biserica Manea Brutaru) is a Romanian Orthodox church located at 4 General Constantin Budișteanu Street in Bucharest, Romania. It is dedicated to Saint Nicholas.

The church was built in 1787 by Manea Brutaru, head of the guild of bakers (brutari), for the members of the Popa Radu parish; he replaced a small wooden church of this name, perhaps founded by a priest named Radu. The new masonry structure was completed on August 15, as noted in the pisanie. In 1798, Prince Constantine Hangerli ordered the construction of two buildings in the courtyard, for housing 80 orphans, both boys and girls. Eight cells were built for this purpose in 1801; later in the 19th century, a school functioned there. The 1838 earthquake severely damaged the church, collapsing its dome. Repairs were carried out in 1858, including a restoration of the iconostasis, brought from a metochion of the Râmnic Diocese. The interior was repainted in 1898.

The church measures 26.3 meters long by 8–10 meters wide, with an enclosed portico that was added later, a large narthex and a three-lobed nave, with two side apses and one at the altar. The short portico and adjacent part of the narthex (8 by 3 meters), above which sits the choir area, date to the 1858 reparation. The narthex has a vaulted ceiling, while the square-based dome, coated in tin, rests on the nave. The facade, which retains a certain degree of Brâncovenesc influence, is divided into two sections by a plain string course. On three sides of the lower half, there are pairs of arched frames flanked by columns. The upper part lacks decoration, except for a few recesses on the east and west painted with icons of saints. The portico facade features pilasters in bossage and contours of neoclassical influence, a style that also informs the cornice, dome and narthex addition. The interior oil painting depicts a series of saints on the walls and a starry sky on the ceiling. It covers older work by a student of Gheorghe Tattarescu.

The yard, which includes a one-floor residential building, is much smaller than in the past; on the north side, there is a stone cross raised by Manea in 1814. The church is listed as a historic monument by Romania's Ministry of Culture and Religious Affairs.
