= Oțetari Church =

Heritage site in Bucharest, Romania

Coordinates: 44°26′20″N 26°06′26″E

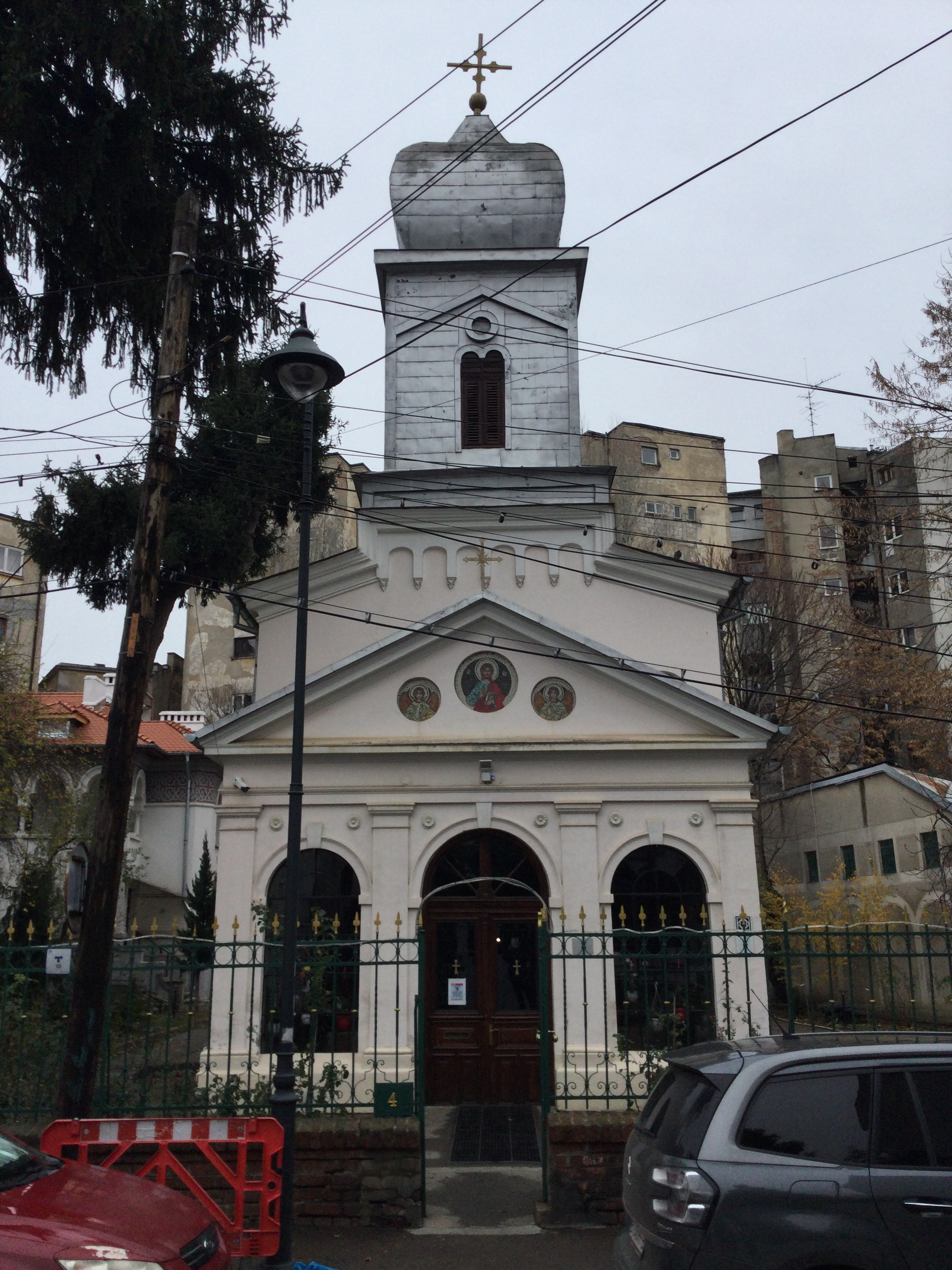
Oțetari Church

The Oțetari Church (Romanian: Biserica Oțetari) is a Romanian Orthodox church located at 4 Oțetari Street in Bucharest, Romania. It is dedicated to the Archangels Michael and Gabriel and to Saint Nicholas.

A wooden church was built on the site in 1681, and rebuilt in 1708. The current masonry structure dates to 1757, as attested by the pisanie in the narthex, which mentions the names of several donors. It was at this point that the church received its second patron saint. A document of 1785, issued by Grigorie II Colțea, Metropolitan of Ungro-Wallachia, indicates that the church was built by locals. It was restored in 1860-1866 by Metropolitan Nifon Rusailă with the help of the Hagi Tudorache family, interred inside. During this time, Gheorghe Tattarescu painted the entire interior. Repairs were carried out in 1906 and 1964, while the painting was restored in 1984. The 39 exterior mosaic medallions date to the late 20th century.

The church is 24.5 meters long, 7.5 meters wide and 11 meters high. Its shape is trefoil, with an octagonal spire above the nave. The portico has a spherical ceiling atop which sits the square base of the bell tower. Both spires end in a bulb-shaped roof. These as well as the main roof are covered in tin. The closed narthex is decorated with pilasters, facade and three arches. The frieze, slightly in profile, features three mosaics of saints.

The church is listed as a historic monument by Romania's Ministry of Culture and Religious Affairs.
