= Merchants' Church =

Orthodox church in Bucharest, Romania

Coordinates: 44°26′03″N 26°06′35″E

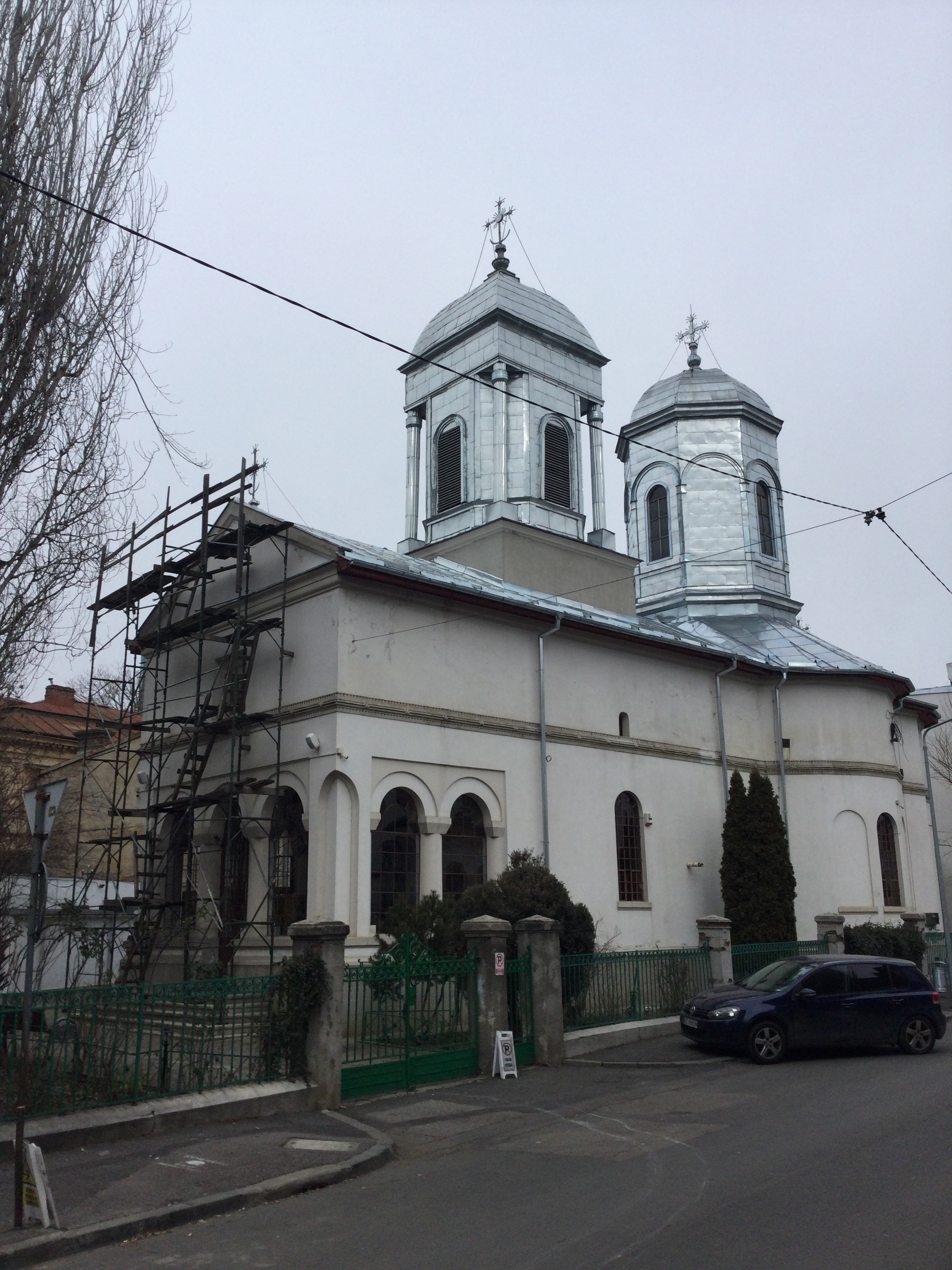
Merchants' Church

The Merchants' Church (Romanian: Biserica Negustori) is a Romanian Orthodox church located at 5 Teodor Ștefănescu Street in Bucharest, Romania. It is dedicated to Saint Nicholas.

The oldest mention of a church on the site dates to 1665; the structure was of wood, with a bell tower. Its roof was of thatch or frame, and the entire church was destroyed by a 1718 fire that ravaged the city center. Under the supervision of Župan Simion Cupețul, it was rebuilt of brick between 1721 and 1726, dates recorded by the pisanie, and was painted by Pârvu Mutu and his apprentices. The 1802 earthquake damaged the structure, with an 1819 document mentioning its “very bad shape”. The 1838 earthquake provoked further damage, leading to its closure for a year. In 1839, High Agha Manuil Serghiad repaired it with his own money, so that he is considered a second ktetor.

Radical repairs took place in 1867-1870, when the two domes were built of wood and tin, in an academic style with Classic Revival touches. The frame roof was replaced with tin. In 1888, Mayor Pache Protopopescu, whose father had been the parish priest, led efforts to enclose the portico with French windows, enlarge the side windows and hire Gheorghe Tattarescu to paint over much of the original fresco. Restorations took place in 1924-1930, including of the newer frescoes. In 1942, as a result of the 1940 earthquake, a wide iron belt was placed on the upper part of the exterior. The 1977, 1986 and 1990 earthquakes enlarged old cracks and caused new ones to appear, while the structural stability was weakened. Consolidation work took place in 2002.

The cross-shaped church measures 27.6 meters long by 8.3 meters wide, and 11.4 meters high. The portico is spacious, with three frontal arches and two on each side resting on cylindrical masonry columns. The portal contains the 1839 pisanie, while the older one is fitted into the left wall. The 1870 bell tower rises above the square narthex; coated in tin, it has a slender column on each corner. An intermediate space, covered by a vaulted ceiling, separates the narthex from the nave. The latter is also square, with two apses, and supports the Pantocrator dome. A wooden iconostasis leads to the altar. A string course divides the exterior into two unequal sections. The pediment, with Neoclassical touches, probably dates to 1870. Nearly all of the surviving original frescoes are in the portico. Illustrating the Psalms, they offer valuable insight into the costumes of early 18th-century Wallachia. Near the altar, there is a small parish house, donated to the church in 1872.

The church is listed as a historic monument by Romania's Ministry of Culture and Religious Affairs.
