= Greek Church (Bucharest) =

Heritage site in Bucharest, Romania

Coordinates: 44°26′19″N 26°07′04″E

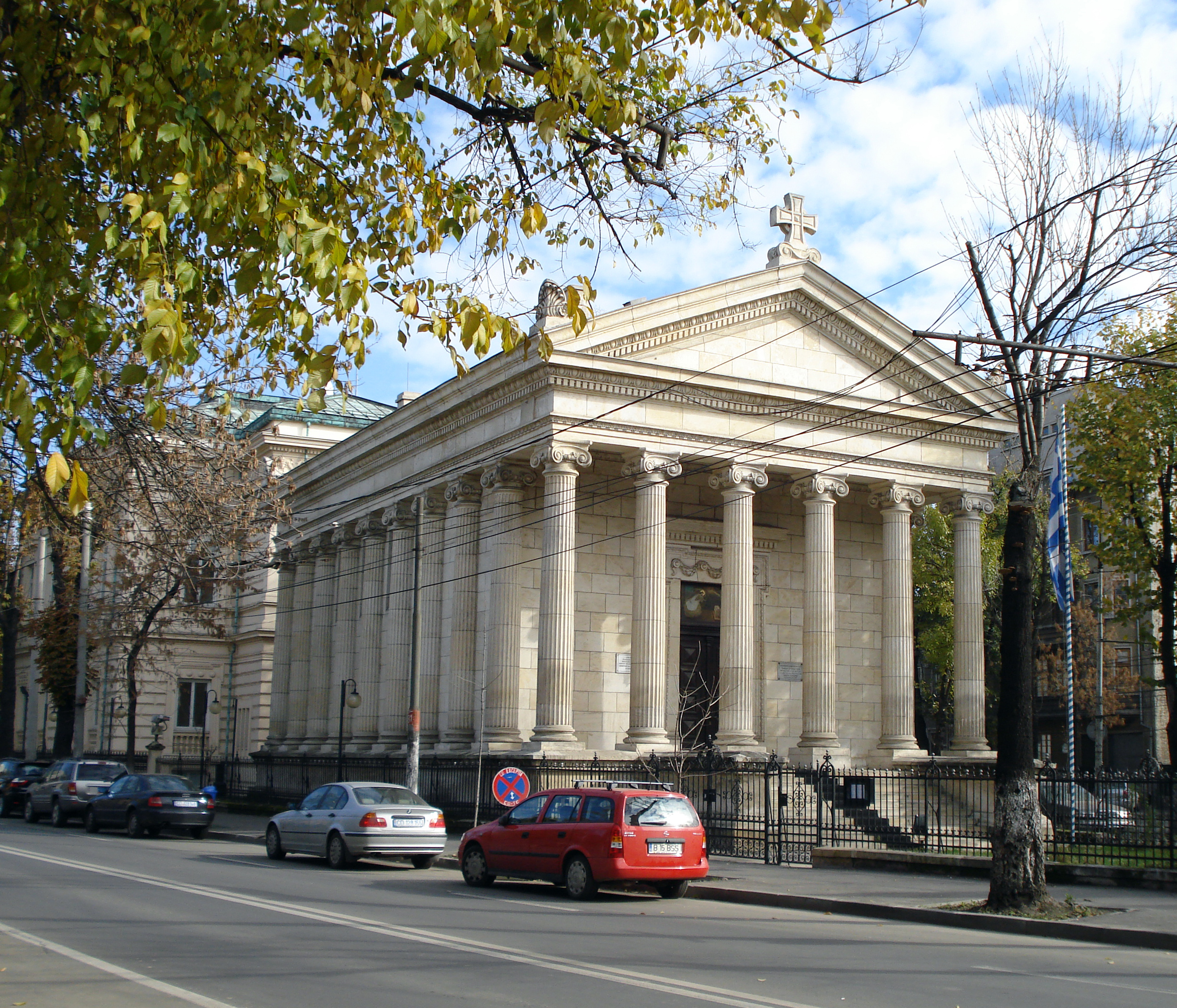
Greek Church

The Greek Church (Romanian: Biserica Greacă) is a Romanian Orthodox church located at 1 Pache Protopopescu Square in Bucharest, Romania, on the grounds of the Greek Embassy. It is dedicated to the Feast of the Annunciation.

== History ==
The church was built on the site of an old Greek cemetery that once extended until Foișorul de Foc. During the 19th century, members of the local Greek community did not have their own church, instead worshiping at other parishes, in particular the Kalenderoglu Church. The idea of building a specifically Greek church appeared as early as 1874, but internal divisions and lack of land, authorization and funds delayed the start of construction for a quarter century.

In 1890, a local Greek banker expressed a desire to build a church. The Bucharest City Hall soon granted the embassy’s request for it to cede land on which this could be built, together with a school. In 1898, the lot, measuring some 1900 square meters, was purchased by the Greek chargé d’affaires. Construction began in 1899, financed by the Harokopos brothers and other wealthy Greeks. The first Divine Liturgy was held on the Greek National Day in 1901, two years to the day after the cornerstone was laid. The building and interior painting were restored around the year 2000.

== Description ==
The church measures 24 meters long by 13.5 meters wide, and on the exterior resembles an Ionic ancient temple; its direct inspiration is the Temple of Hephaestus. It is a hexastyle pseudoperipteros made of stone and brick masonry. Twelve imposing stairs lead to the stylobate, where stand the six slender, fluted columns of the west portico, situated three meters from the wall with the entrance portal. The latter has a wide stone frame, with a classical profile, three garlands above and a sawtooth cornice. The long sides feature ten columns each, of which nine are embedded in the facades. The main and rear facades, topped by a cross, have pediments and parapets.

The interior begins with a vestibule, followed by a nave subdivided by two rows of four Corinthian columns, not fluted, of stucco marble. The vaulted ceiling is painted, while the floor is marble. Light enters through four windows on each of the two sides; these are stained with the Greek cross in blue and white. The iconostasis is of white marble and fairly short, allowing the painting of the altar ceiling to be seen. Its central part is framed by two small partly fluted columns, covered by a pediment below a cross. Above the royal doors there is a painting of the Last Supper. Carved flowers and branches, along with niched icons, round out the iconostasis, behind which sits a carved wooden baldachin. The wooden cathedra in the nave are carved with lions’ heads. The Byzantine revival interior painting is in panels, with Christ Pantocrator inscribed in a large ceiling medallion.

The structure is surrounded by a high, artistically carved cast-iron fence. In 1999, a sculpture of Rigas Feraios was placed in front. The church is listed as a historic monument by Romania's Ministry of Culture and Religious Affairs.
