= Scaune Church =

Heritage site in Bucharest, Romania

Coordinates: 44°26′07″N 26°06′20″E

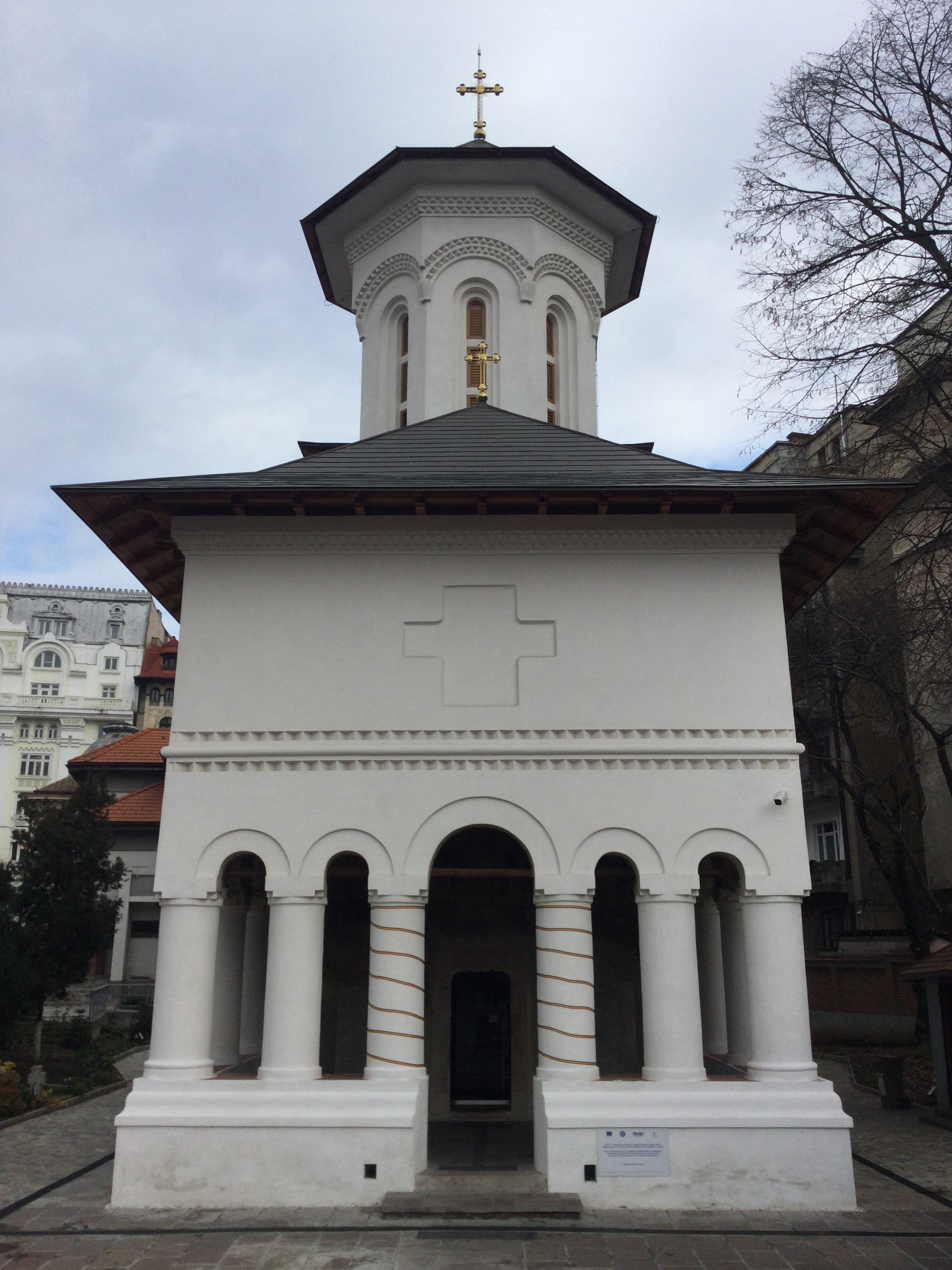
Scaune Church

The Scaune Church (Romanian: Biserica Scaune) is a Romanian Orthodox church located at 2 Scaune Street in Bucharest, Romania. It is dedicated to the Dormition of the Mother of God and to the Nativity of Mary.

The pisanie indicates the presence of a wooden church in 1611, and a list of priests in the parish archive begins with that year. The first documentary mention dates to 1669, with additional records later in the 17th century. The name derives from the surrounding district, and refers to the wooden slabs on which butchers cut meat. In its first two centuries, it was also known as Măcelarilor (Butchers’) and Săpunarilor (Soap makers’). The present church is located on the same site; the pisanie records that it was completed in 1705. A merchant willed funds for the purpose, which were granted by his nephew. In 1843, the portico arches were enclosed in masonry, while the exterior was plastered and repainted. It was repaired again in 1878, and once more in 1915, when it lay in ruins.

The church was closed from around 1908 to 1939. At that point, repairs started under architect Ștefan Balș-Lupu, who opened the arches and tiled the roof. In 1944, the surrounding soil was cleared away, as the terrain is around one meter higher than the base of the church. New flooring was installed on the interior and exterior. The iconostasis, dating to the early 18th century, was restored, as was the baldachin. The interior frescoes are original, their date and author unknown; these too were cleaned and repaired. The church reopened on August 15, 1944, the primary feast day, and was reconsecrated on September 8, the second feast.

The cross-shaped church measures 27.1 meters long by 8.3 to 12 meters wide, with thick walls. Its only dome, the octagonal bell tower with recessed arches above the narthex, was rebuilt in 1954. There was originally another one above the nave, which was not restored, and the central part of this section has a vaulted ceiling. The portico features ten thick brick columns supporting five quite narrow arches on the western facade (the central one being larger) and two on each side. It has two vaulted ceiling sections. The stone portal is carved with floral designs. The wooden door is coated in tin, signed by a worker in 1795. The exterior decoration is light: a string course between two rows of brick set in sawtooth pattern, a cornice with a similar design and windows with simple stone frames. The cornice and dome base feature specially positioned bricks. The parish house dates to 1947.

The church is listed as a historic monument by Romania's Ministry of Culture and Religious Affairs.
