= Colțea =

Colțea may refer to several entities in Romania:

- Colțea, a village in Roșiori Commune, Brăila County
- CS Colțea Brașov, a football club
- In Bucharest:
  - Turnul Colței
  - Colțea Hospital
  - Colțea Monastery
