= Calea Moșilor =

Street in Bucharest, Romania

Coordinates: 44.442666°N 26.118643°E

- Podul Târgului de Afară, or Ulița Târgului de Afară (both meaning the Street of the Outside Fair)
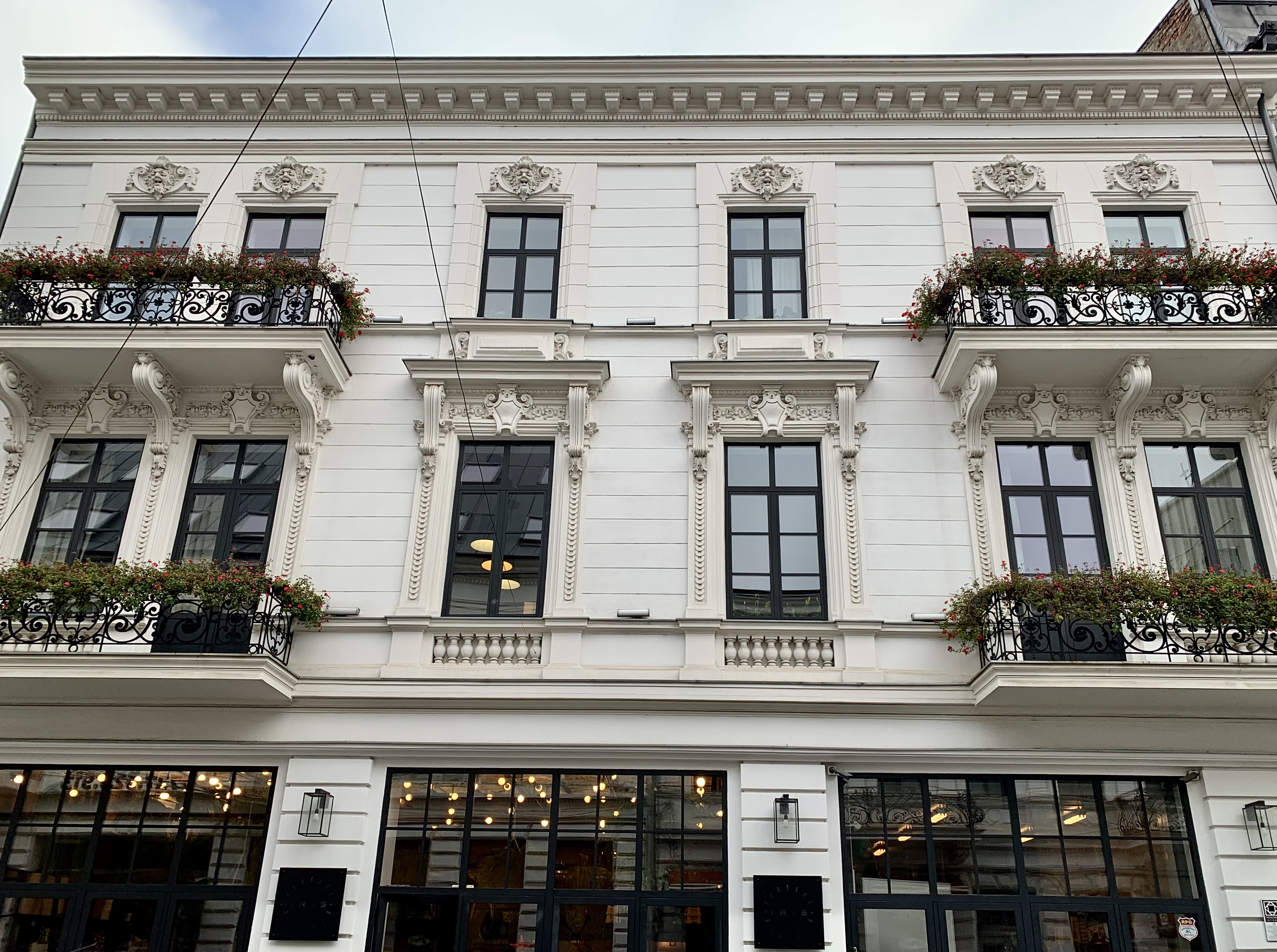
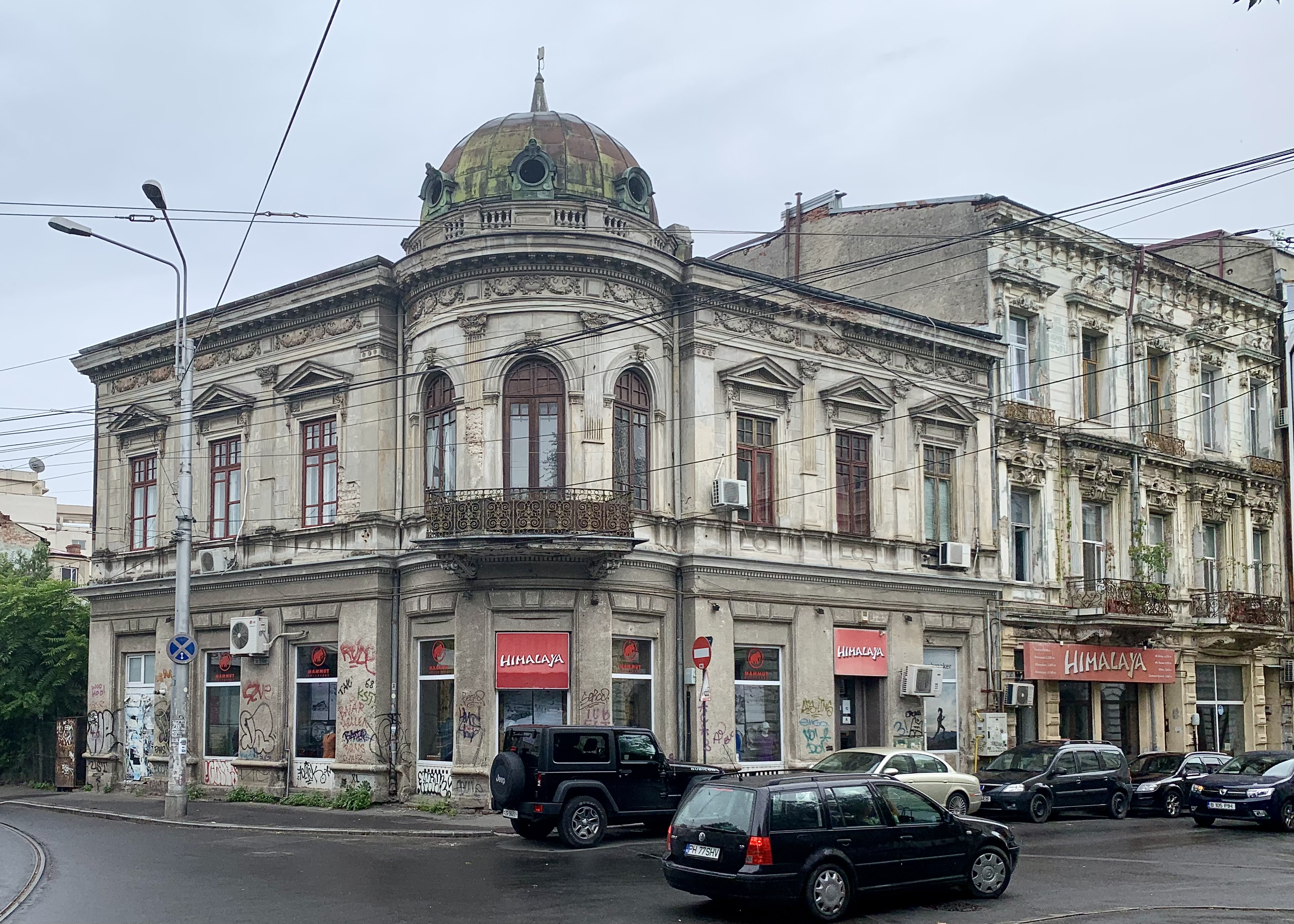
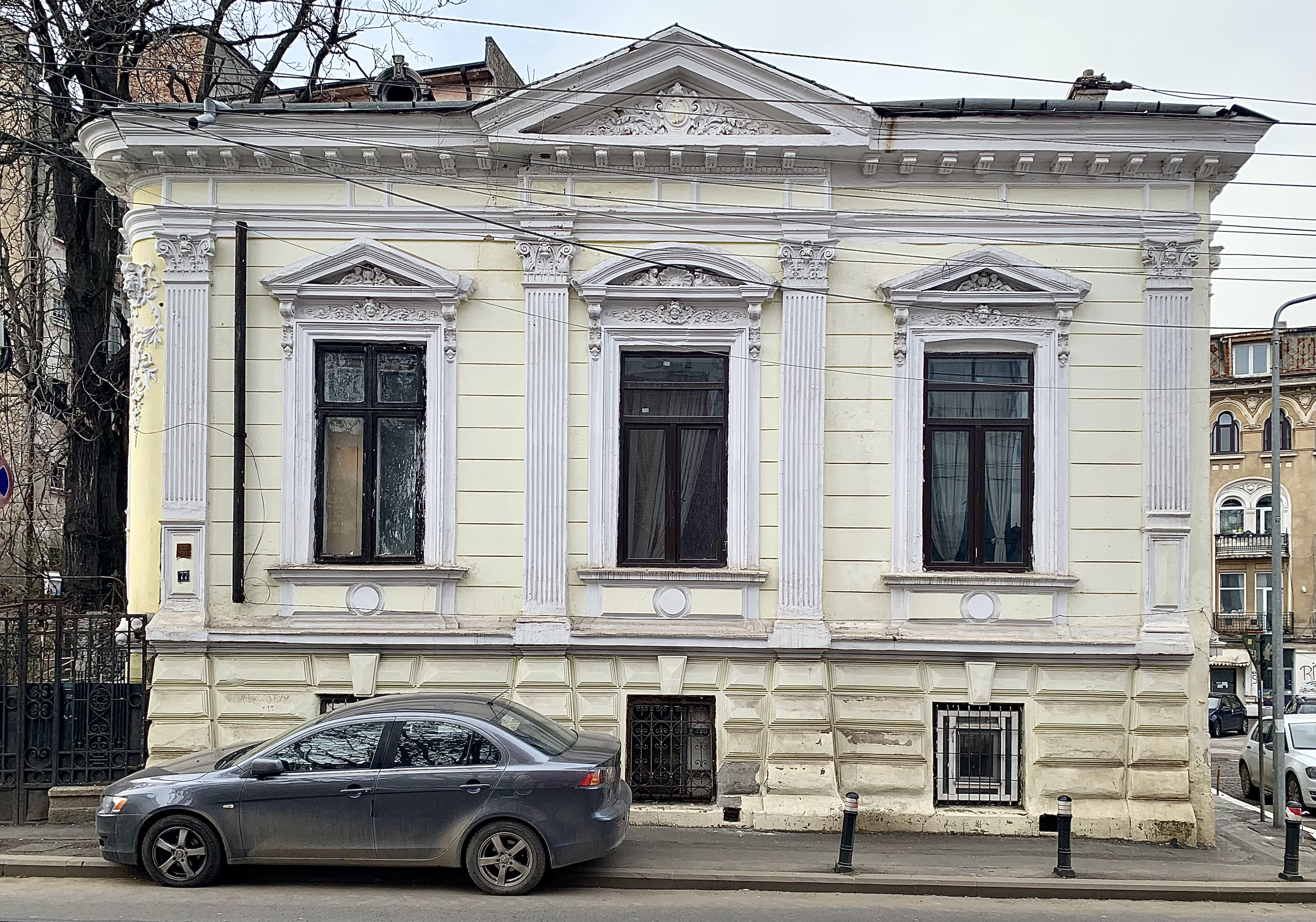
- Belle Époque architecture on Calea Moșilor, on the part between Strada Bărăției and the intersection with Bulevardul Carol I
- Interactive map of Calea Moșilor
- Length: 2.660 km (1.653 mi)
- Location: Sectors 2 and 3 of Bucharest, Romania
- South-west end: Strada Bărăției
- North-east end: Obor

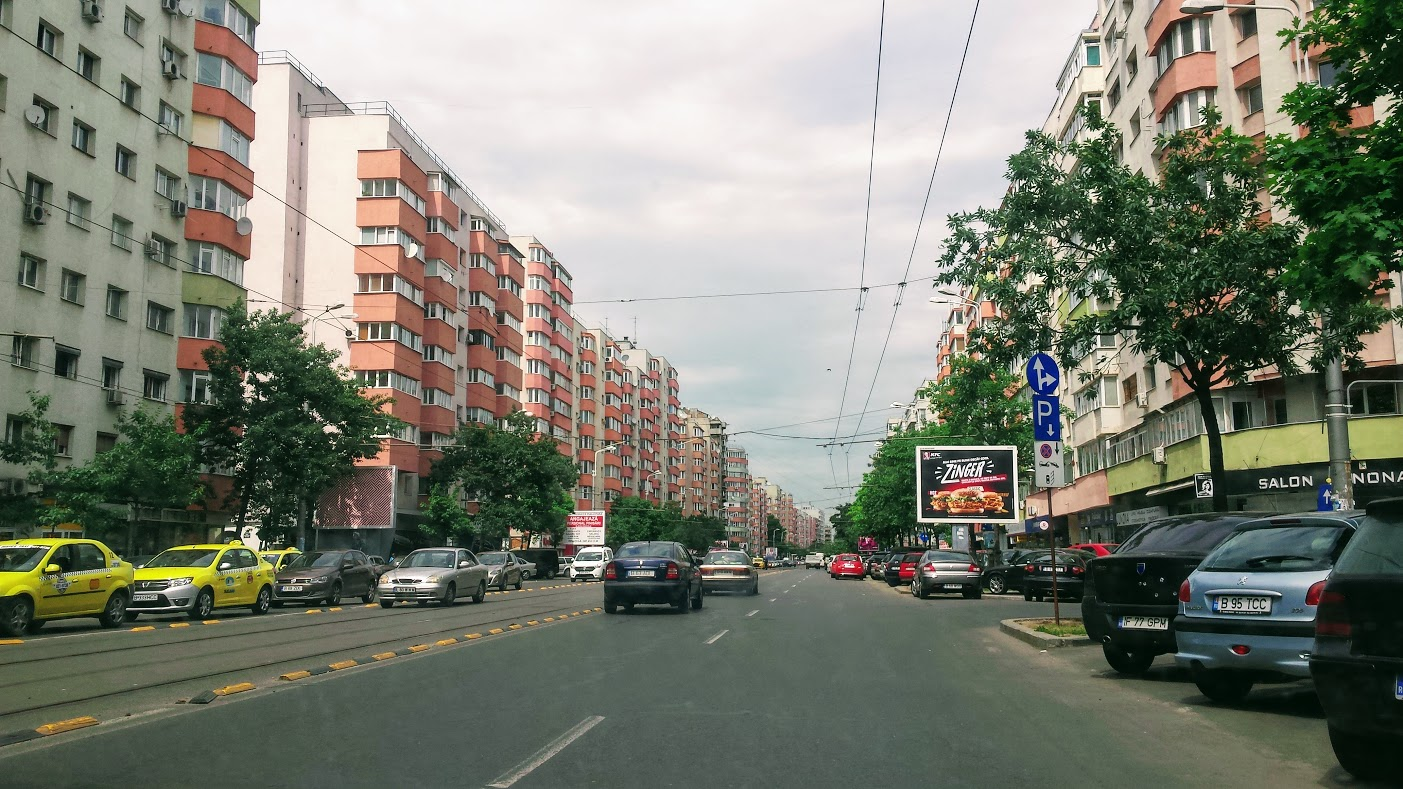
Calea Moșilor between Carol I Boulevard and Obor, nowadays with 1980s apartments

Calea Moșilor (Romanian pronunciation: [ˈkale̯a ˈmoʃilor], Moșilor Avenue) is both a historic street and a major road in Bucharest, Romania. It runs from the back of the Cocor Shopping Mall (near Piața Unirii), in Sector 3 to Obor, in Sector 2.

The street is divided into two distinct parts. East of the intersection with Carol I Boulevard, the street has two lanes and consists of apartment blocks built during the communist era, while West of the intersection with Carol I Boulevard the street has only one lane and consists of houses built in the 19th century.

== History ==
The old name of Calea Moșilor is Podul Târgului din Afară which translated means The Bridge of Outside Fair (also market or even field), referring to a big fair held outside the city. Why "the Bridge" (Romanian: pod)? Probably because all main roads in medieval Bucharest were "paved" with wood and had a resemblance to a bridge. In any case, pod was a common name for a major road in Wallachia into the 19th Century. For example, Calea Victoriei was once known as Podul Mogoșoaiei. Most of the main roads were Prince's Roads (alternatively "Princely Roads", Podurile Domnești) and they usually started from the nearby Curtea Veche (Old Princely Court). Podul Târgului din Afară was in fact one of the major streets of medieval Bucharest.

It was a Prince's road that had its beginning at St. Anton square/market, close to Curtea Veche. The street was much shorter in the past, the city limits being just somewhere at Saints' Church (Biserica Sfinților) towards the northeast, at junction with Strada Sfinţilor. This was the first known location of the Outside Market. Later, the city expanded and city limits were moved towards Oborul Vechi Church and Fire Watchtower (Foișorul de Foc). Because it was meant to be an out of city market, these new limits became the next location of Târgul de Afară. The city limits were eventually moved farther, and the road extended accordingly. Târgul de Afară found its destination in the place which is now known as Obor Market Piața Obor. Târgul de Afară became Târgul Moșilor, a famous fair throughout Wallachia held twice a week, which was the direct precursor of Obor Market. From here on heading towards North-East, the road was making connection to cities from Moldavia, but also cities like Brăila, or Lvov.

The street itself was filled on both sides by small shops, tradesmen workshops, taverns, porter houses, small inns, churches, and more.

The end of Podul Târgului de Afară near Piața Obor was also the place where convicted people were executed by hanging. This is the place where famous bandit Iancu Jianu was supposed to be executed for his outlaw activity but one of the noble ladies of the Court, Sultana Gălășescu, saved him from the death penalty by taking him as a husband. They had two children afterwards.

Calea Moșilor was the first street paved with cobblestones in Wallachia in 1825. Slowly all the streets in Bucharest took the same turn and wooden "bridges" were forgotten for good.

Between 1978 and 1982 the old historic streets between Carol I Boulevard and Obor were demolished and replaced with 8 to 10 stories tall apartment blocks, and the road was widened from 2 lanes to 4 lanes with integrated tram tracks. In 1987 a trolleybus line was added. Nowadays the area has seen redevelopment and refurbishing of older apartments. The old Calea Moșilor between Carol I Boulevard and Unirii Square has been kept the same, but over the years some of the houses have been abandoned and dilapidated.

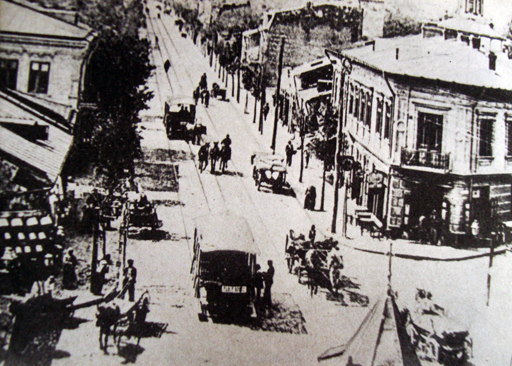
Calea Moșilor in the 1900s

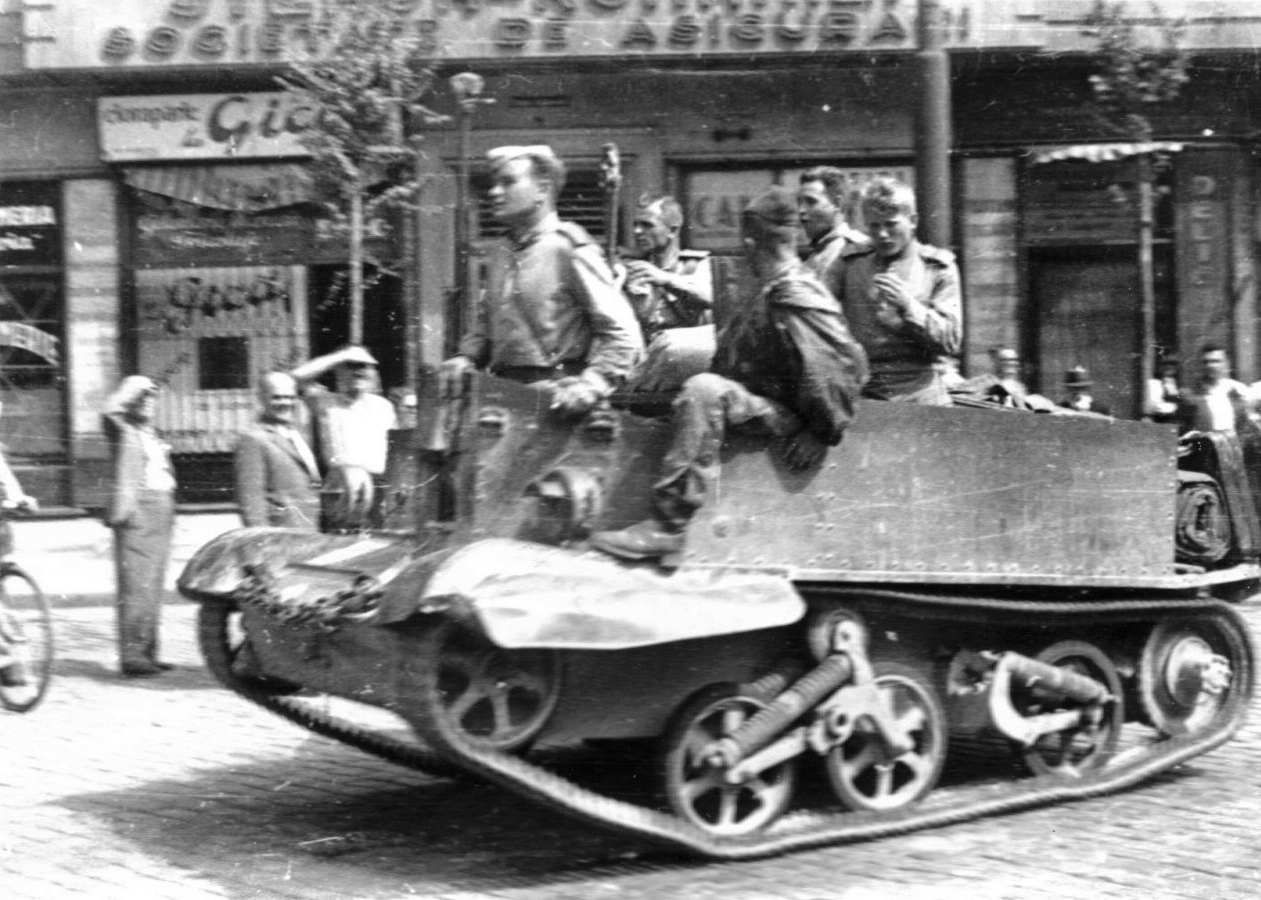
Red Army in Bucharest near Carol I Boulevard, in August 1944

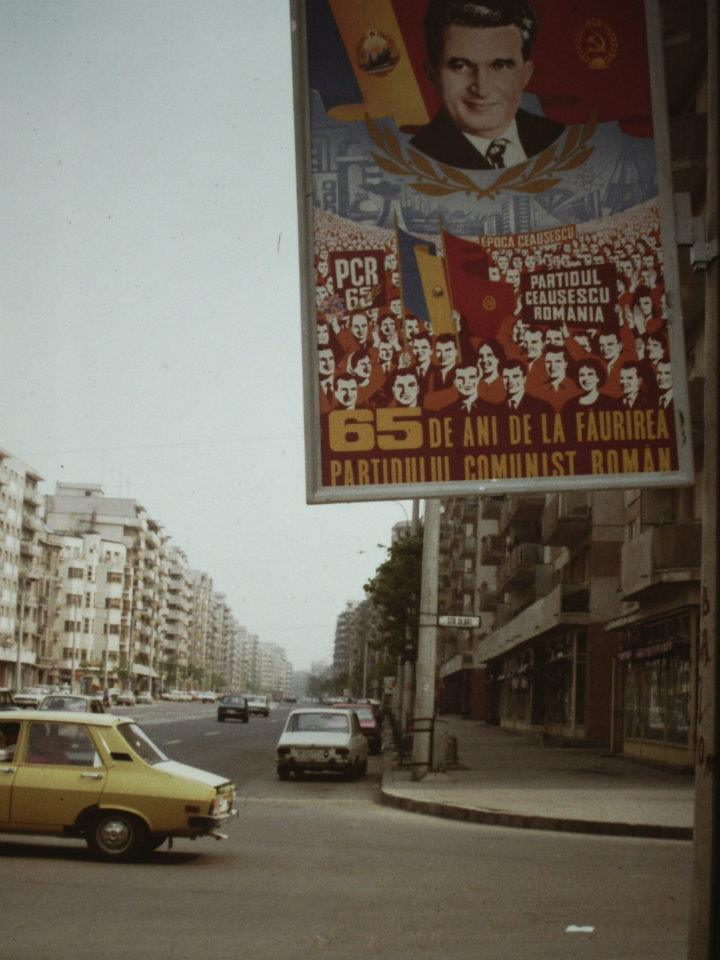
Calea Moșilor close to Carol I (then Republicii) in 1986. Notice the Ceaușescu propaganda poster

== Transportation ==
RATB tram line 21 runs along the street, and trolleybus 66 runs until Bulevardul Carol I, where it joins the other trolleybus lines towards Piața Universității.
