= Veranda Mall =

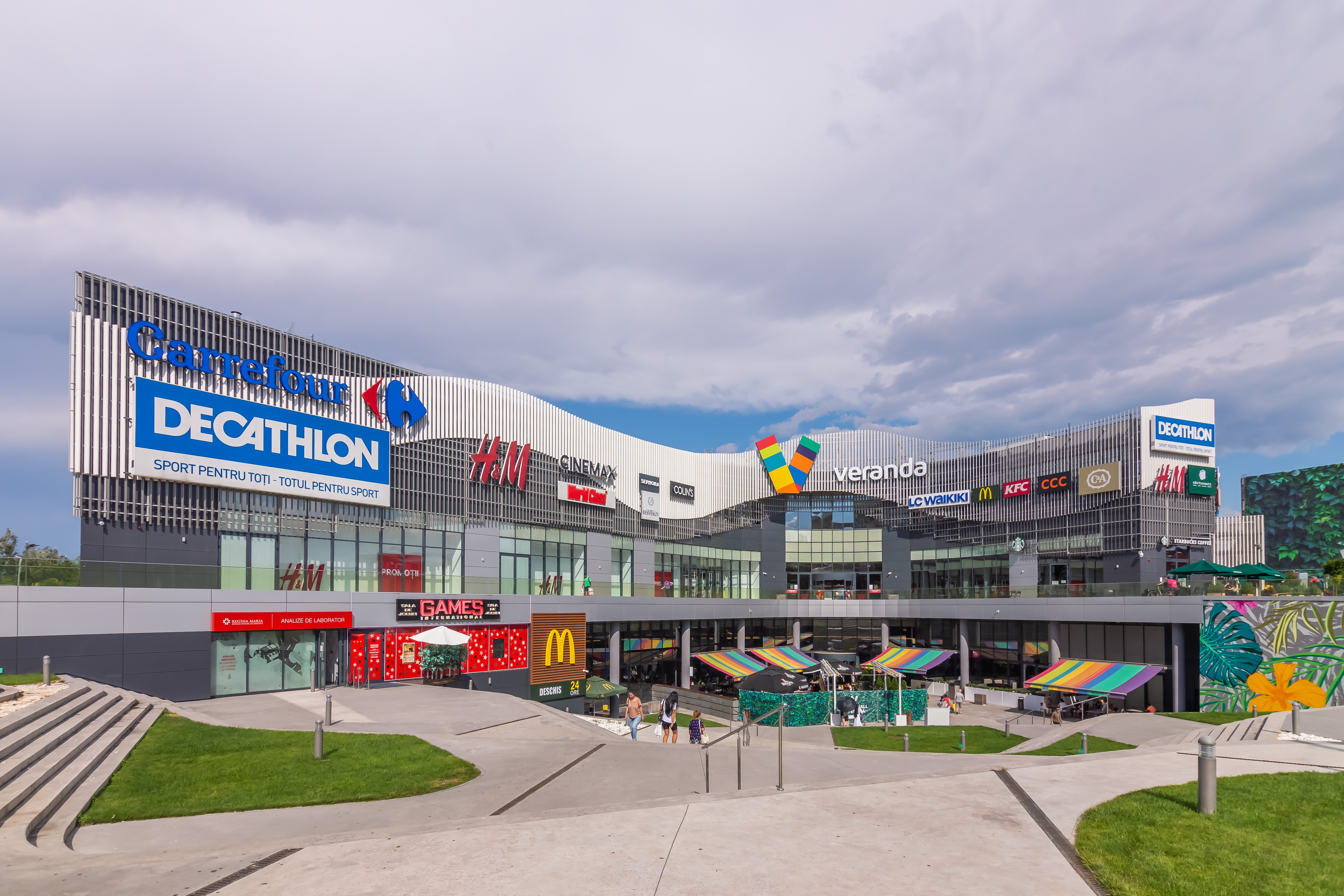
- Coordinates: 44.450422°N 26.129731°E
- Opened: October 27, 2016
- Developer: Professional Imo Partners S.A
- Manager: Maria Crăciun
- Owner: Pogonaru family
- Architect: Chapman Taylor
- Num. of stores: over 100
- Floor area: 30,000 m^{2} (320,000 sq ft)
- Floors: 5
- Parking: 1,200 places
- Public transit: M1 Obor metro station
- Website: verandamall.ro

Veranda Mall is a shopping mall located in Bucharest, Romania, in the Obor neighborhood. It lies on Ziduri Moși Street 23, close to the Obor metro station, and it was inaugurated on October 27, 2016.

The shopping mall was developed by Professional Imo Partners SA (formerly known as Prodplast Imobiliare S.A.), following a €60 million investment, and it is currently owned by the Pogonaru family. With a 30,000 square metres (320,000 sq ft) floor space, it includes 18 fashion and footwear shops, restaurants, children's playgrounds, a cinema and a gym, as well as a 10,000 square metres (110,000 sq ft) Carrefour hypermarket, the first anchor tenant that was contracted by Veranda Mall.

== History ==
=== Location ===
On the site on which the shopping mall is currently located, there used to be the Prodplast plastic factory. The factory was first relocated on an industrial platform, and then outside Bucharest, to the small town of Buftea.

=== Architecture ===
Veranda Mall was designed by Chapman Taylor, an international architecture firm from Great Britain, with an extensive portfolio of urban rehabilitations and shopping mall developments. Given that the mall serves over 400,000 people living in the Obor, Colentina, Ștefan cel Mare, and Moșilor neighborhoods, Veranda Mall was designed to fit the local area and to reflect a sense of modernity.

The shopping mall is built on five levels, and the owners wanted it to be an area of green space in a district full of industrial halls. Presently, Veranda Mall has 15,000 square meters of green space, including a park and a playground, and the name "Veranda" was chosen to reflect this "breath of fresh air in the overcrowded and traffic-suffocated area".

=== Expansions ===
At the end of 2019, following a €10 million investment, Veranda Mall entered an ample expansion process. Following that, Cinemax, the largest cinema operator in Slovakia, opened their first multiplex in Romania, with 12 screens and a restaurant with a terrace.

Also, during the expansion project, Veranda Mall opened the first Decathlon store located in center Bucharest and a World Class Romania gym. The expansions consisted of over 6,000 square meters of additional space and brought the shopping mall to a 96% occupancy rate.

=== Launching Veranda Mall Online ===
In June 2020, in the context of the COVID-19 pandemic that saw the shopping malls being closed down throughout Romania, Veranda Mall became the first mall that implemented an online platform to help their tenants sell their products online.

The ecommerce was developed with the help of Vtex, the online payments are processed via PayU, and Poșta Panduri is in charge of the deliveries. Among the shops that had joined the Veranda Mall Online when it launched are Miniso, Tabor, English Home, Meli Melo, Bizarr, and Senior Tailor.

== Transit ==
Veranda Mall is located on Ziduri Moși street, 23, Bucharest. The shopping mall is 500 meters away from the Obor metro station (M1), and it is surrounded by no more than 15 public transport stops.

=== Public transport ===
- Metro: M1 Obor metro station
- Trams: 1 - Bucur Obor station
- Tram: 21 - Ziduri Moși station
- Tram: 36 - Piața Obor station
- Bus: 143 - Ziduri Moși station
- Buses: 101 - Halele Obor station
- Trolleybus: 66 – Ziduri Moși station

== The connection to the Obor neighborhood ==
=== Veranda Mall as a proximity shopping center ===
Veranda Mall was designed from the very beginning as a proximity shopping center, which respects the local neighborhood's traditions, has accessible shops and a generous green space area, but which also includes public services for the community.

In November 2017, the mall opened an office of the clerk and recorder (Direcția Publică de Evidență Persoane și Stare Civilă - DPEPSC Sector 2). The office was initially located in a 100 m^{2} (1,100 sq ft) space in the basement of the shopping center, which in March 2020 was moved into a bigger area of 300 m^{2} on the second floor. Also, during the expansion project, the Romanian Post opened a postal office with a surface of 31 m^{2} (330 sq ft) in Veranda Mall.

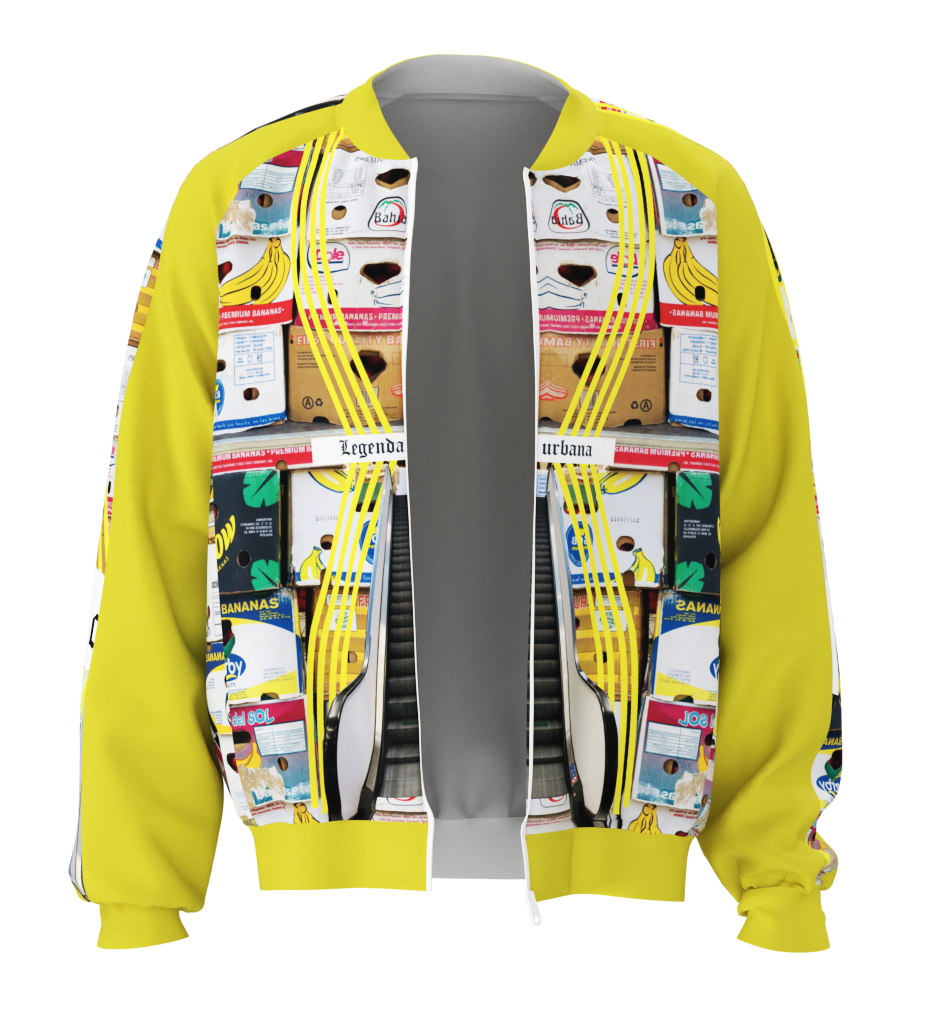
Yellow bomber jacket from the Veranda Mall clothing line.

=== Projects dedicated to the neighborhood ===
==== Obor Lifestyle ====
As a proximity mall located in a neighborhood with a rich history, Veranda Mall launched in 2019 a new communication pillar called Obor Lifestyle. Thus, the shopping mall supported the local community by promoting and encapsulating its distinctive elements and values.

Also part of the Obor Lifestyle campaign, Veranda Mall launched the 2019 Fall-Winter collections with a photo shooting in the Obor Market and other emblematic places in the mall. One of the posters that promoted the new trends was displayed on a huge billboard in Gangnam Square, one of Seoul's busiest neighborhoods.

Another project dedicated to Obor was Portraits from the neighborhood (Portrete de cartier), in collaboration with Asociația Antistatic. It consisted of a gallery with artistic pieces that portrayed the habits and the specificity of Obor. The pieces were displayed in Veranda Mall at the end of 2019.

==== The Mici Grill ====
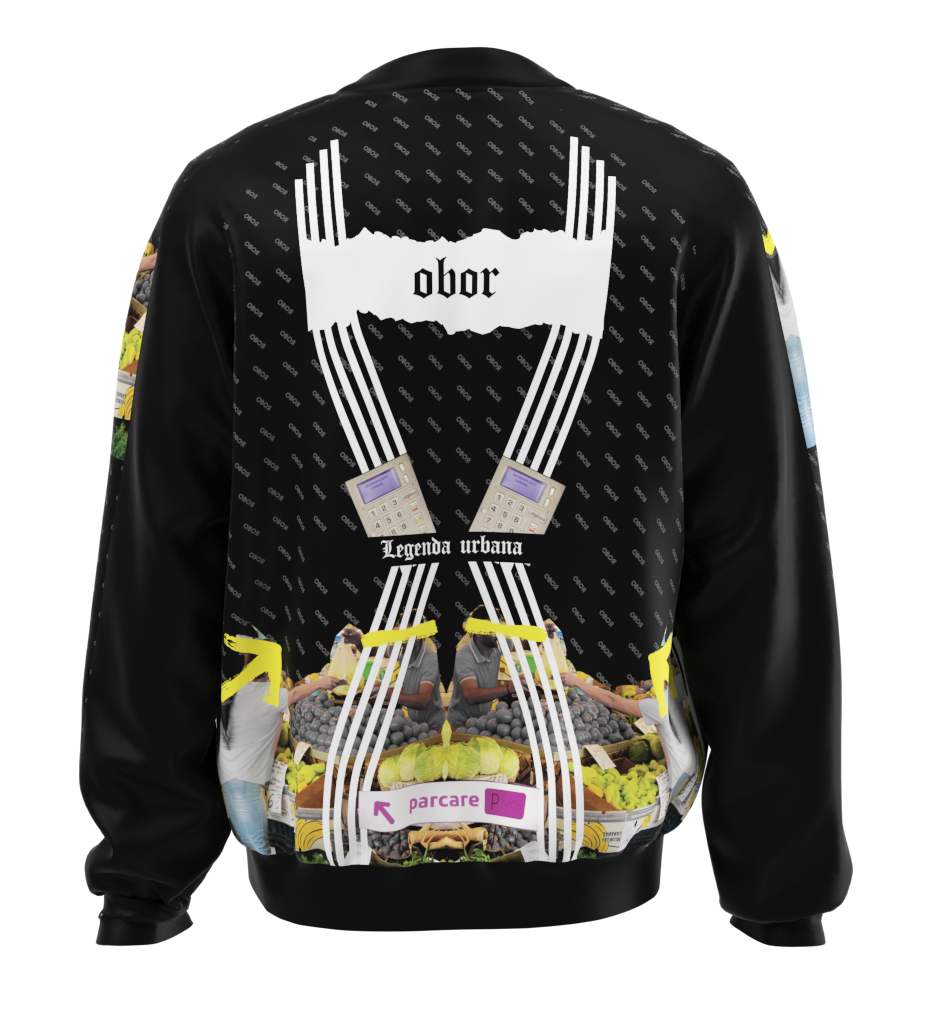
Black bomber jacket from the Veranda Mall clothing line.

Among Veranda Mall's campaigns to promote the Obor neighborhood, one of the most notable ones was the Mici Grill, an Instagram augmented reality filter that went viral on the 1st of May, 2020. The filter encouraged Romanians to celebrate Labour Day responsibly by respecting the social distancing norms imposed by the COVID-19 lockdown. In Romanian culture, Labour Day is usually celebrated by grilling mici, a Romanian mince meat dish, and gathering with friends and family.

The idea to launch an Instagram AR filter came by the fact that in recent years the mici prepared by the Obor Terrace have become emblematic to Obor Market's image and for the neighborhood. The terrace gained in popularity in recent years, being a signature place for the area.

The filter crossed Romanian borders and was used by thousands of people from Germany, Russia, and Ukraine, reaching more than 10 million views on Instagram. The campaign was awarded second place for Best Use of Instagram at the 2020 Webstock Awards.

==== The first clothing line inspired by Obor neighborhood ====
In October 2020, Veranda Mall launched the first capsule collection for a Romanian mall. It includes dresses, pants, jackets, shirts, and hoodies, all designed in the athleisure style, with prints that represent real elements that can be found in the Obor Market or in Veranda Mall.

The design was signed by Tammy Lovin in collaboration with the brand mysimplicated, and Ana Tobor, the first Romanian virtual influencer, was the face of the collection. Tammy is an industrial designer whose works have been on display in New York, at the Museum of Design.

The clothing line is meant to celebrate the Obor neighborhood through fashion. With the help of their style and prints, the clothes accentuate the cultural diversity that the neighborhood is known for, and the mall becomes part of the multicultural and versatile area.

== Shops ==
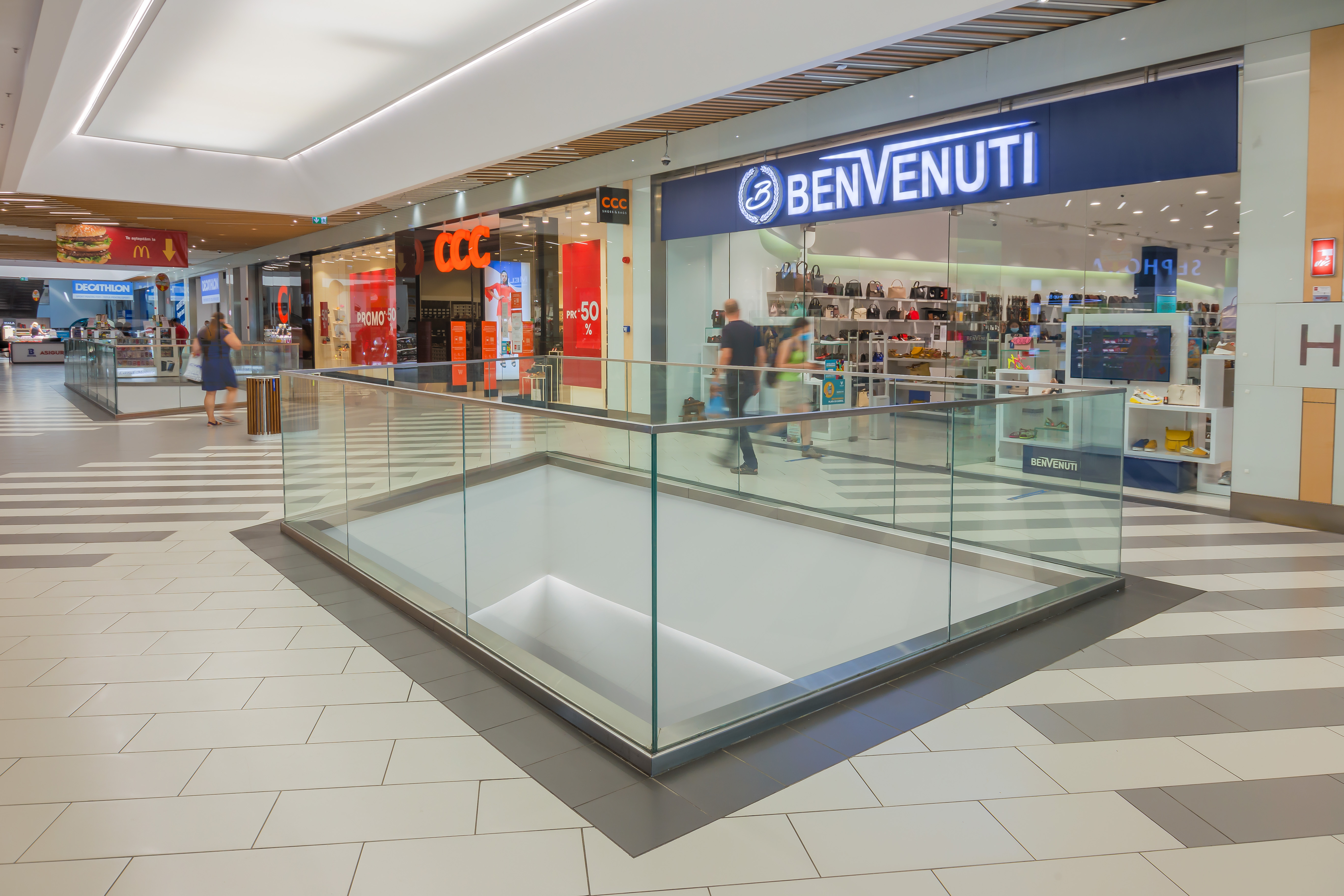
Shops inside Veranda Mall

The main anchors of Veranda Mall are Carrefour, Decathlon, and H&M, which is located on two floors and is approximately 2,000 m^{2}. Also present in the mall are C&A, with a surface of 1,600 m^{2}, CCC, with over 500 m^{2}, and Deichmann, with approximately 450 m^{2}. Altex also has a shop in the commercial center, with a surface of 600 m^{2}.

=== Fashion shops ===
The fashion shops, which include clothing, footwear, and accessories, present in Veranda Mall are Bizzar, C&A, Colin's, Deluka, H&M, Jolidon, LC Waikiki, Mercari, Orsay, Penti, Triumph, Benvenuti, CCC, Deichmann, Salamander, Tabor, Diversity and Meli Melo.

=== Other shops ===
Other shops present in the shopping center are:

- Beauty and personal care: Cupio, DM Drogerie Markt, Gerovital, Lila Rossa, Melkior, NALA, NoMasVello, Sephora, Yves Rocher
- Children: Noriel
- Sportswear: Decathlon, Decimas
- Pet shop: Animax
- Health: Casada, Farmacia Catena, Farmacia Dr. Max, OPTIblu, Vitamix
- Home & deco: English Home, Fujifilm, Miniso, Morris Alexander, Pepco
- Electronics: Altex, Kitchen Shop
- Telecommunications: Arsis Vodafone, IQ Box, Digi, Orange
- Stationery, press, alcohol, and tobacco: Cărturești, Diverta, Inmedio, Smoke Mania

== Restaurants and coffee shops ==
In Veranda Mall one can find the following restaurants and coffee shops: CARBO Food & Pub, Clătite la topogan, Nedelya, Dodo Pizza, Fornetti, KFC, McDonald's, Mesopotamia, Noodle Pack, Restaurant Rustic, Spotlight, Starbucks, Sushi Terra, Sweet by MarVio, Ted's Coffee Company, Toan's, Trenta Pizza and Xin Yue.

== Attractions ==
Veranda Mall features a Cinemax movie theatre, a VR Cinema, both indoor and outdoor playgrounds, as well as the only outdoor skating rink in Obor, with a surface of 600 m^{2}, open only during the cold season.

=== Cinemax ===
The 12 screen multiplex operated by Cinemax is the first cinema opened in Romania by the Slovaks, and it was inaugurated on December 27, 2019, following a €2 million investment. It has a surface of 2,700 m^{2} and a capacity of 1,078 places, and it is equipped with a state of the art technology such as DOLBY Atmos surround system, laser, and 4k projectors.

The largest hall of the cinema has a capacity of 270 seats, and it also includes special places for disabled people; also, in the two VIP rooms, the moviegoers can order a la carte during the screening from the cinema's restaurant.

At Cinemax Veranda, clients can also find a special hall for children, with soft and colored chairs and a playground. All halls include special seats for couples, consisting of double seats located in the last rows of the movie theatre.

=== The VR Cinema ===
The VR Cinema opened at Veranda Mall in June 2017 was the first in Romania and the second of its kind in Europe, and it followed an investment of €150,000. The VR Cinema offers the public 30-minute projections grouped thematically in four categories: documentaries, comedies, travel, and Sci-Fi.

=== Events and free activities ===
Every year, Veranda Mall hosts thematic events for its clients, such as The Style Academy (Academia de Stil), Marea Ghetăreală, The Great Egg Hunt (Marea Vânătoare de Ouă) and the Veranda Mall Picnic, and many others.

== Facilities and services ==
- Beauty salons: Apollo Beauty Salon, Salon Forfecilă
- Banks and ATMs: Banca BCR, Banca Transilvania, Raiffeisen Bank, bancomat BRD
- Health: Regina Maria - punct de recoltare
- Office of the clerk and recorder: Birou de evidența populației - Biroul Evidență Persoane Sector 2
- Post Office: Poșta Română - Oficiul Poștal 39 - Ghișeul 2, Pachetomat Poșta Panduri
- Exchange: Perfect Exchange
- Dry cleaning: Eco Clean
- Tailor shop: Croitoria Senior Tailor
- Tourism: DERTOUR
- Key multiplications: Chei Silca
- Photography: Fujifilm
- Accreditations: ECDL
- Insurance: RCA Asigurări
- Parking: 1,200 places

== Social projects ==
As a proximity mall, one of Veranda Mall's objectives was to support the local community. At the beginning of 2020, following the general lockdown caused by the COVID-19 pandemic, the shopping mall joined forces with civic initiatives such as Cumpărături la Ușa Ta. Volunteers helped people who couldn't go shopping with food and sanitary products in order to protect the exposed groups and those with walking impairments from contracting the virus.

In 2017, Veranda Mall opened its private parking lot free of charge to the people of the neighborhood, as a result of the weather forecasts which announced a heavy snowstorm.

== Awards ==
In 2020 Veranda Mall won three awards for their local communications campaign, their Instagram account, and the readjustment of their business in the COVID-19 context.

1. European Search Awards - Best Local Campaign (SEO): Vertify.agency & Veranda Mall – Changing the Face of a Mall & Its Neighborhood
2. Webstock Awards: Best Use of Instagram: Second place Lifestyle de Obor – Veranda Mall
3. Retail Updated: The fastest readjustment of the business model
