= Moșilor =

Neighborhood in Bucharest, Romania

Coordinates: 44.442666°N 26.118643°E

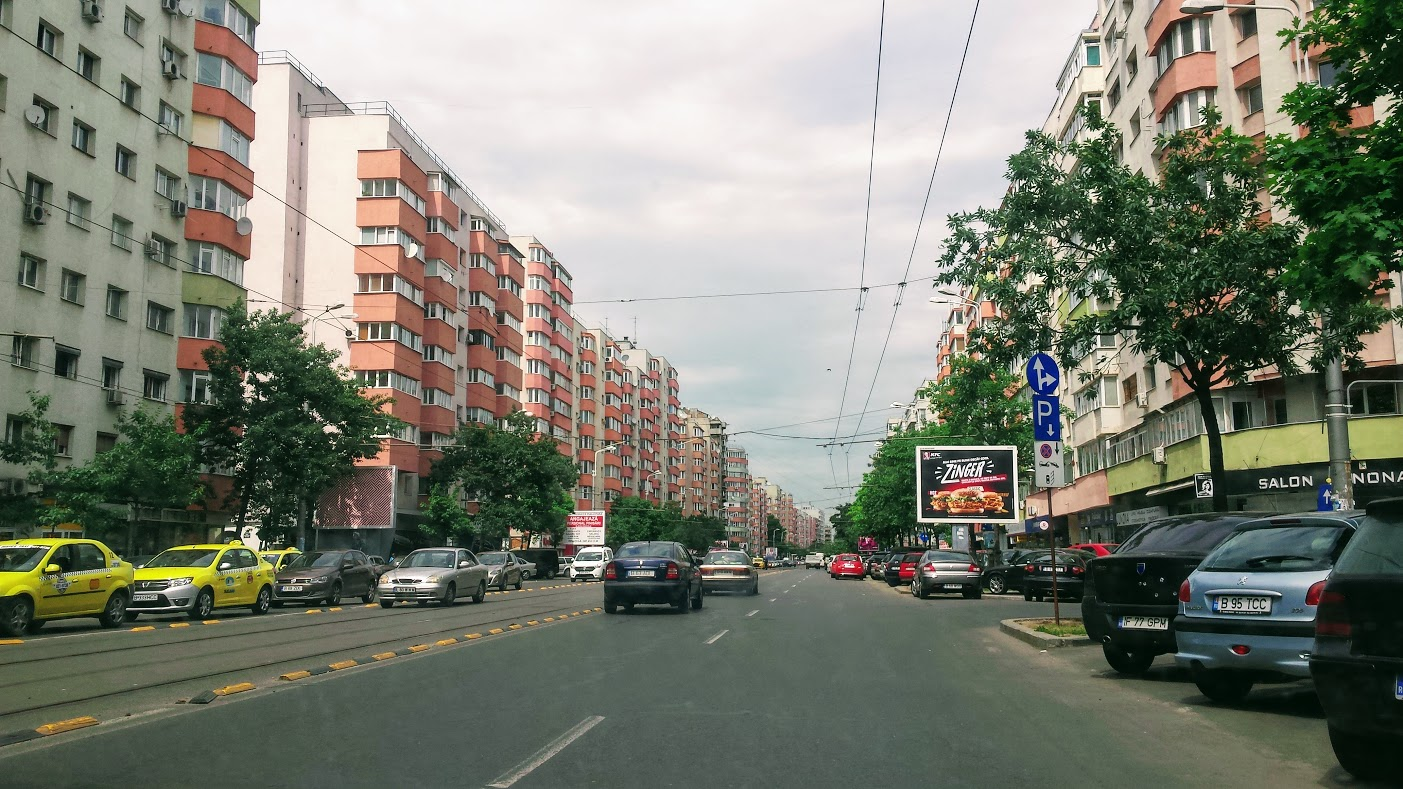
Calea Moșilor between Carol I Boulevard and Obor

Moșilor (literally, Elders) is a residential quarter in Bucharest's Sector 2. It houses the Foișorul de Foc, St. Sylvester's Church, and Olari Church. Its name derives from the main avenue Calea Moșilor which in turn is named after a well-known fair held in Obor square (Târgul Moșilor) from the 18th century up to the 1950s. The Moșilor quarter is serviced by tram lines 14, 16, and 21, and the M1 Line through Obor metro station.
