= Colțea Church =

Heritage site in Bucharest, Romania

Coordinates: 44°26′05″N 26°06′12″E

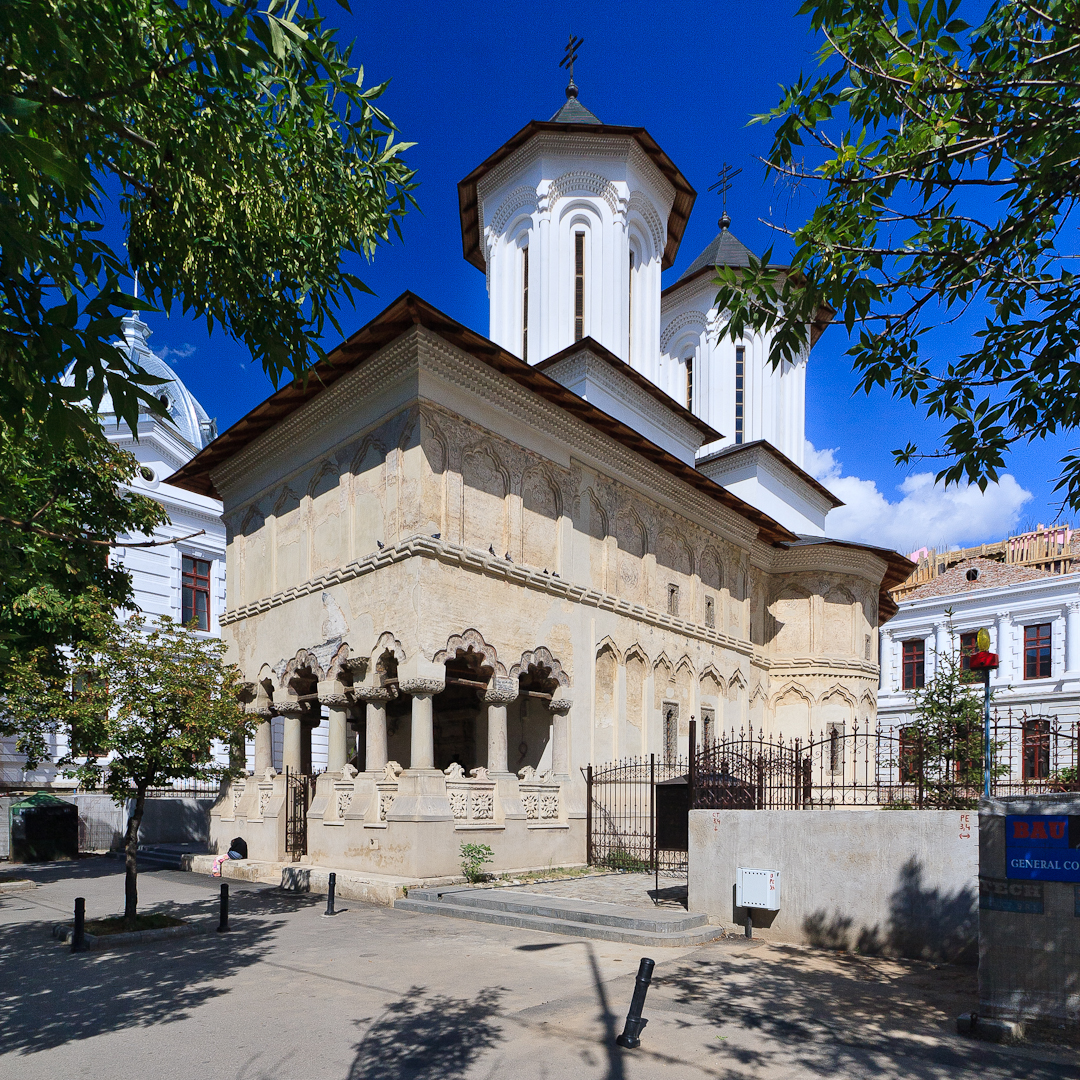
Colțea Church

The Colțea Church (Romanian: Biserica Colțea) is a Romanian Orthodox church located at 1 I. C. Brătianu Boulevard, just off University Square in Bucharest, Romania. It is dedicated to the Three Holy Hierarchs.

== History ==
The church was once at the center of the Colțea Monastery, also called Trisfetitele, a folk name for its patron saints. The complex also included the Colțea Hospital, three chapels, other annexes and, at the entrance, Turnul Colței. A statue of the ktetor, Spătar Mihai Cantacuzino, stands in front of the church and hospital. To the south of the current church, a wooden church and several cells were built by the Sluger Udrea around 1641-1642, and dedicated to Paraskeva of the Balkans. Mentioned in a 1658 document, it was willed to his brother, the High Clucer Colțea Doicescu, who placed it under the authority of the Metropolis of Ungro-Wallachia. By 1669, the church had given its name to the surrounding district. With the approval of Colțea‘s descendants and the Metropolitan, Cantacuzino purchased the land and built the present stone church between 1695 and 1698. The surrounding houses, which hosted a school, dated to 1696, with the hospital completed in 1707. He granted estates and tax breaks to the church.

The chapels do not survive; one, located to the north, near the abbot’s residence, was dedicated to Paraskeva; another, to the west, among the hospital buildings, was dedicated to Saints Cosmas and Damian; the third, to the east, was dedicated to All Saints, built for schoolboys by Vornic Șerban Cantacuzino. A fire affected the complex in 1739, damaging both roofs and interiors; the buildings were repaired the same year. The area was surrounded by walls, completed in 1714-1715 under Ștefan Cantacuzino. Turnul Colței, raised around the same time, was located in a nearly straight line from the church, about 20 meters west; entry to the courtyard was beneath its portal. Serving as a bell tower with a clock, as well as a fire tower, it was gravely damaged by earthquakes during the 19th century and demolished in 1888 during a street widening.

The church was mentioned as early as 1702. In 1770, logothete Necula Mănescu added a second portico, according to that year’s pisanie; it was placed in front of the large extant one. The addition was removed in 1888; a trace of the connecting structure can be seen above the arches of the remaining portico. After the 1838 earthquake, repairs followed in 1841. The interior was painted by Gheorghe Tattarescu in 1871. Painted panels alternate with motifs and imitation-marble decorations. The donor portrait on the western wall of the narthex depicts Mihai Cantacuzino and his wife Maria. Repairs carried out in 1895 involved removing the exterior plaster, beneath which were discovered red and black frescoes covering the church, attributed to Pârvu Mutu. Following the 1944 bombardment, the church was consolidated in 1949. The bell tower above the narthex was reconstituted in 1950–1955. Further restoration began in 1996. Between 2001 and 2005, the church underwent extensive consolidation, volumetric remodeling, and restoration works, based on an architectural project by architect Constanța Carp and a resistance project by engineer Laurențiu-Tudor Spoială; the interior painting was restored by Gheorghe Nicolae-Jack.

== Description ==
A typical Brâncovenesc building, the cross-shaped church has a slightly enlarged narthex and walls over a meter thick; it measures 27.5 meters long by 8.5–11.5 meters wide. A dome originally existed above the nave, as demonstrated by the network of double vaults, and this was rebuilt after 2000. Nave and narthex are divided by three central arches resting on columns that have twisted fluting, Corinthian capitals, carved bases and high pedestals. The iconostasis is richly decorated with plant and geometric motifs, two rows of icons and one of medallions. The choir chairs are artistically carved. There are four old icons: Madonna and Child (1786), the Three Holy Hierarchs, Ss. Cosmas and Damian (the latter attributed to Pârvu Mutu) and St. Paraskeva (18th century, painted on wood and silvered, Russian school).

The large, well-proportioned open portico features five frontal arches and two on each side. All have many-lobed archivolts, resting on ten cylindrical stone columns. Their capitals are carved with floral and animal motifs, they rest on high pedestals between floral balustrades; in turn, the ensemble sits on a massive base. Traces of the 18th-century frescoes believed to be by Pârvu Mutu survive in the portico, but were altered by a flawed restoration. The facades employ decorative architectural elements that were new for their time. There are two levels of frames with many-lobed arches, separated by a string course shaped like a twisted rope. The upper window frames are of three-lobed stone, carved with floral motifs; the lower ones each have an angel head with extended wings.

The portal combines Italian baroque with Ottoman and local elements. The upper part of the doorway ends in a three-lobed arch, while the sides have Corinthian columns. Above, an Italianate entablature has two winged griffins carved in relief around the frieze. The empty plate between them probably once held the pisanie, thought to have been erased by the Ottomans after his killing. Above this space there is a double-headed eagle, symbol of the Cantacuzino family. The column pedestals are decorated with images of the Four Evangelists.

The church was closed by the communist regime between 1986 and 1989. It served as a place of refuge during the Romanian Revolution; the parish priest rang its bells on the night of 21-22 December, both in joy and as a warning of danger. A memorial cross was placed close by in memory of those killed on the spot. The church is listed as a historic monument by Romania's Ministry of Culture and Religious Affairs.
