= St. Sylvester's Church =

Heritage site in Bucharest, Romania

Coordinates: 44°26′35″N 26°06′55″E

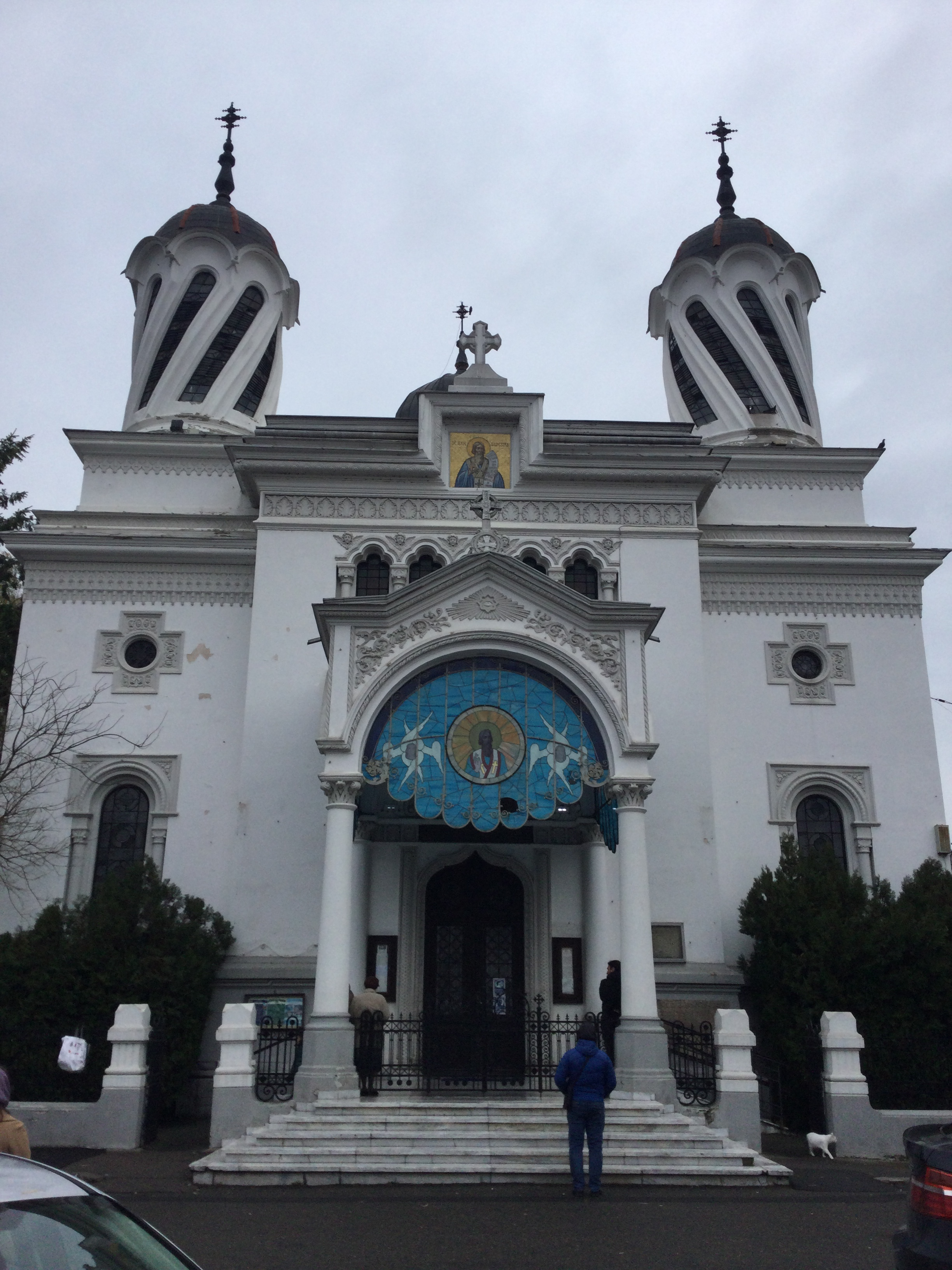
St. Sylvester's Church

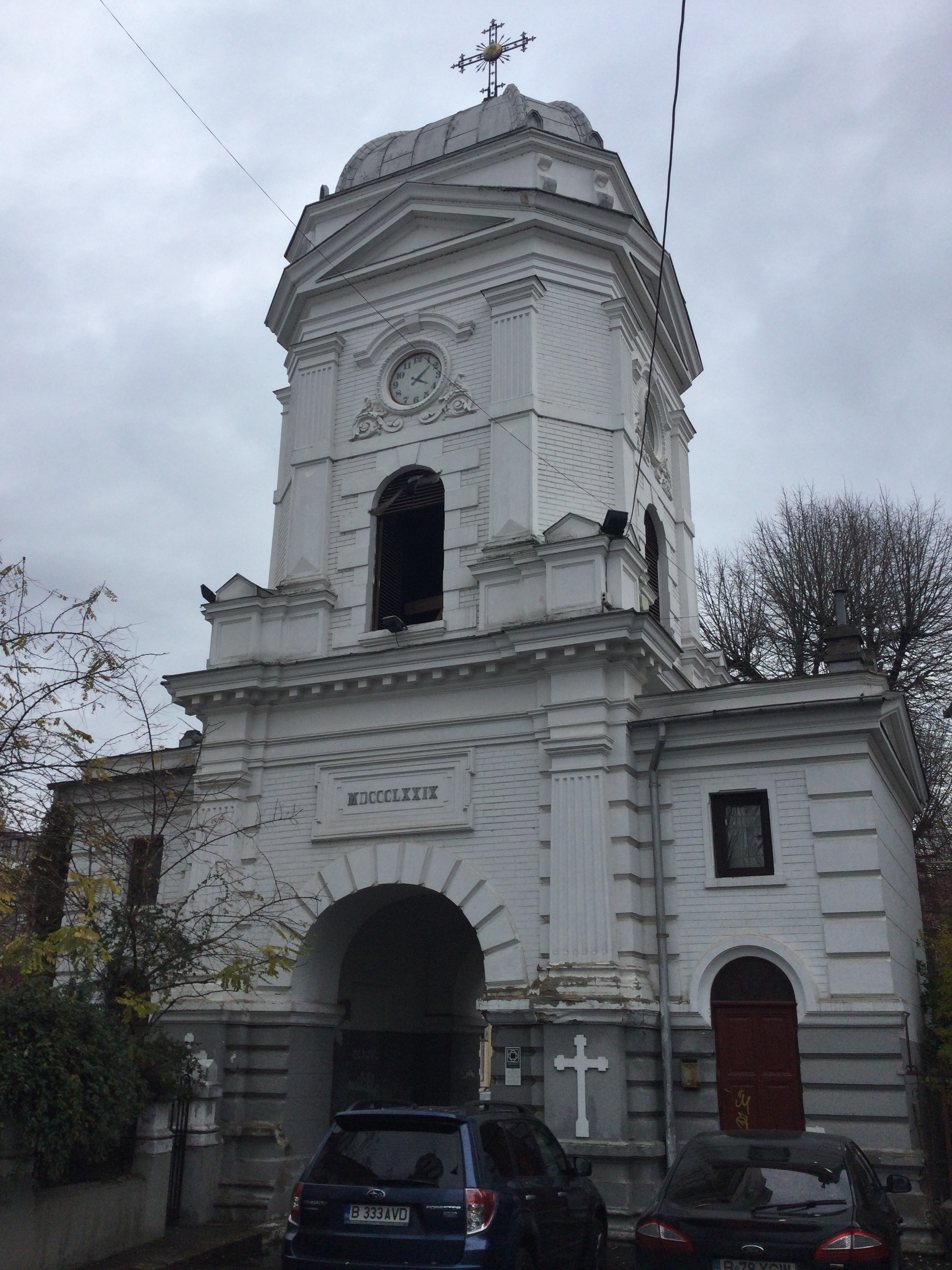
Bell tower

St. Sylvester's Church (Romanian: Biserica Sfântul Silvestru) is a Romanian Orthodox church located at 36 Silvestru Street in the Moșilor quarter of Bucharest, Romania. It is dedicated to the Dormition of the Mother of God and to Saint Pope Sylvester I.

A first church was built on the site before 1743, the date of the pisanie. The ktetors were Župan Pârvu the textile painter and his wife Stanca; it was dedicated to Radu Vodă Monastery. A stone dated 1760 and fixed into the wall of a nearby house mentions the donations made to the church by Stanca. After the 1802 earthquake, the church was repaired by her granddaughter, also called Stanca. It collapsed during the 1838 tremor, and was rebuilt by the following year. The 1839 iconostasis was repaired and gilt in 1930–1935. The detached bell tower, beneath which one passes to Oltarului Street, dates to 1879. The church acquired its current form during the rebuilding and enlargement of 1904–1907. Dimitrie Maimarolu was the architect, while Costin Petrescu painted the interior. The dedication to Saint Sylvester was added in 1925.

Measuring 30 meters long by 13.5 meters wide, the imposing church is distinguished by the two spires above the narthex. Their twisted windows recall the Curtea de Argeș Cathedral. A large dome rises above the nave. All three domes have vaulted roofs. The portico resembles a large open baldachin; its columns have Corinthian capitals. The nave has semi-circular apses, suggested on the exterior by a slight bulge. The church sits on a high stone base, and features a finely ornamented facade. Above the portico, there is a row of five windows behind small arches and columns. The nave windows have stained glass without figures, while the facade ones feature icons of saints. The interior has two rows of painted columns decorated with floral motifs and gilt capitals. The two stoves of enameled tile are decorated with religious subjects.

In 2002, Patriarch Teoctist brought back relics of the patron saint from the Vatican, giving them as a gift to the parish. The church is listed as a historic monument by Romania's Ministry of Culture and Religious Affairs. Also listed is the bell tower. Constantin Galeriu, who served as parish priest from 1975, is buried on the grounds.
