= Turnul Colței =

Colței Tower
- Turnul Colței
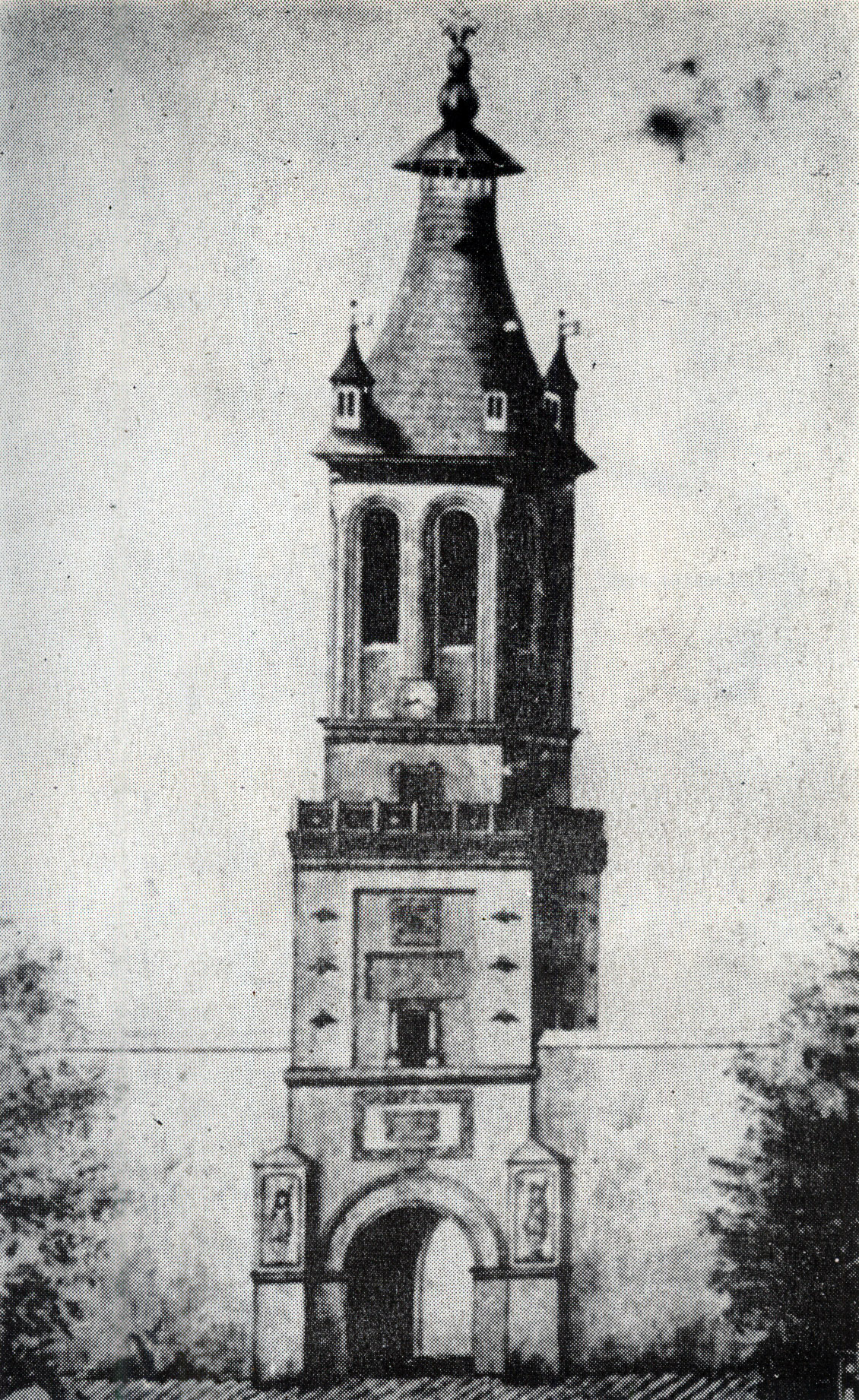
- Turnul Colței, before 1802

General information
- Status: Demolished
- Location: Under the I.C. Bratianu Boulevard and in the yard of the Colțea Hospital, Bucharest, Romania
- Coordinates: 44°26′6.54″N 26°6′10.72″E
- Completed: 1714
- Demolished: 1888

Height
- Height: 54 metres (177 feet)

Technical details
- Floor area: 100 square metres (1,100 square feet)

Turnul Colței (also Turnul Colțea or Colții) was a tower located in Bucharest, Wallachia, now in Romania. Its initial purpose was to be used as a bell tower — its 1,700 kg (3,700 lb) bell, was moved to the Sinaia Monastery after the tower was demolished. It was also meant to serve as a watch tower.

The tower was named after Vornic Colțea Doicescu. His brother, Udrea Doicesu, built a small wooden church on the plot near the tower; after he was assassinated, the church and the land next to it were inherited by Colțea, who donated them to the Orthodox Metropolis of Ungro-Wallachia. The Church sold the patch of land near the church to Spătar Mihai Cantacuzino, who, in 1701, used it as the location for the first hospital in Wallachia, the Colțea Hospital, and also decided to build a tower.

== Description ==
The tower was the highest building in the city for more than a century. Based on the drawings done by sluger N. Oteteleșanu, it was estimated that the tower had a height of 54 metres (177 feet). During the archeological digs carried out in 1970, it was determined that the tower had a surface area of 100 square metres (1,100 square feet), and was located 20 metres (66 feet) away from the church. It was discovered that the foundations were made of stone, using river boulders, stuck in a mortar made of limestone, gravel with small pieces of coal and fragments of bricks. From the limestone level, the tower was raised only of brick.

The lower part of the tower was reminiscent of the local style of fortified monasteries, while the upper part was more of German or Swedish architecture. The roof, made in the baroque style, presented four turrets, and finished with raised eaves. Above the entrance was a rectangular stone, decorated with floral elements, which inscribed two quadrilateral surfaces, one of which had heraldic insignia. The first floor was separated from the next by a brick belt. The western façade of the second floor was dominated by a beam and the pisanie supported on two adjacent columns framing a window. The shorter third floor had a closed balcony with a balustrade, made of stone parapets on the surfaces of which three motifs alternated: the Cantacuzine eagle, a floral ornament, and another with a vase of flowers. The balustrade was supported on corbels, finished with lion heads carved in stone. The clock was mounted on one side. On top of the roof there were two bulbous domes with a cross above the last. Two Swedish soldiers, an infantryman and a cavalryman, holding their carbines on the shoulder were painted on each side of the entrance. A now lost inscription in memory of the Swedish soldiers who worked as masons on the tower also existed.

== History ==
The tower was built between 1709 and 1714, its construction being assisted by the Swedish soldiers of the army of King Charles XII, who had fled to Wallachia after the disastrous defeat at the Battle of Poltava. This is also confirmed by Franz Josef Sulzer, who wrote in 1787 that the soldiers who worked on the tower were hosted by Constantin Brâncoveanu following the battle of Poltava. The name of the tower also reminds of Colonel Sandu Colțea, who was the commander of a Wallachian Regiment (Vallackregementet). Mihai Cantacuzino kept his secret archive inside the tower.

It survived a fire in 1739. An earthquake on 14 October 1802 of magnitude 7.7 to 7.9 destroyed the top part of the tower, including its clock. Following the earthquake, the upper floors were rebuilt from wood and it served for a while as a watchtower. It was further damaged in the 1829 and 1838 earthquakes. In 1888, it was demolished completely. Two years later, in 1890, another structure was built as a watch tower, Foișorul de Foc.

== Gallery ==
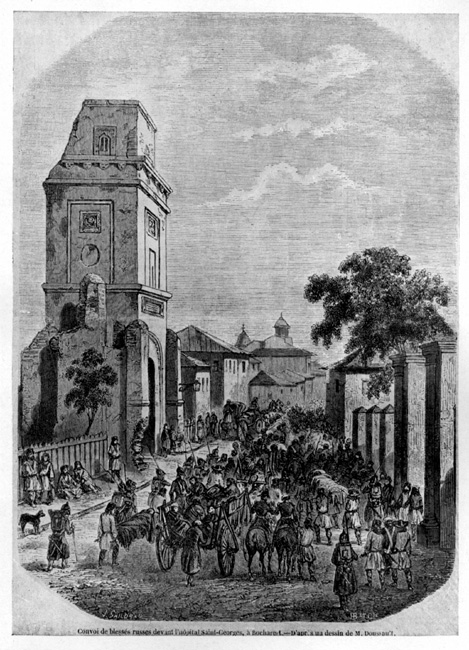
Mid-19th century

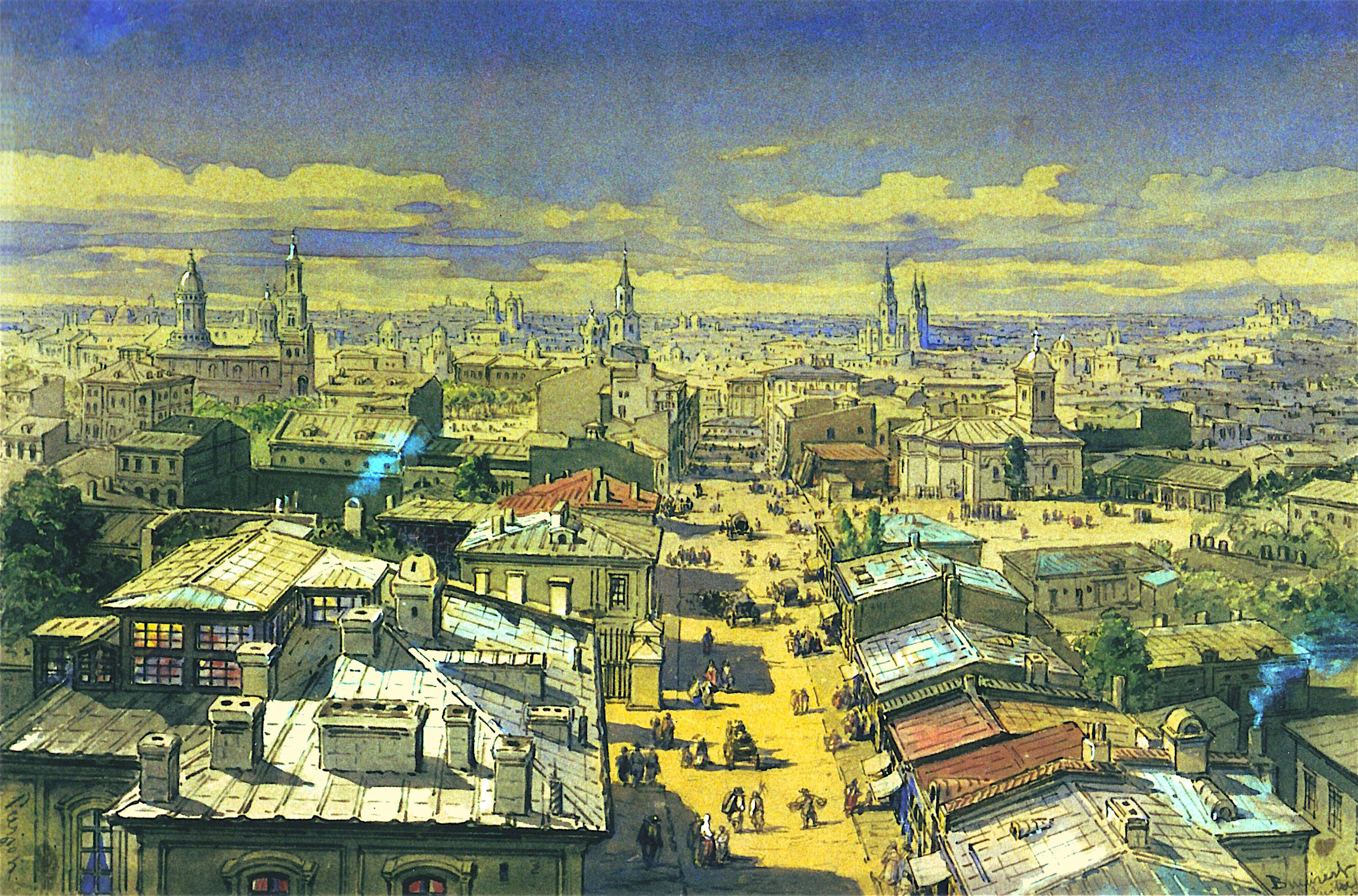
Bucharest, as seen from the top of Turnul Colței (1868 watercolour by Amadeo Preziosi)

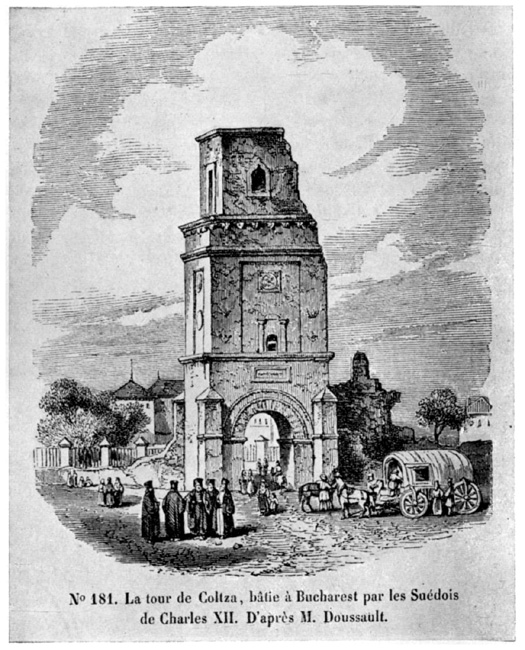
1841

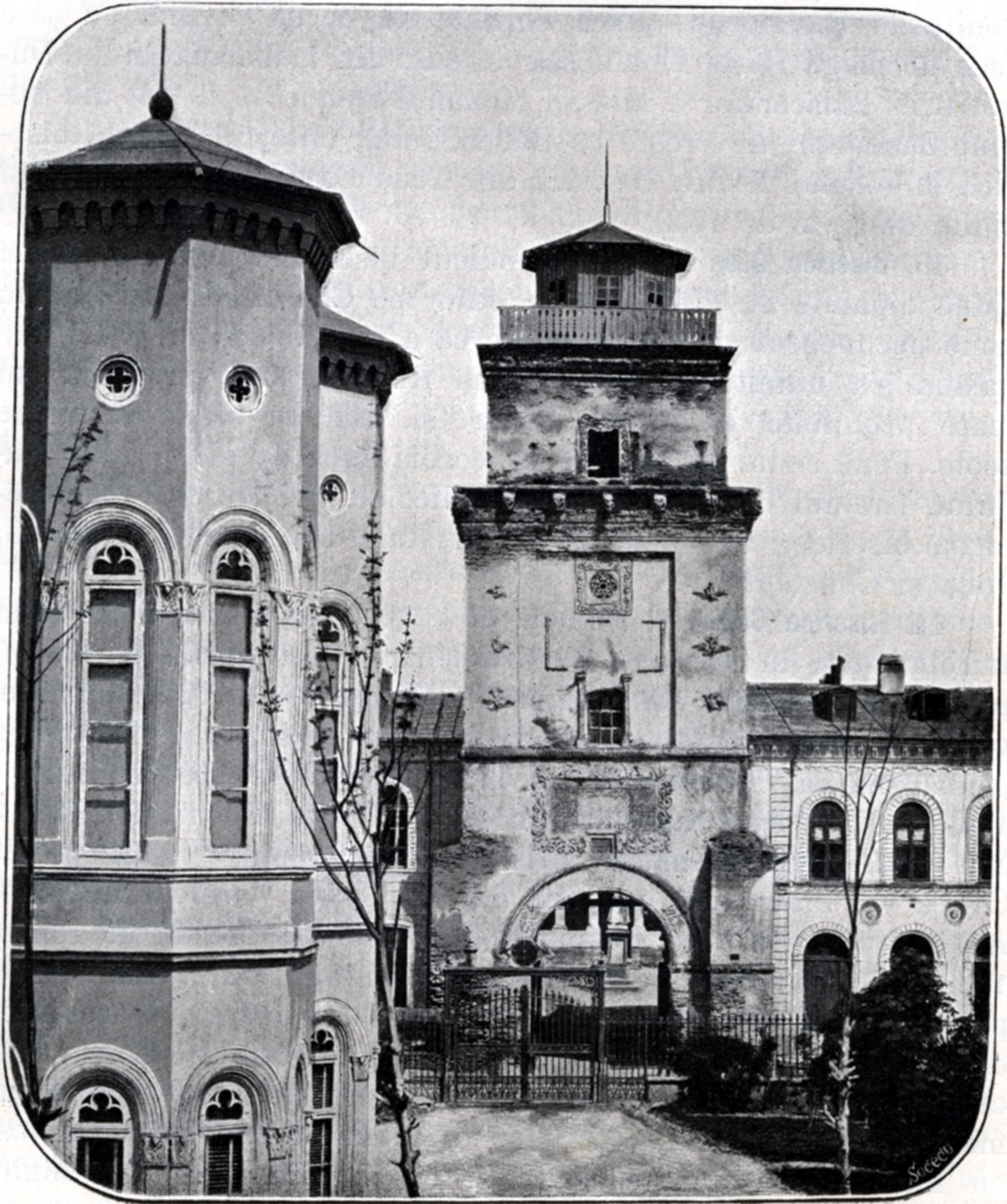
1870 photograph by Carol Szathmari

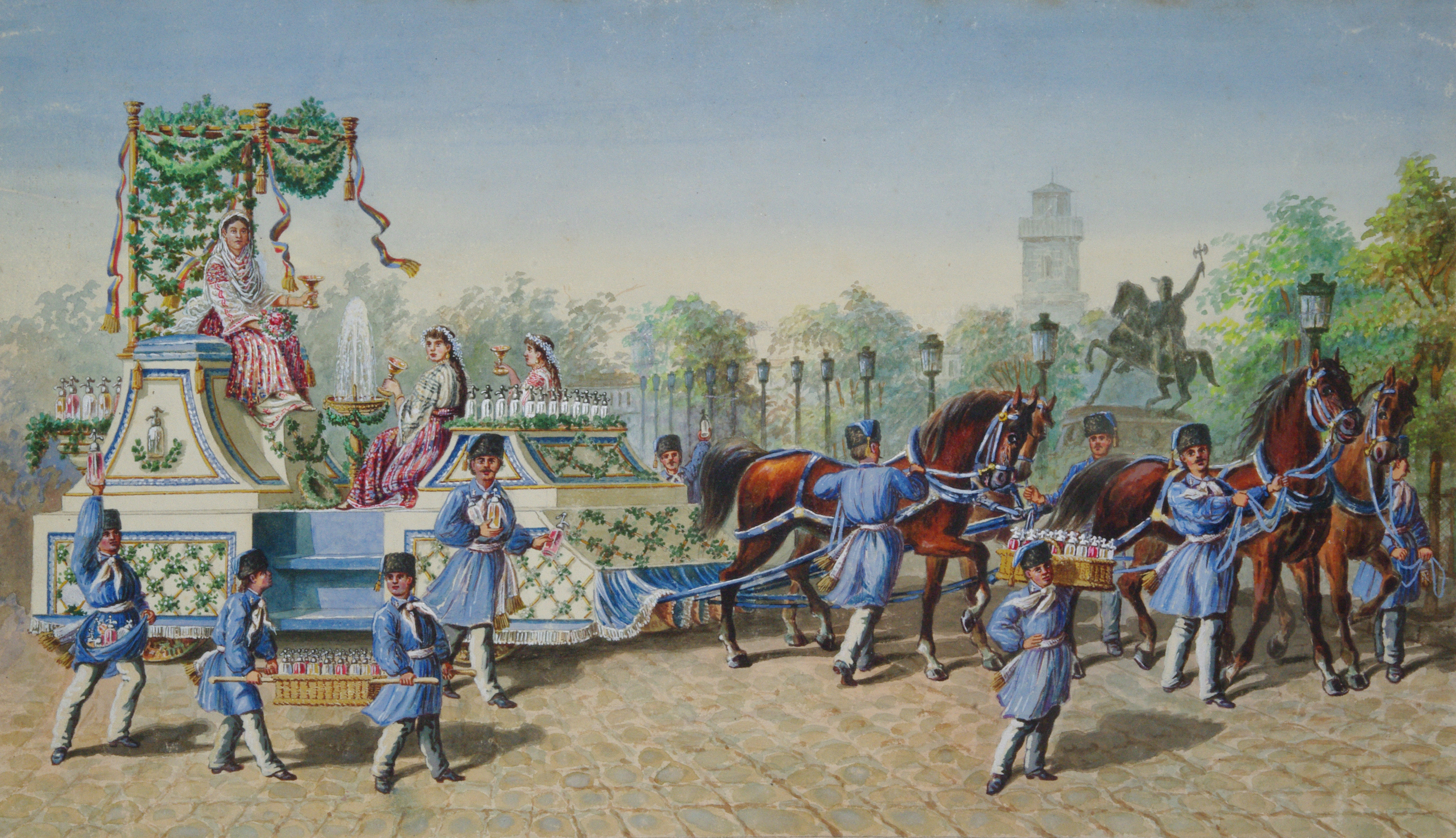
1881 lithograph by Szathmari

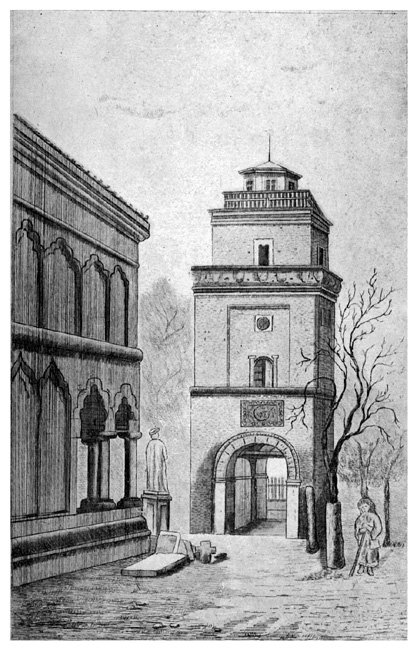
1888 drawing

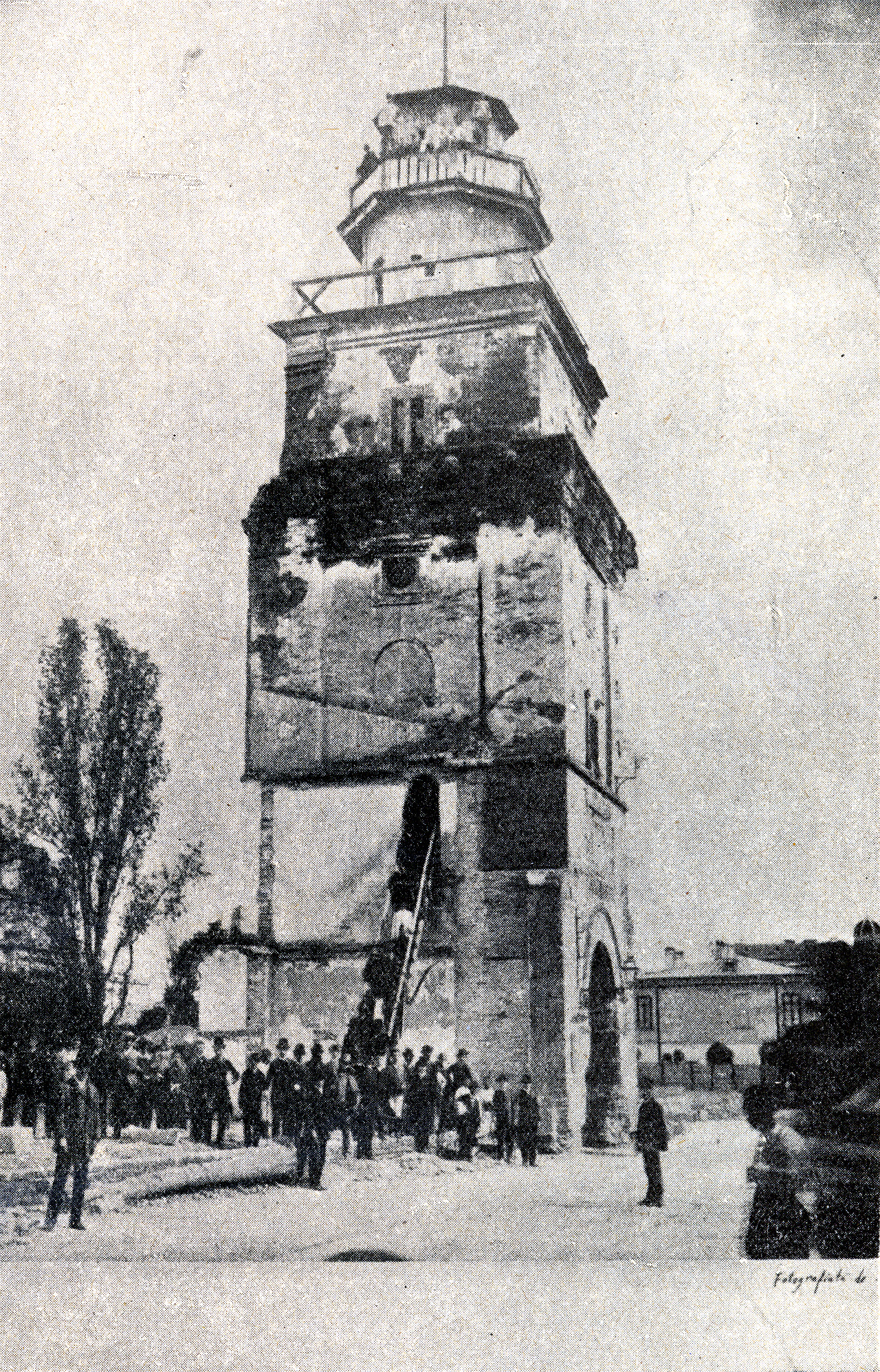
1888 photograph

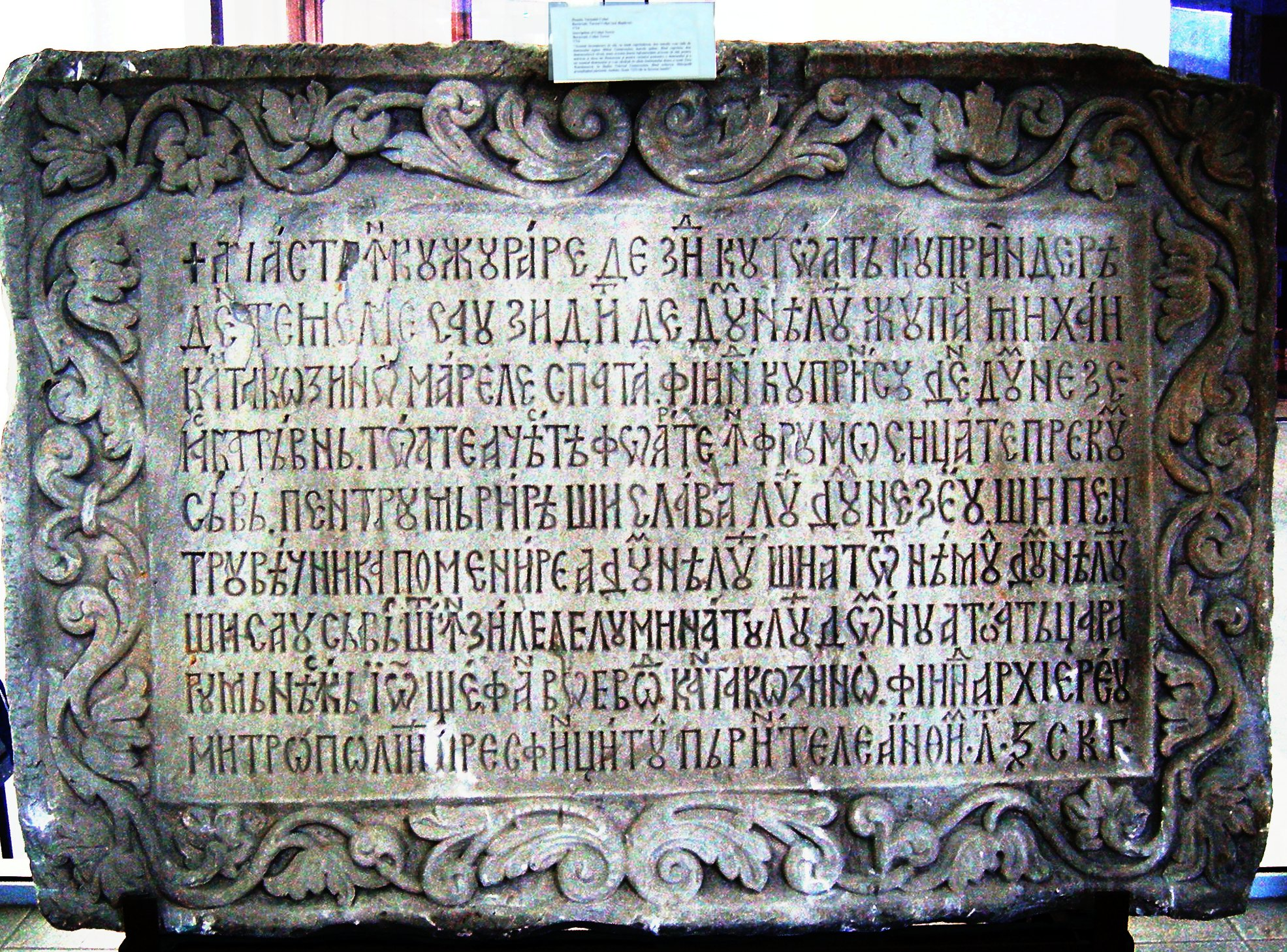
Inscribed stone from the tower, Museum of Romanian History, Bucharest

== See also ==
- Colțea Monastery
