= Foișorul de Foc =

Historic building Bucharest, Romania

Coordinates: 44°26′25.20″N 26°7′14.12″E

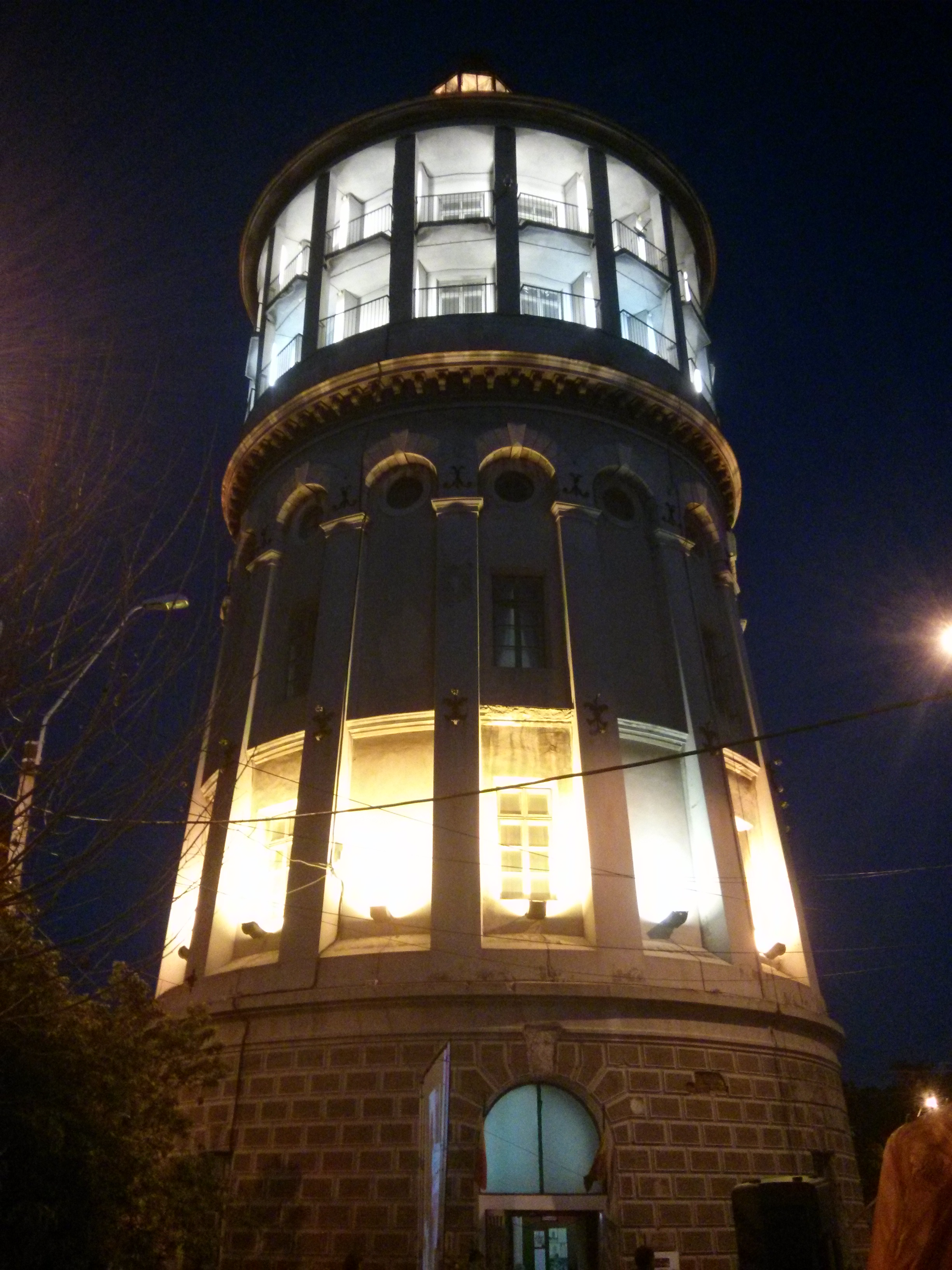
Foișorul de Foc during the Night of Museums, 2014

Foișorul de Foc (literally The Fire Tower) is a 42 metres (138 feet) high building in Bucharest, Romania, between Obor, Calea Moșilor, and Nerva-Traian. It was used in the past as an observation tower by the firemen.

In September 2024, the museum was reopened, the building having undergone restoration, starting from 2021.

== Background ==
It was built in 1890, two years after the previous watchtower, Turnul Colței, built in 1715, was demolished. The plans were made by George Mandrea, back then the chief-architect of Bucharest.

Foișorul de Foc had a double role, as it was also designed to be a water tower, too. However, after the building was finished, the local water utility company (Uzina de Apă Grozăvești) had no pumps powerful enough to fill it with water.

Foișorul de Foc was used by the firefighters until 1935, when it became ineffective, as more and more high-rise buildings were built in Bucharest, and the introduction of the telephone reduced the need for a watchtower. In 1963, it was turned into a Firefighters' Museum.

== Gallery ==
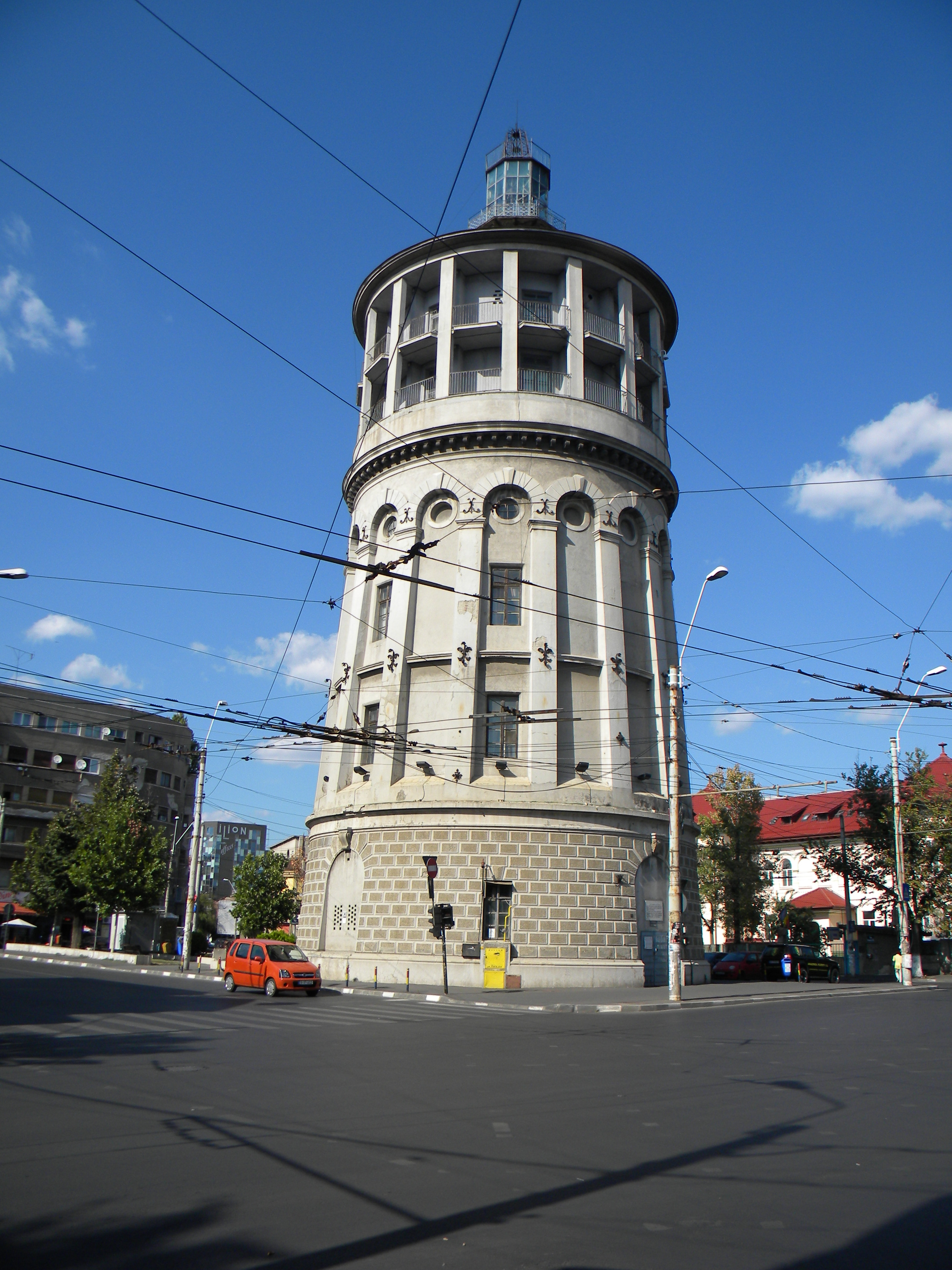
Daytime view

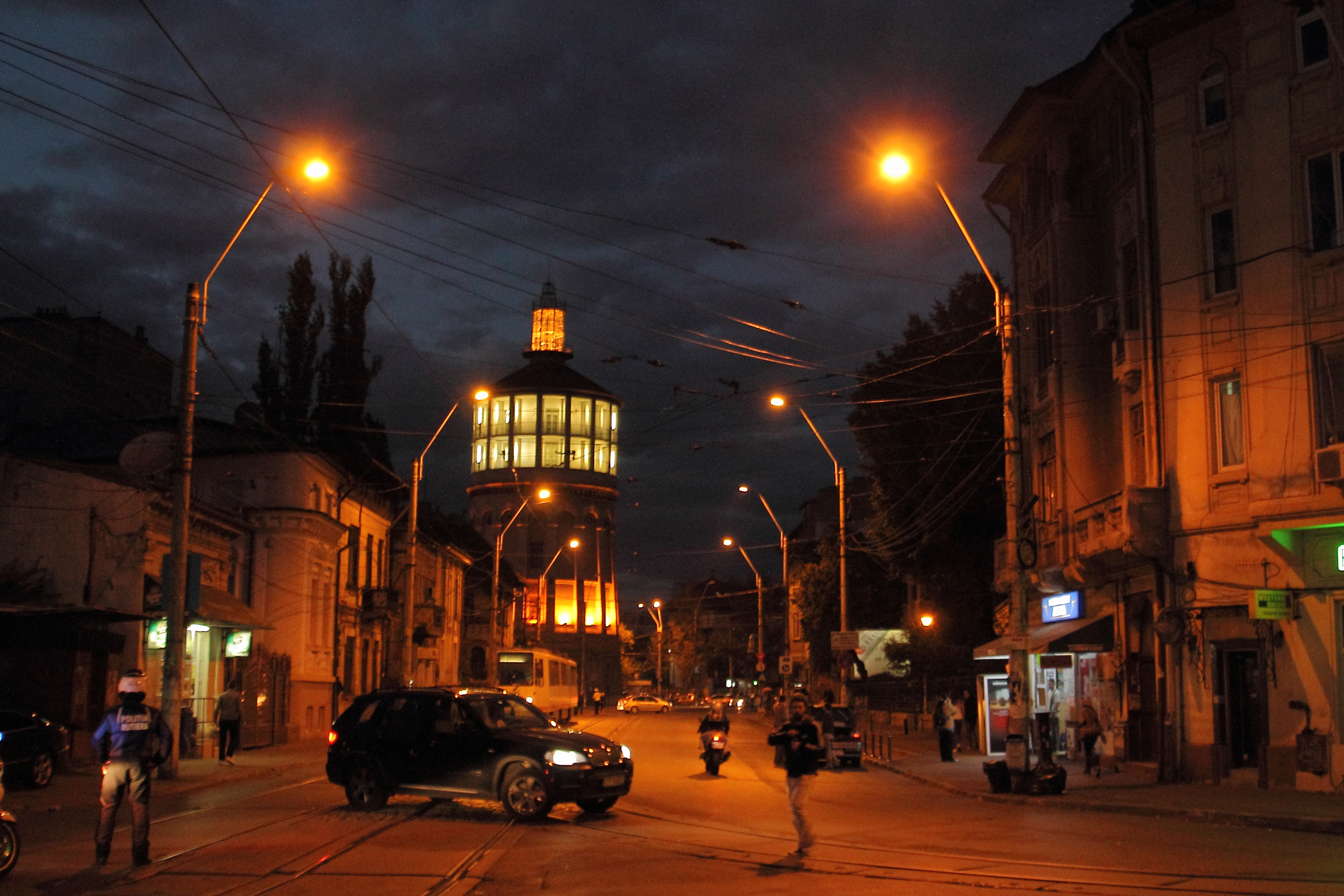
Night view
