= Church with the Saints =

Orthodox church in Bucharest, Romania

Coordinates: 44.4354°N 26.1085°E

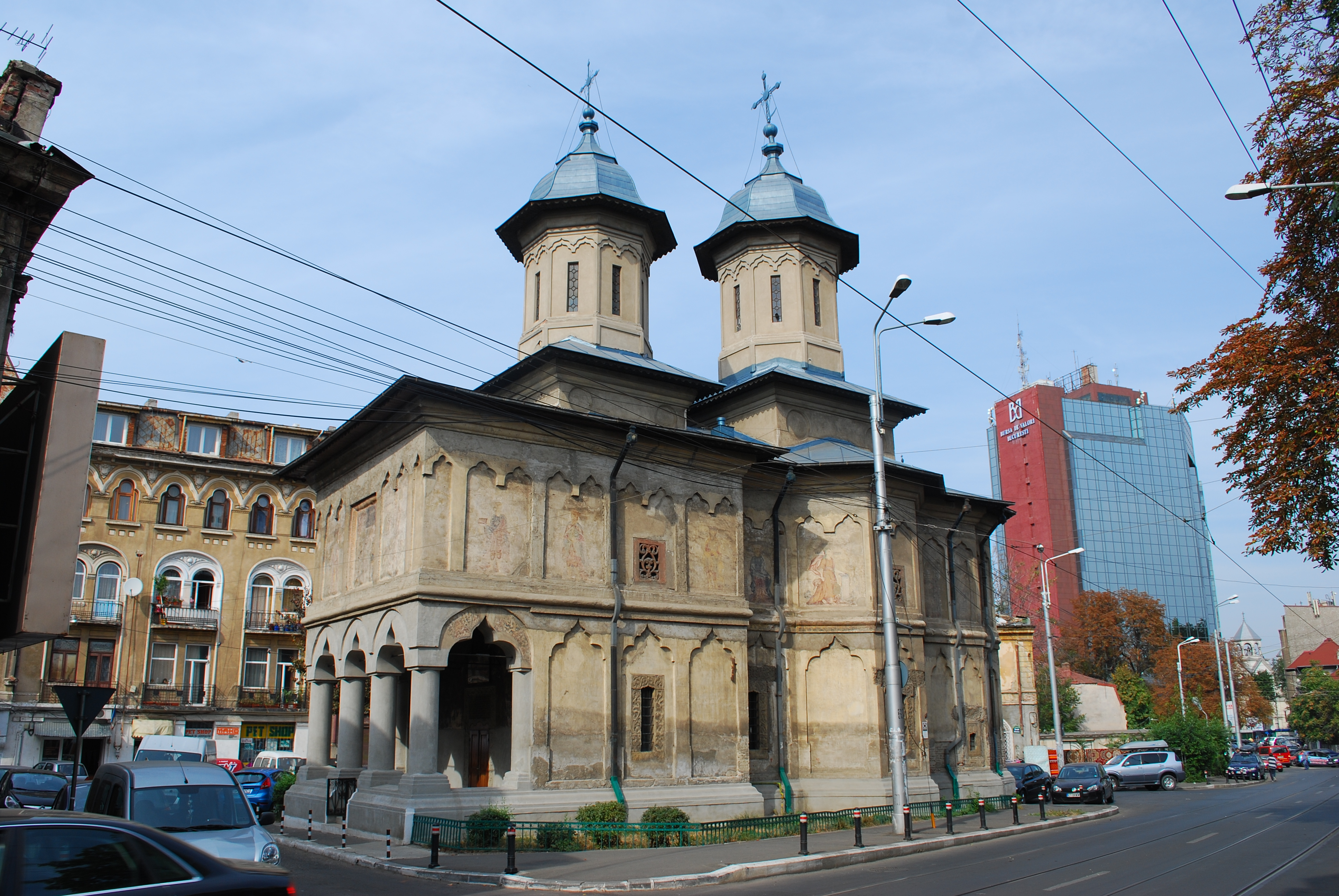
Church with the Saints

The Church with the Saints (Romanian: Biserica cu Sfinți), also the Church with the Sibyls (Biserica cu Sibile), is a Romanian Orthodox church located at 79 Calea Moșilor in Bucharest, Romania. It is dedicated to the Presentation of Mary.

Situated at what was once the edge of the city, the church stands on the site of an earlier one. Probably made of wood, this structure dated to the late 17th century and was established by Popa (priest) Hierea Băjescul, whose name (as “Fierea”) was later used to designate the church and its surroundings; he donated it to the Metropolis of Ungro-Wallachia. The nickname involving sibyls arose as these were painted on the exterior; in the 19th century, saints were added as a designation, for similar reasons.

The present church was built under Metropolitan Daniil II; according to the pisanie, the interior was painted and the structure was finished in 1728. Tradition holds that Prince Nicholas Mavrocordatos, riding through the area with Daniil some two years previous, saw the ruined wooden church and proposed its rebuilding. Repaired in 1819, it was severely damaged by the 1838 earthquake. As part of the repairs, a dome was demolished in 1845 and replaced by a wooden one. The Metropolis stopped upkeep after 1860; the church, in ruins and threatened with demolition, was closed. The present sibyls and prophets on the exterior date to an 1897 renovation. The church was repaired in 1912 and restored in 1931.

The cross-shaped church is 21.7 meters long and 7.7 to 8.7 meters wide, reaching 9.3 meters high at the pediment and 19 at the high dome. The portico was added later and is as wide as the narthex. It has three frontal arches and one on each side, inscribed in semicircular vaults. These rest on massive stone columns with simple capitals and bases. The bell tower sits atop the narthex, which has a vaulted ceiling. The arches with columns separate the narthex from the nave, above which rests the Christ Pantocrator dome. Both domes, rebuilt later, have square bases, octagonal sides and bell-shaped roofs. The narrow windows on the lower part of the facade feature ornamental frames.

The most special feature of the church is the exterior painting, much deteriorated with time. This is found on the upper and lower sections of the facade, separated by a slightly profiled string course. The upper part has pairs of paintings showing ancient philosophers and prophetesses (or sibyls), in red, ochre, black and white. There are nine philosophers and ten sibyls, including, on the north wall, Thucydides and Plato (with crowned head and a scroll in his right hand); on the north and south nave walls, the sibyls Erythraea, Cumaea, Phrygia, Sardica, Cimmeria, Heles, Delphica and Persica, each holding a textual scroll. The south wall depicts Thales (with a book in the right hand and a scroll in the left), Ermis, Aristotle and the Stoics. An icon of the Presentation is painted on the western facade, above the portico; Saints Charalambos and Nicholas are on the sides. Several saints’ icons surround the entrance, as well as images depicting the ktetors.
