= Oborul Vechi Church =

Heritage site in Bucharest, Romania

Coordinates: 44°26′21″N 26°07′14″E

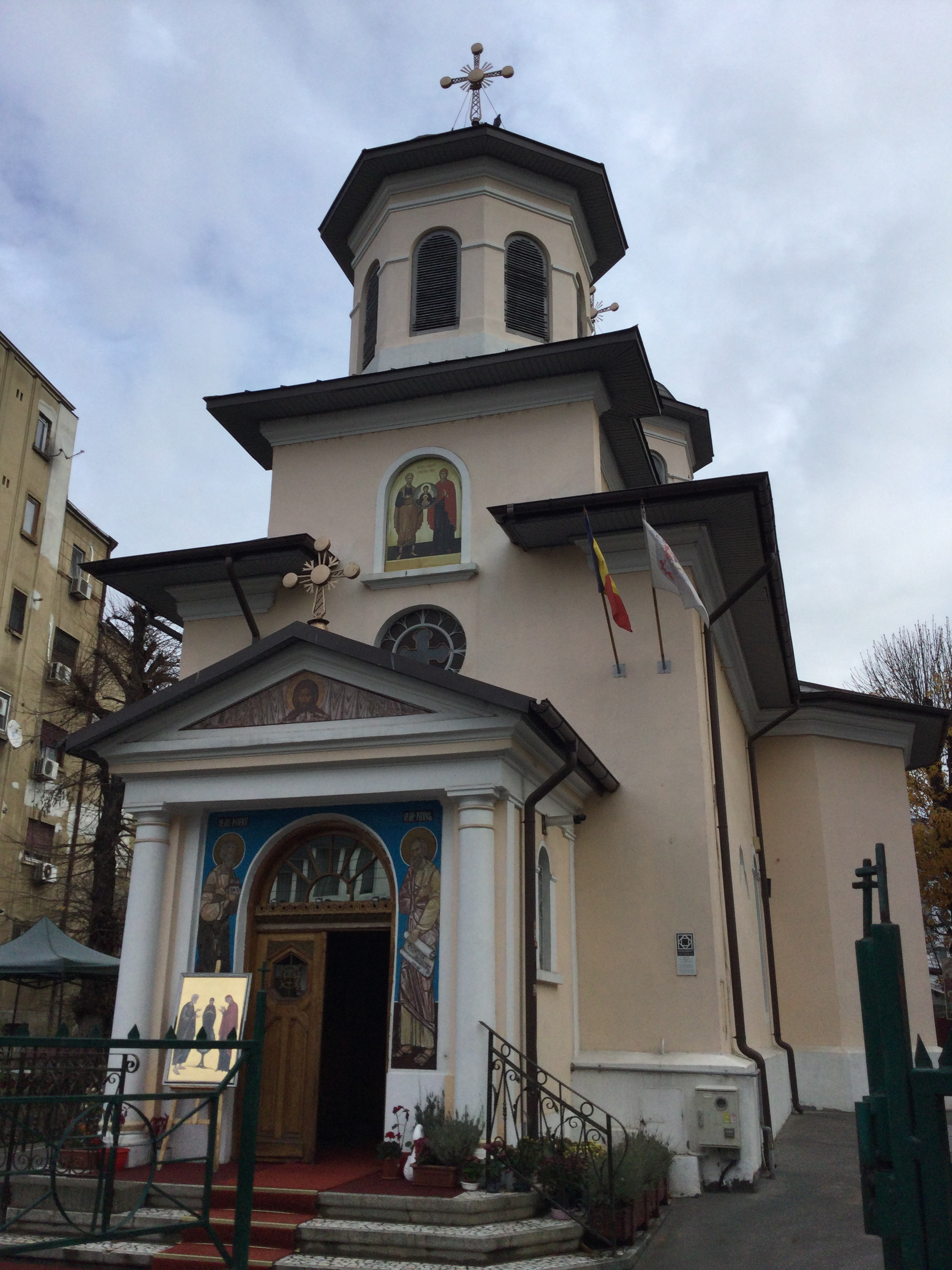
Oborul Vechi Church

Oborul Vechi Church (Romanian: Biserica Oborul Vechi) is a Romanian Orthodox church located at 204 Traian Street in Bucharest, Romania. It is dedicated to Saints Joachim and Anna.

After the plague that affected Bucharest in 1718–1719, the Serdar Matei Mogoș raised a monumental stone cross some four meters high. It was placed at what was then the edge of the city, near the cattle and grain market (oborul vechi means “the old cattle yard”). In 1768, Metropolitan Grigorie ordered the construction of a small church without apses to shelter the cross inside the altar.

Becoming cramped by the early 19th century, the parishioners walled in the old portico, turning it into a narthex, and added side apses. It suffered damage during the 1838 earthquake and was repaired in 1850. A 1938 restoration brought about the current form, including the addition of a small portico with a triangular facade. Additional repairs followed the earthquakes of 1940 and 1977.

The cross-shaped church measures 20 meters long by 6.3 to 12 meters wide, with polygonal side apses. The rectangular altar is spacious and high, in order to fit the stone cross, which can be glimpsed through the royal doors. The two octagonal domes sit on square bases atop the nave and narthex; they and the roof are covered in tin. Light enters the balcony through a small round window above the vestibule, above which an icon of the patron saints is placed in a niche. The columns that separated nave from narthex are gone, while traces of the old arched portico remain on the walls. The interior windows are of stained glass and depict saints.

The church is listed as a historic monument by Romania's Ministry of Culture and Religious Affairs.
