= Sluger =

Sluger (plural slugeri; Romanian pronunciation: [ˈslud͡ʒer], [sluˈd͡ʒer]; sometimes also sulger [ˈsuld͡ʒer]) was a historical rank traditionally held by boyars in Moldavia and Wallachia, roughly corresponding to a sort of Intendant or Master of the Larder. It originated in the Slavic služar.

Slugeri were in charge of supplying the courts of Moldavian or Wallachian Princes with meat mainly beef. They were also in charge of distributing meat to the court households.
