= Obor =

Square and the surrounding district of Bucharest, the capital of Romania

Coordinates: 44°27′1.52″N 26°7′47.03″E

Obor area on the map of Bucharest

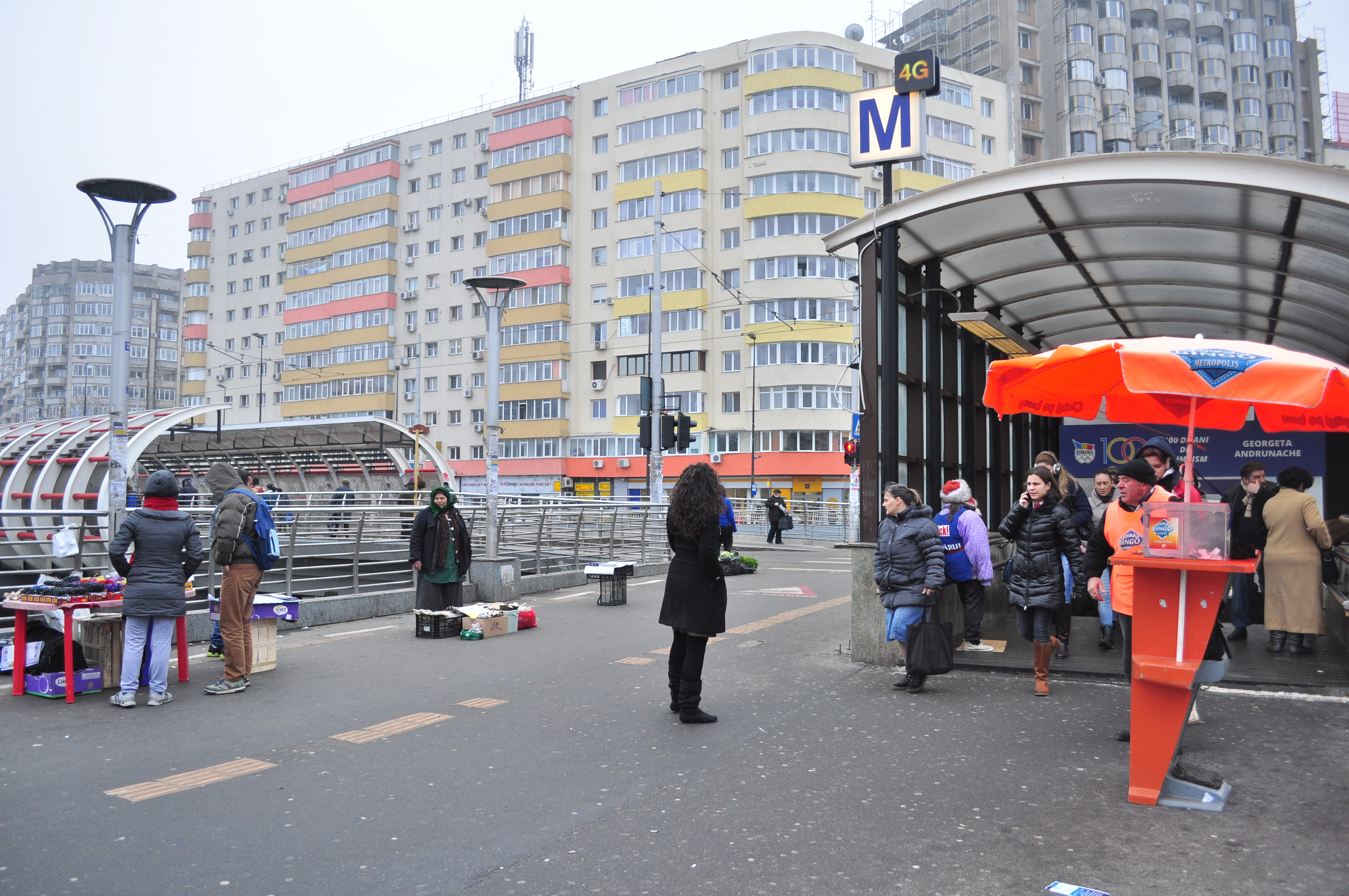
Obor Metro Station

New market in Obor

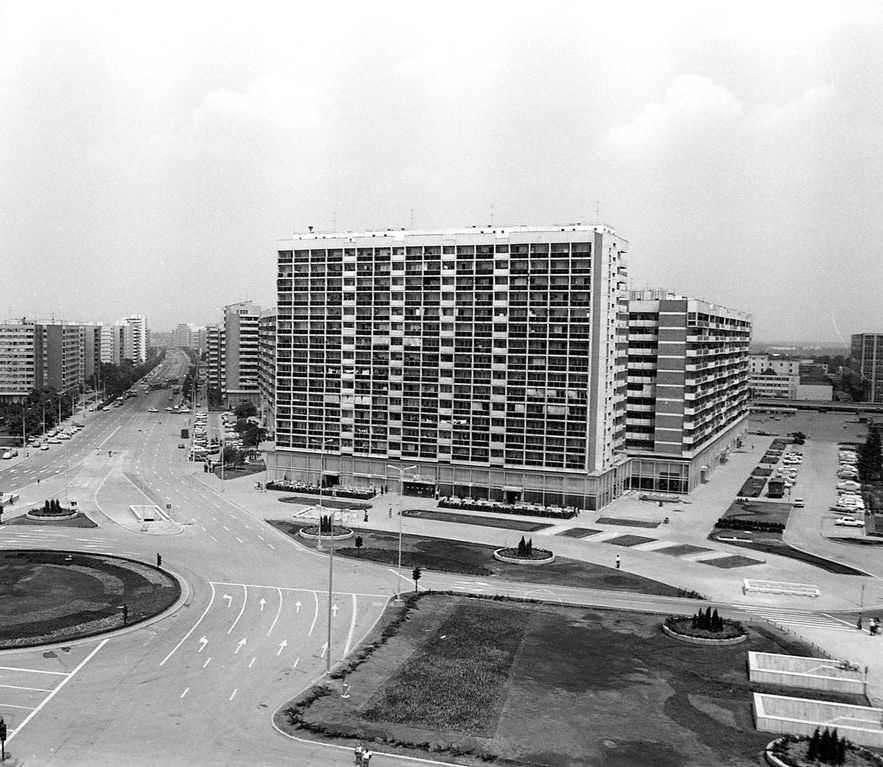
ALMO housing estate, main building and the Bucur Obor commercial complex, in June 1979, right after they were built

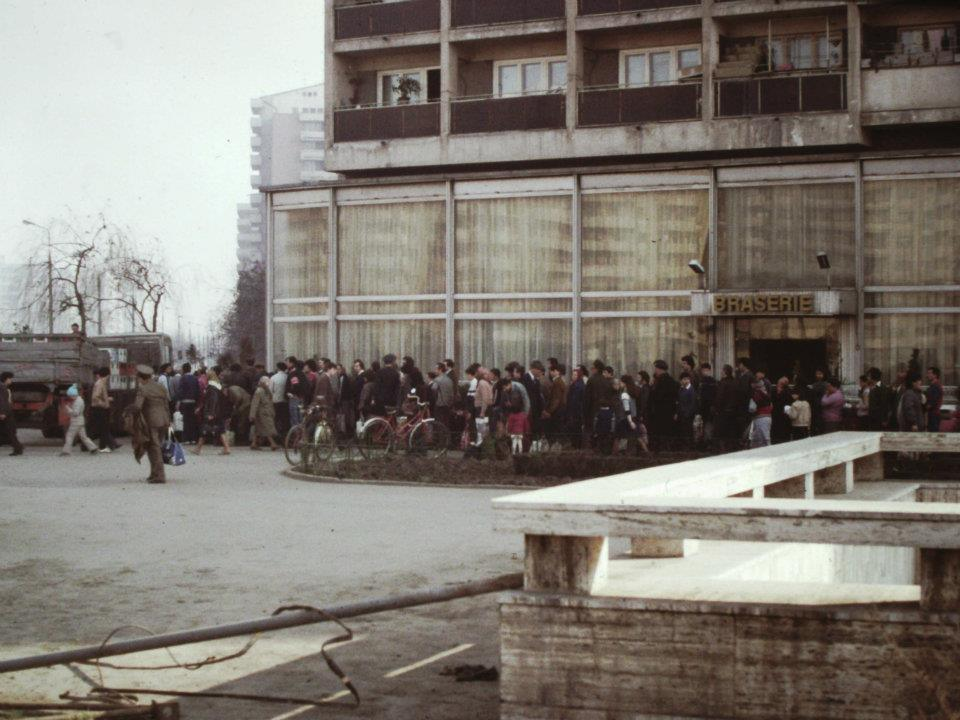
A queue for cooking oil during Ceausescu's austerity measures in Bucur Obor, 1986

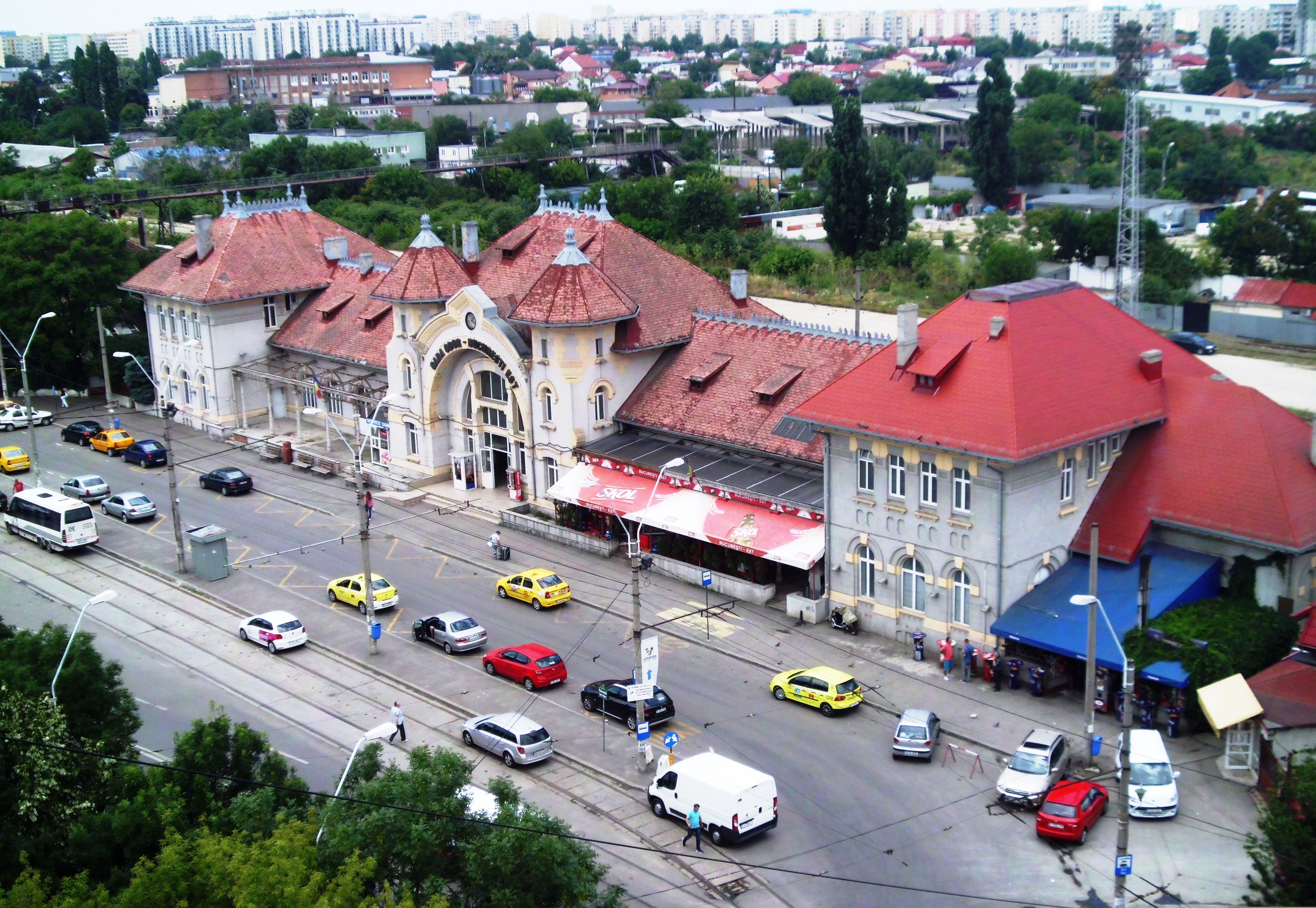
The Obor railway station

Obor is the name of a square and the surrounding district of Bucharest, the capital of Romania. There is also a Bucharest Metro station (on the M1 line) named Obor, which lies in this area. The district is near the Colentina and Moșilor neighborhoods.

Obor stands in the place of "Târgul Moșilor", a fair famous throughout Wallachia, which was held twice a week. In Old Romanian, "obor" meant enclosure, corral. Located outside the city, in the 18th century, it was also the place for public hangings. About 20 Turks captured from wars were hanged here by the Romanians.

The Obor Market (Piața Obor), the direct successor of the original fair, was, until 2007, Bucharest's largest public market. It covered about 16 city blocks and included a variety of indoor and outdoor market spaces, with goods ranging from compact discs to live chickens. During his official visit to Romania in August 1969, President Richard Nixon paid a visit to the Obor Market, where he tasted the grapes. Informally, the market spilled into the surrounding neighborhood, both in terms of street vendors and in terms of the nearby Magazin Universal ("Universal Store") named Bucur Obor, a large commercial building and housing estate (officially named the ALMO housing estate, built in 1975 and renovated in 2013 and 2017) that has been parcelled up into hundreds of small, independent retail stores. The market was demolished, not without public outcry, in order to pave the way for a modern market and a small park, thus ending a 300-year tradition.

The Veranda Mall, which lies close to the Obor metro station, was inaugurated in October 2016. With a 30,000 m^{2} (320,000 sq ft) surface, it includes 18 fashion and footwear shops, restaurants, children's playgrounds, a cinema, and a gym, as well as a 10,000 m^{2} (110,000 sq ft) Carrefour hypermarket.

In Romanian popular culture, the neighborhood is referenced by Gică Petrescu in his song Uite-așa aș vrea să mor, in which the artist playfully expresses his desire to be buried in a tavern in the area with a glass of red wine in his hand. Among Bucharest dwellers, it has attained a reputation as a market of relatively cheap products, albeit sometimes of low quality.

The Obor railway station was inaugurated in 1903.
