= Chesarie Căpățână =

Wallachian bishop (1784–1846)

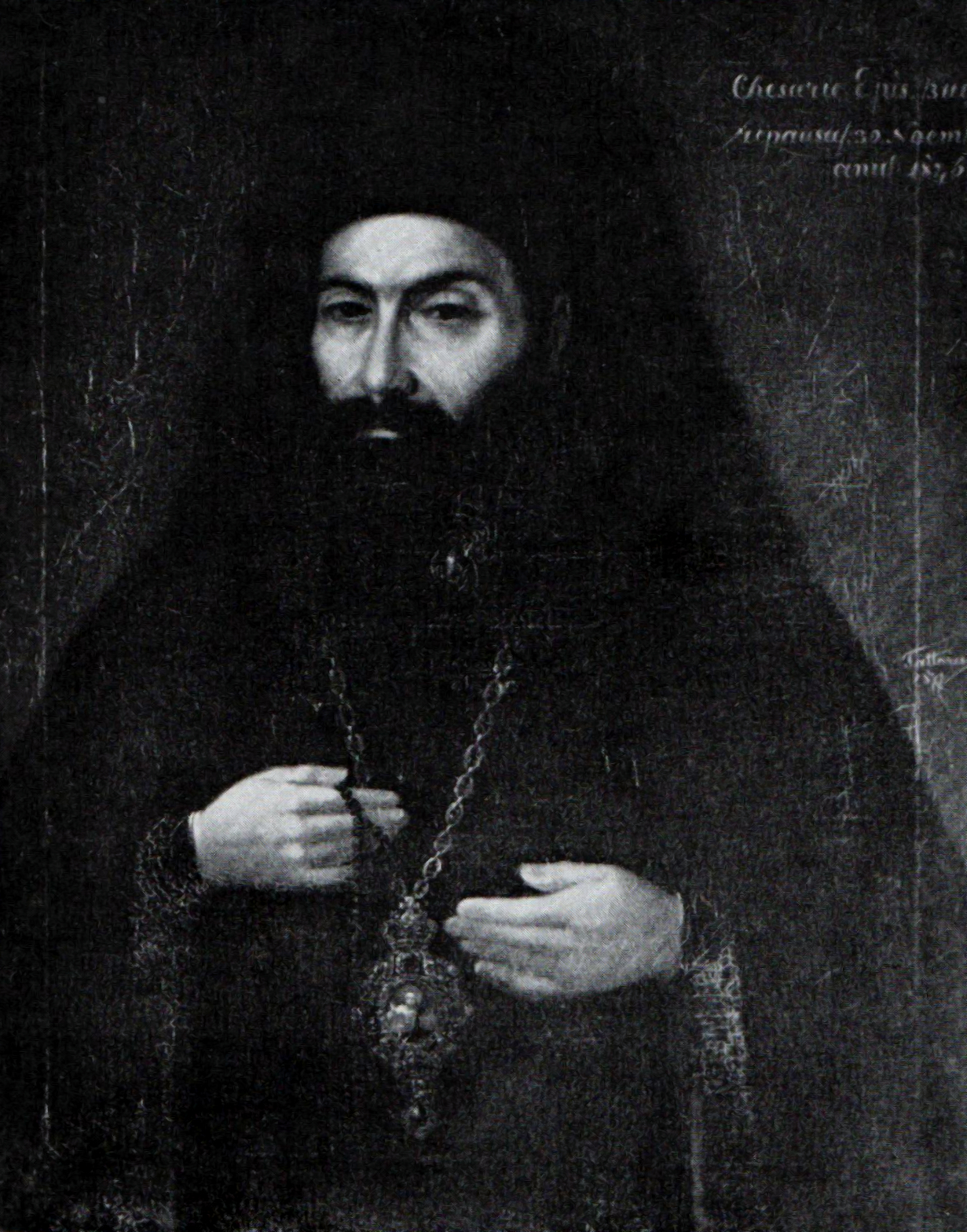
Bishop Chesarie, as painted by Gheorghe Tattarescu, whose benefactor he was

Chesarie Căpățână (born Constantin Căpățână; 1784 – November 30, 1846) was a Wallachian bishop.

== Biography ==
=== Origins and ascension ===
Born in Bucharest to a poor couple, Efrem Cavafu and his wife Dragna, he attended the Greek school at Domnița Bălașa Church, then studied psaltic music under Dionisie Fotino, with Anton Pann as a classmate. After finishing school and encouraged by his protector, Iosif Sevastos, the first Bishop of Argeș, he entered Antim Monastery, taking the name Chesarie. In 1823, his honesty and dedication led Grigorie Miculescu, the Metropolitan of Ungro-Wallachia, to take on Chesarie as supervisor at the cathedral.

In 1824, the Diocese of Buzău fell vacant. Two candidates emerged, but Grigorie rejected them both in favor of Chesarie, recommending the proposal to Prince Grigore IV Ghica. As a result, he was elected in April 1825. In his enthronement speech, Chesarie struck a patriotic note, in tune with the nascent national awakening of Romania, praising the Wallachian uprising of 1821 and its leader Tudor Vladimirescu.

=== Achievements as bishop ===
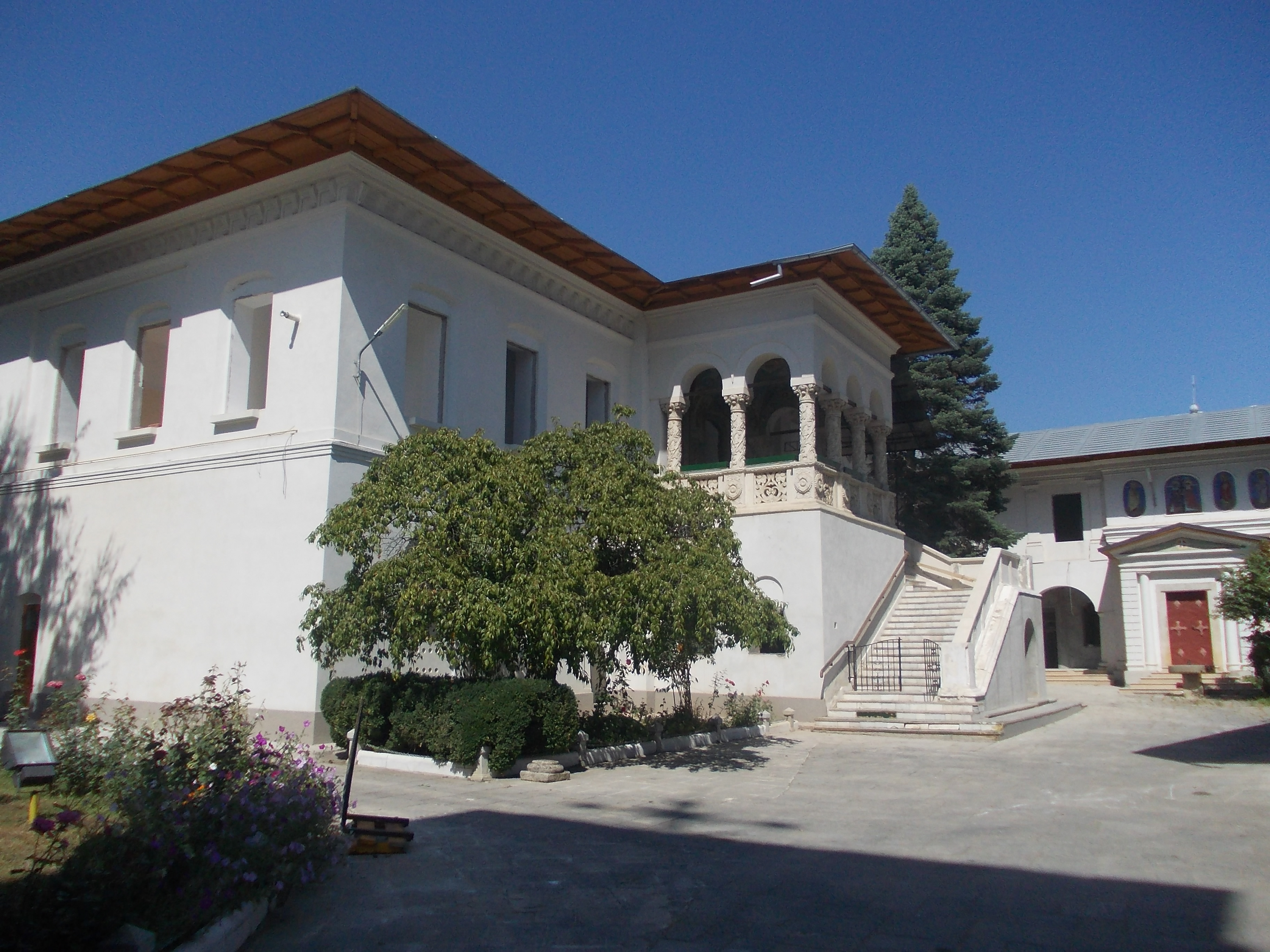
The original building of the Buzău Seminary, founded by Chesarie

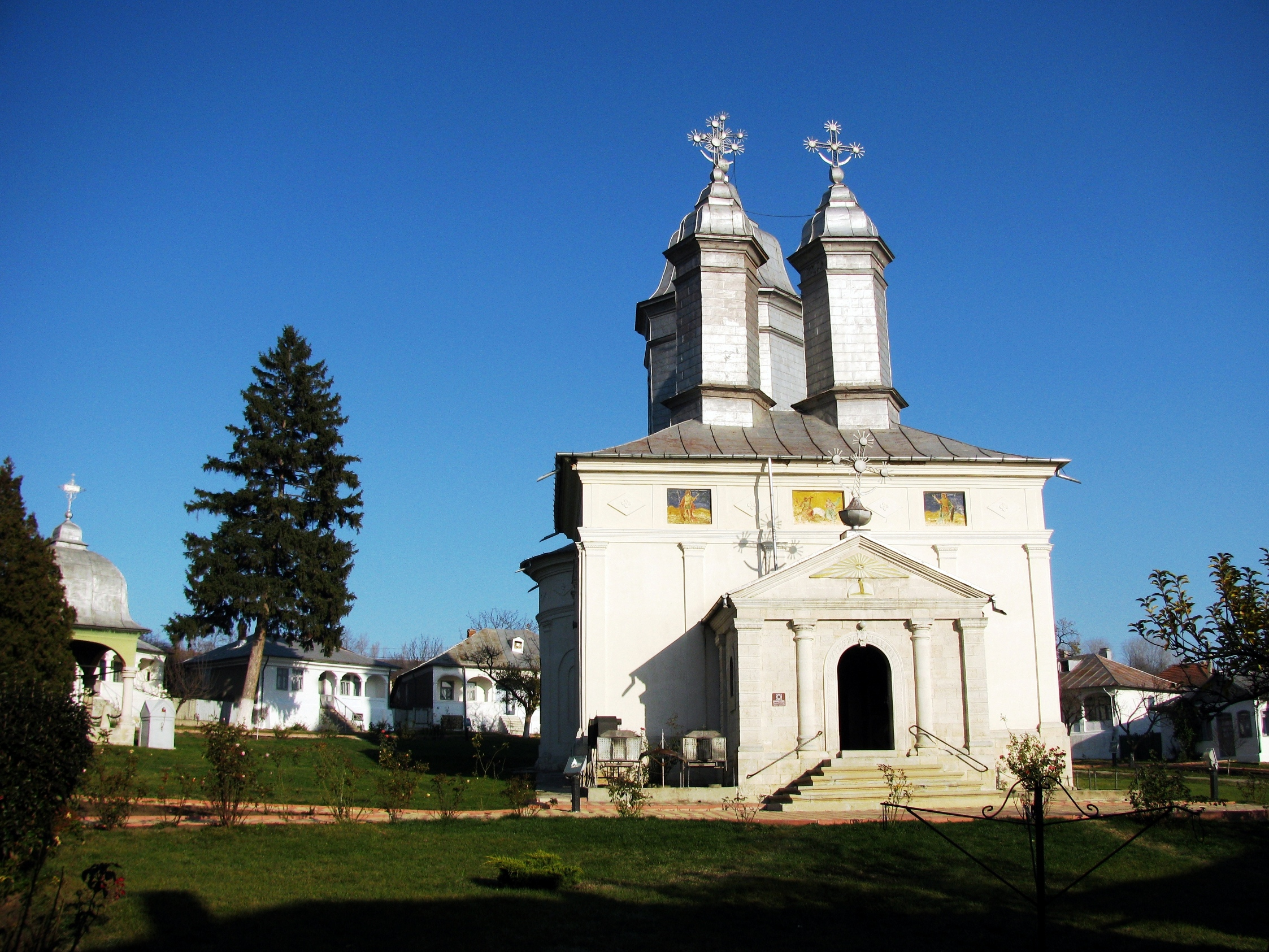
The church of Rătești Monastery, built under Chesarie

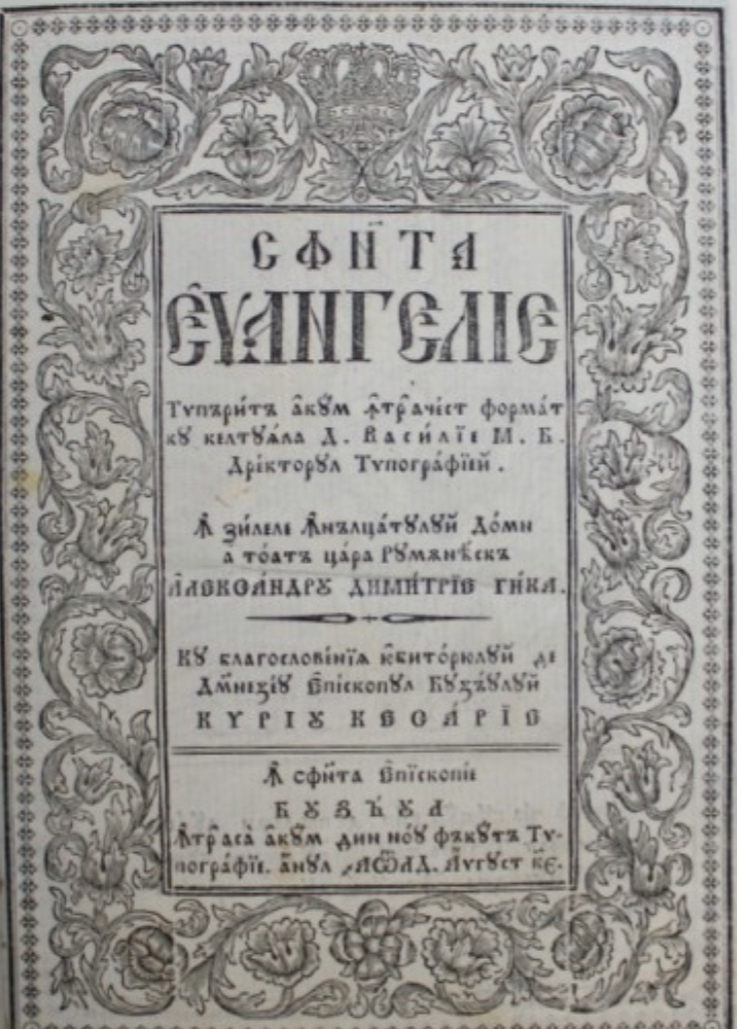
Gospel Book published at Buzău in 1834; the bishop's name appears as КЄСАРІЄ

Over the course of his reign, Chesarie restored or founded (as ktetor) tens of sacred buildings, including the Buzău Cathedral; the monasteries of Râmnicu Sărat, Rătești, Ciolanu and Cheia; the churches of St. Demetrius–Poștă and Holy Angels. Chesarie also valued learning and education, especially focusing on the training of knowledgeable priests. He resounded the diocesan printing press, dormant since 1768, printing his first book in 1834. In his enthusiasm for the project, he bought a new press and Romanian Cyrillic letters from the University of Buda, hiring workers from Neamț Monastery. He printed not only religious books, but also secular school textbooks. By 1846, some sixty titles had emerged from the press, including the first Romanian church newspaper, Vestitorul Bisericesc (1839-1840); future bishop Dionisie Romano played an increasingly active role in the enterprise.

From Metropolitan Grigorie's death in June 1834 until a successor was chosen in 1840, Chesarie was one of three locum tenentes holding the leadership of the metropolis. Meanwhile, he opened schools for church singers, sculptors and painters, the last founded in 1831. In 1832, he founded the first Romanian-language school in Buzău; Romano was the teacher, with fifty students in three grades. In every school he founded, Chesarie insisted on hiring qualified, well-trained faculty, and the students would go on to become prominent priests, bishops and painters. He selected Nicolae Teodorescu as art teacher, and financed student Gheorghe Tattarescu’s academic stay in Italy. He paid particular attention to sacred music, promoting the printing of books in the domain, pushing Pann to publish various collections of hymns, requiring each monastery in the diocese to send one student to train at the school; among its students was future metropolitan Iosif Naniescu.

Chesarie was the founder of the Buzău seminary, which opened in August 1836 with twenty students on scholarship from the diocese and eight paying students. Its goal was for each graduate to become a priest or deacon, and was animated by the bishop’s belief that anyone with important responsibilities had a primary duty for educating the youth. The first director was Gavriil Munteanu. Other faculty included Damaschin Bojincă and Iosafat Snagoveanu. A dedicated seminary building opened in late 1838; this 16-room neoclassical palace, in a town of poor dwellings and unpaved roads, drew notice from many visitors. Chesarie established the seminary library from his own funds, endowing it with Romanian as well as foreign books. In addition, he was attentive to the issues of monastic life, authoring a rule for the monks of Ciolanu.

Chesarie died in 1846, after lying ill with pneumonia for a week. He was buried outside the Buzău Cathedral.
