= Nicolae Teodorescu =

Romanian artist (1797–1880)

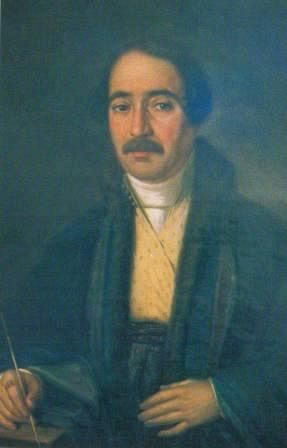
Nicolae Teodorescu, self-portrait

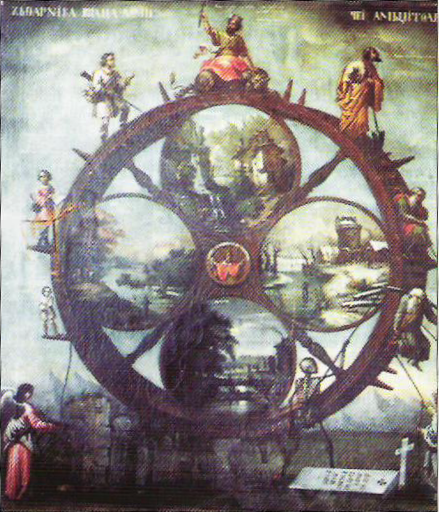
"The World's Wheel" – a painting by Teodorescu depicting the stages of a man's life

Nicolae Teodorescu (Romanian pronunciation: [nikoˈla.e te.odoˈresku]; 1797–1880) was a Moldavian, later Romanian church painter (muralist), and the uncle of artist Gheorghe Tattarescu.

Born in Focșani, he was initiated to the muralist trade by Nicolae Polcovnicul and Matei Zugravul. In 1831, he was called on by Chesarie Căpățână, the Orthodox bishop of Buzău to open a school for church painters at the local bishopric. He also brought his nephew (an orphan) to study there. In 1844, he was given the title of pitar by Prince Gheorghe Bibescu.

In his over 50-years career, Teodorescu painted several churches in and around Buzău, such as the churches at the Ciolanu and Rătești monasteries and the Banului Church in Buzău. At the Church of Saint Archangels Michael and Gabriel from the Berca Monastery he painted over murals executed in 1694 by Pârvu Mutu.

One of his best-known works is "The World's Wheel" (Roata Lumii), also known as "The Life's Wheel" (Roata Vieții). Painted in 1867, the artwork is displayed at the Museum of the Archdiocese of Buzău and Vrancea.

A street in Odobești (a town where he lived for many years) was named after him in 2007.
