= Pădurenii =

Pădurenii may refer to several villages in Romania:

- Pădurenii, a village in Tisău Commune, Buzău County
- Pădurenii, a village in Mintiu Gherlii Commune, Cluj County
- Pădurenii, a village in Tritenii de Jos Commune, Cluj County
