= Nișcov =

- Location within Romania

Location
- Country: Romania
- Counties: Buzău County
- Villages: Tisău, Haleș, Nișcov

Physical characteristics
- Mouth: Buzău
  - location: Vernești
  - coordinates: 45.2093°N 26.7481°E
- Length: 40 km (25 mi)
- Basin size: 222 km^{2} (86 sq mi)

Basin features
- Progression: Buzău→ Siret→ Danube→ Black Sea
- Tributaries
  - left: Tisău, Haleșiu, Izvoranu

The Nișcov is a right tributary of the river Buzău in Romania. It discharges into the Buzău in Vernești. Its length is 40 km (25 mi) and its basin size is 222 km^{2} (86 sq mi).
