= Rătești Monastery =

Coordinates: 45.307636°N 26.631879°E

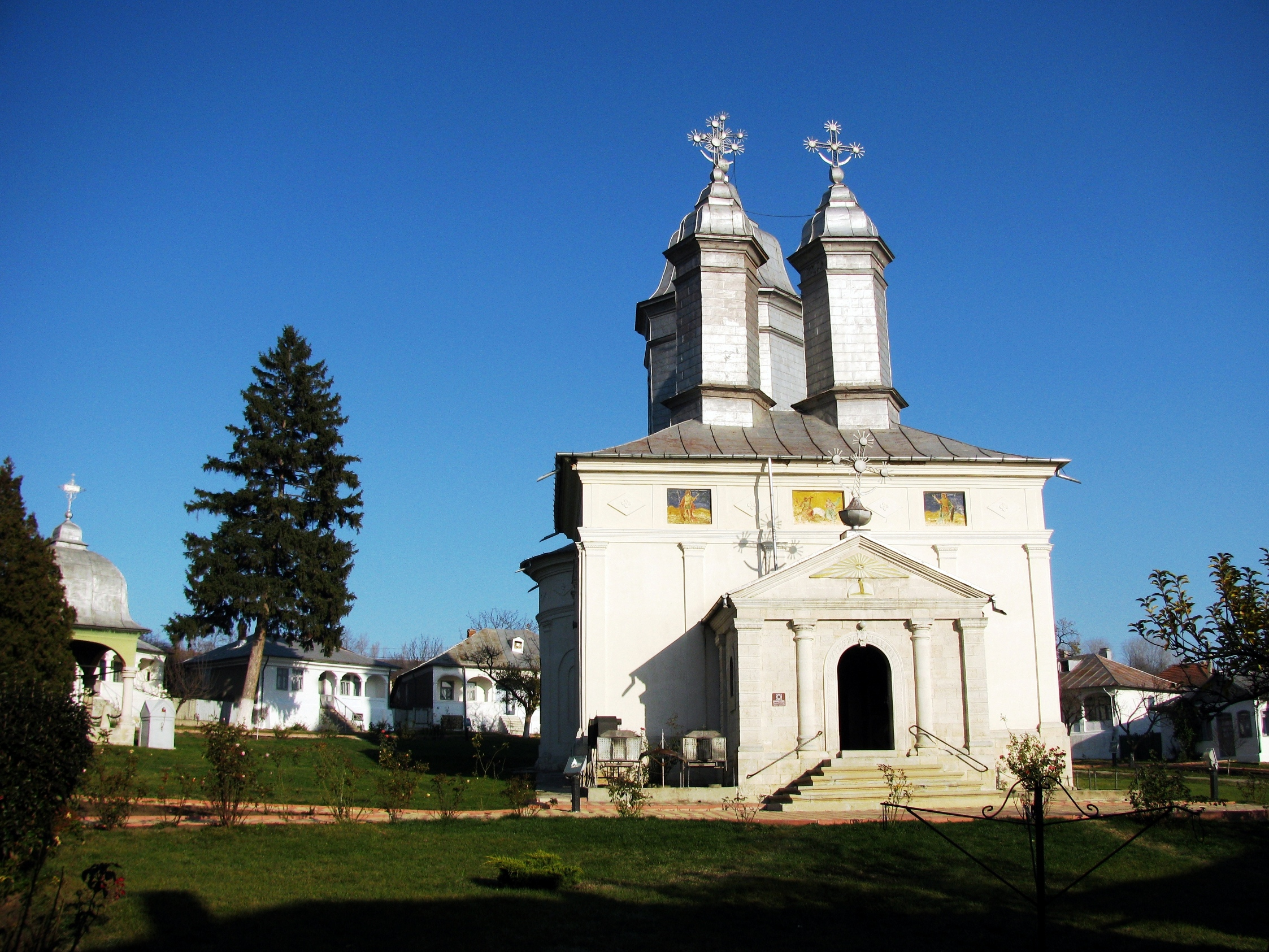
Holy Trinity Church at Rătești Monastery

Rătești Monastery is a monastery of Eastern Orthodox nuns located in Berca Commune, Buzău County, Romania, on the left bank of the Buzău River.

== History ==
The monastery was erected by the boyar family of Dragomir, an army captain. The oldest known document relating to it is a donation deed, dated 6 May 1634. At the time, it was a monastery of monks. Because of the lack of monks, the monastery went deserted in 1752, and in 1760 was revived as community of nuns.

As of 2006, about 75 nuns live there.

It is deserted since 2014 following a landslide. A smaller monastery has been built across the road.

== Architecture ==
The monastery church was built in a mixed neoclassical and local ecclesiastical style. It was painted in 1843–1844 by Nicolae Teodorescu and his nephew Gheorghe Tattarescu.

The bell tower, erected by Dionisie Romano in 1854, was re-designed and reduced in height to 18 meters in 1894, when it was rebuilt after an earthquake.

== The museum ==
The compound includes a museum, near the water-well (which dates from 1911). The museum was opened in 1975, in a wide hall painted in 1859 by a monk from the nearby Ciolanu Monastery. It exhibits a multi-language Bible printed in 1629 in Greek, Latin and Hebrew. The visitors can also see a fragment of the original 1688 Bucharest Bible, the first edition translated into Romanian, along with the anniversary reprint of the Bucharest Bible from 1988.

Other items on display are numerous icons painted on wood or glass, as well as gold and silver-thread embroidery.

== Gallery ==
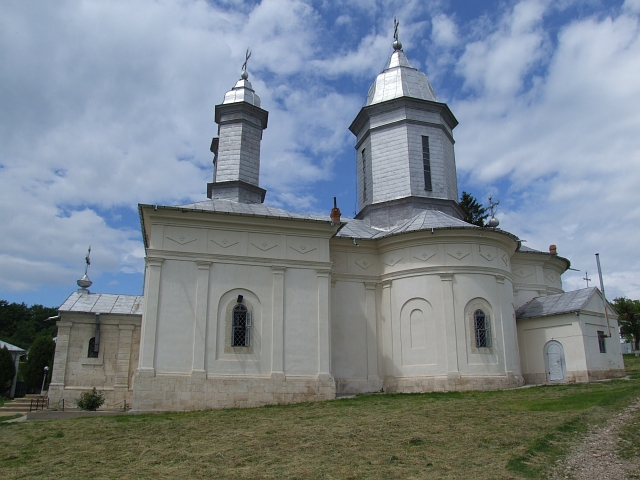
Rătești Monastery

Outside view from Rătești Monastery

Wall picture from Rătești Monastery

Wall picture from Rătești Monastery
