= St. Demetrius–Poștă Church =

Heritage site in Bucharest, Romania

Coordinates: 44°25′51″N 26°05′56″E

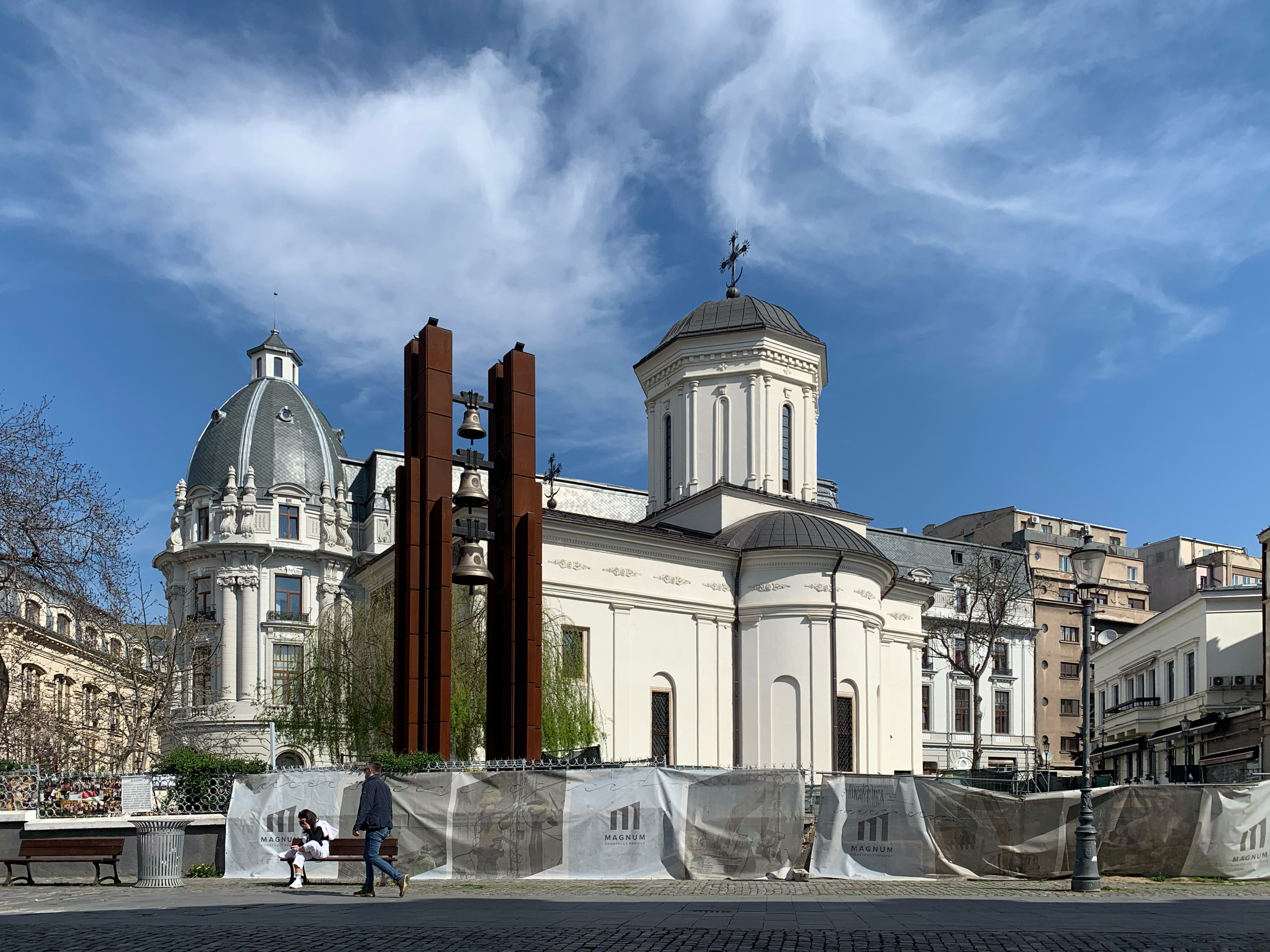
St. Demetrius–Poștă Church

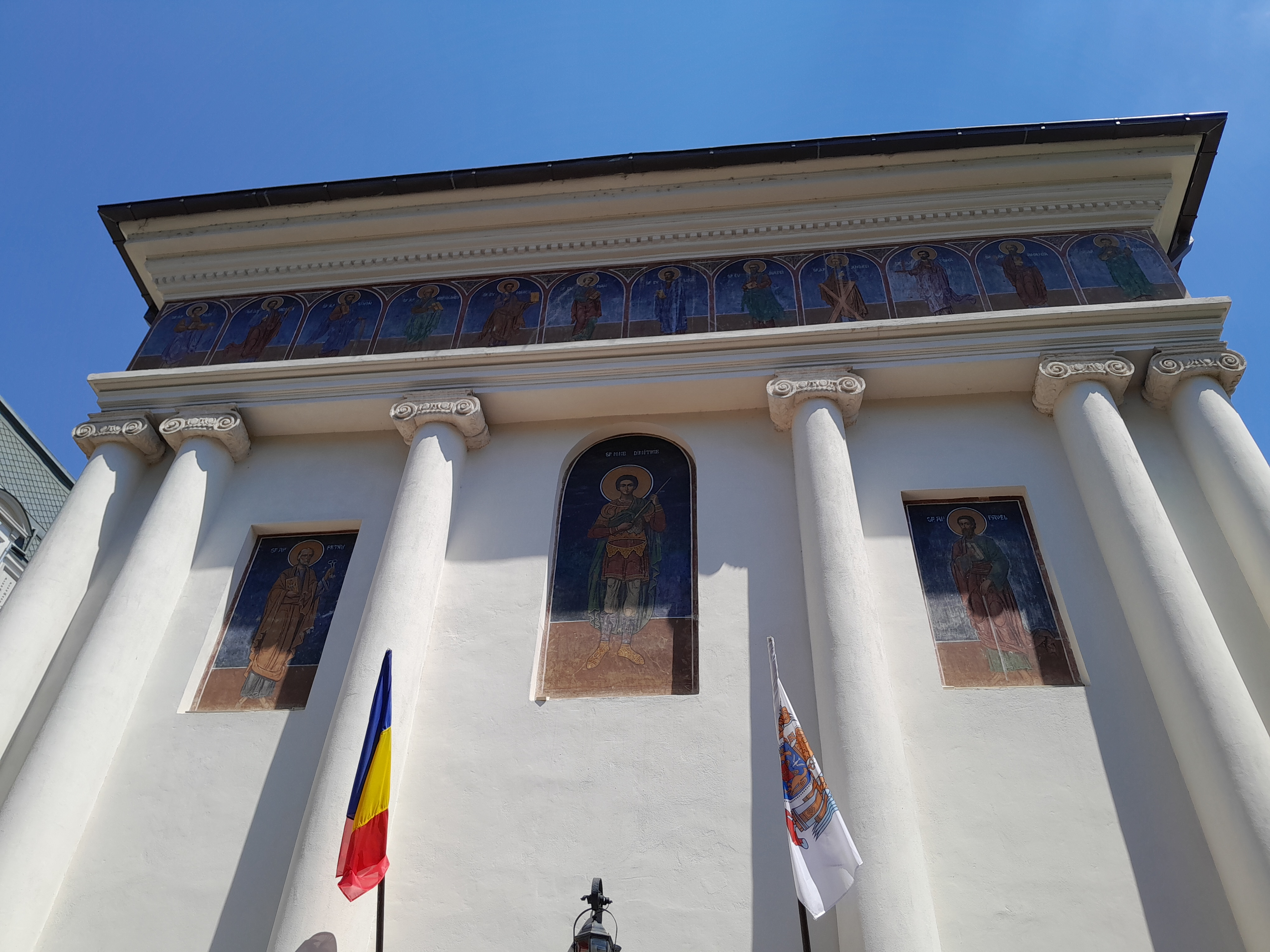
Exterior

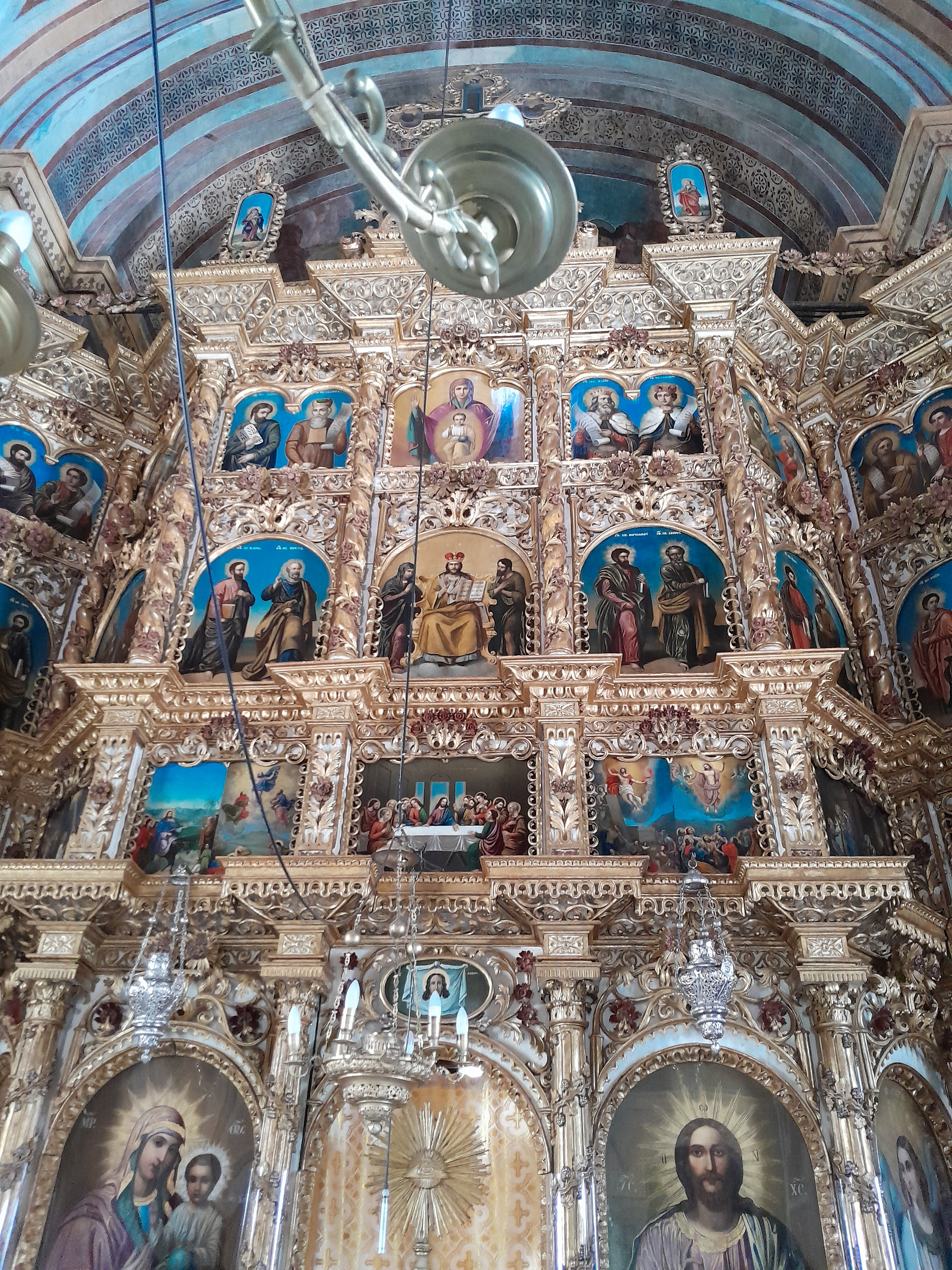
Interior

St. Demetrius–Poștă Church (Romanian: Biserica Sfântul Dimitrie–Poștă) is a Romanian Orthodox church located at 2 Poștei Street in the Lipscani district of Bucharest, Romania. It is dedicated to Demetrius of Thessaloniki.

A church existed on the site around 1500. Probably destroyed after the Battle of Călugăreni in 1595 and rebuilt after 1600, the subsequent church is mentioned in a document of 1680. Before 1690, the church was rebuilt by Badea Bălăceanu, the brother-in-law of Șerban Cantacuzino. Made of wood, it did not last long. It was rebuilt in stone in 1741–1746, was in poor shape in 1797, severely damaged by the 1802 earthquake and burned in 1804.

The current structure was begun in 1819 by Buzău Bishop Constantin Filitti, continued by his successor Gherasim Rătescu and completed in 1843 by still another bishop, Chesarie Căpățână. Unusually for the period, contracts from 1819 between Filitti and an architect, a carpenter and three painters survive. The 1847 Great Fire of Bucharest destroyed the roof and paintings; repairs carried out in 1852 included a new roof, reinforced walls and new paintings by Carol Szathmari. By 1912, the church was again in ruins and proposed for demolition. It was saved and renovated by Ioan C. Filitti, a great-nephew of the bishop, with funds offered by Mayor Dimitrie Dobrescu. Reopening in 1930, it was further repaired in 1964–1966, 1986 (following the 1977 earthquake), 1995 and after 2002.

The cross-shaped church is 25.2 meters long by 9.5 meters wide, rising to a height of 13.9 meters. The narthex is small, the altar elongated. The Christ Pantocrator dome rises above the apses; it has eight sides on a square base. The roof is covered in tin. The facades are ornamented in Greek Revival style, while the pediment is in profile. The side pilasters are Doric, beneath a continuous floral decoration. The western side has six very tall Ionic columns, above which are medallions of the Twelve Apostles. Above the 1852 pisanie is a recessed icon of the patron saint, flanked by rectangular frames with Saints Peter and Paul. The interior painting is in realist style and does not respect the Byzantine canons. The Baroque iconostasis was carved at Buzău.

The church is listed as a historic monument by Romania's Ministry of Culture and Religious Affairs. Its nickname comes from the nearby Post Office Palace. It is also known as the “Church of Oath Taking” (Biserica de Jurământ), due to the solemn oaths people would swear near the altar.
