= New St. George Church =

Romanian Orthodox church in Bucharest, Romania,

- Biserica Sfântul Gheorghe Nou
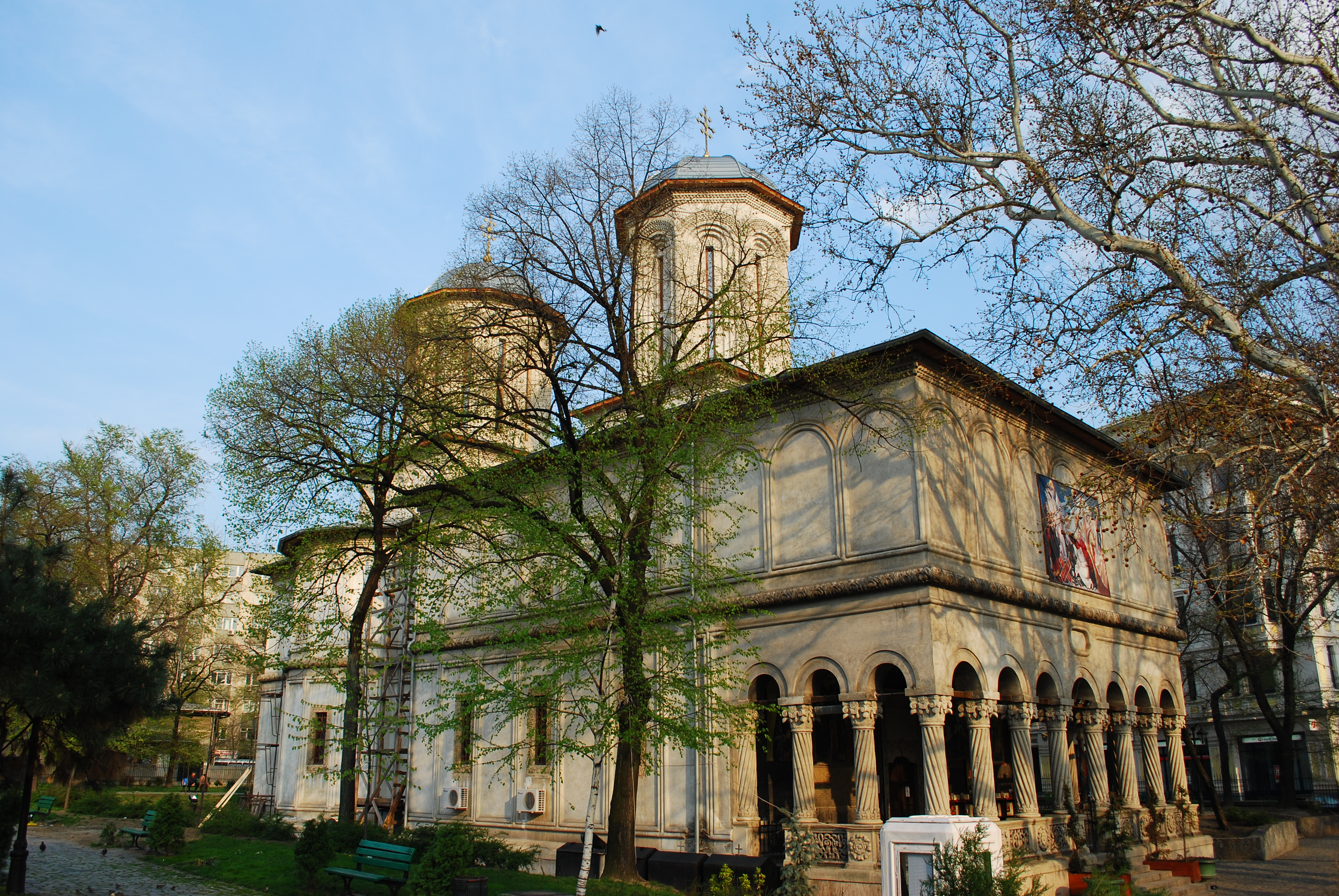

- Location within Bucharest

Religion
- Affiliation: Romanian Orthodox Church
- Patron: Saint George
- Year consecrated: 1707

Location
- Location: 49 I. C. Brătianu Boulevard, Sector 3, Bucharest, Romania
- Interactive map of New St. George Church
- Coordinates: 44°25′57.7″N 26°6′13.3″E

Architecture
- Groundbreaking: 1705
- Completed: 1706
- Monument istoric
- Type: Architectural Monument of National Interest
- Reference no.: LMI: B-II-m-A-18225

Website
- www.sfantulgheorghenou.ro

New St. George Church (Romanian: Biserica Sfântul Gheorghe Nou) is a Romanian Orthodox church located in Bucharest, Romania, along the city center's main north-south thoroughfare, where it intersects the Lipscani area. It is dedicated to Saint George. The church is associated with Constantin Brâncoveanu: it was built during his reign, and he is buried inside.

== History ==
The original church on the site was surrounded by a marketplace. Archaeological excavations carried out in 1966 indicate the presence of a 15th-century church foundation beneath the present structure. Made of river boulders alternating with rows of brick, it followed the prevalent Byzantine style and was divided into narthex, nave and altar. At the beginning of the 16th century, Ban Dobruș rebuilt the church using brick. The Old St. George Church was founded before this reconstruction, and the two designations likely arose after Dobruș‘ intervention. Over the course of the century, new cells were built for an inn, as recorded by chronicler Radu Greceanu.

During the reign of Prince Antonie Vodă din Popești (1669-1672), Panagiotis Nikousios, Dragoman of the Porte, ordered the entire complex rebuilt, with future prince Șerban Cantacuzino appointed Ispravnic. A 1671 document ordered the construction of a surrounding wall and cells, as well as buildings totaling sixteen rooms. The church itself was not completed at the time; the ktetor wished it to resemble one in Stenimachos. Such as it was, the entire monastic complex, unfinished at Nikousios‘ death, was dedicated to the Jerusalem Patriarchate in 1673.

Prince Constantin Brâncoveanu restarted work on the inn. The cells were finalized in 1696, and the entire building in 1698, according to that year's pisanie. This inscription, originally for the patriarchal houses and located in the church portico, mentions Dositheus II of Jerusalem, High Aga Ianache Văcărescu as Ispravnic, and prominent local merchants. In 1705, Brâncoveanu demolished the old church, building a large new one in its stead, with a marble floor. The architect, possibly Italian, directed a stonemason, a head of builders, a woodworker, and the painter, Pârvu Mutu. Construction lasted until the following year. The lavish consecration, held on the Feast of Saints Peter and Paul in 1707, featured Brâncoveanu and his court, a large assembly of priests and hierarchs, headed by Jerusalem Patriarch Chrysanthus, to whose church the complex (inn included) was dedicated, more precisely to the Church of the Holy Sepulchre.

In the 18th century, the monastery encompassed the church in the center; the bell tower at the entrance, featuring a massive bell designed to ring Bran-co van; patriarchal houses and a further row of well-designed houses for the abbot; large basements for warehouses; a row of arched ceilings, with trade carried out below; a similar row above, for cells and lodging rooms, in all some 200; several rooms in which a printing press functioned for a time; and several other structures, including a kitchen, a refectory and a 1715 chapel, which still existed in 1818. The inn was of paramount importance until it ceased to exist in 1847. A 1718 fire severely damaged the monastery and inn, with Prince John Mavrocordatos leading the reconstruction; when he died the following year, Brâncoveanu's widow Marica, as recompense for his kindly deeds for the family, allowed his burial inside. The 1802 earthquake destroyed the vaults and domes; the church was then rebuilt without domes.

What was sometimes known as the Wholesalers’ Inn (Hanul Toptangiilor) was destroyed by the Great Fire of Bucharest in 1847. The church was repaired between 1851 and 1855 under the supervision of architect Xavier Villacrosse; Constantin Lecca and Mișu Popp painted the interior. This intervention, in the view of Nicolae Iorga, “deformed” a “sparkling monument of Muntenian architecture”. The garden was laid out in the 1860s. The 1940 earthquake caused serious damage, collapsing the bell tower with its clock. Repairs followed, with the painting restored in 1950. A restoration led by Ștefan Balș, with the participation of Henrieta Delavrancea, began in 1968 and was largely completed by 1987; it sought to revive the church's original appearance, but was not without its critics. New interior frescoes were begun in 1998.

== Description ==
The largest Brâncovenesc church, it resembles several contemporary ones in Bucharest, all drawing inspiration for their enlarged narthex and cross shape from the Princely Church of St. Nicholas in Curtea de Argeș. The portico features seven arches in front and three on each side, resting on twelve columns with flowery capitals; the whole sits on a sculpted, fretted parapet. The portico ceiling has two vaults separated by a wide arch. The large square narthex has four columns supporting the central dome. Three arches resting on columns mark the entry into the nave; then follows the narrower crypt, covered by a very wide arch. The side apses are in slight relief, just wider than the narthex. A second, larger, dome rises above the nave; both are octagonal with square bases. The columns, parapets and domes all date to the Balș restoration.

The facades are divided into two nearly equal sections by a wide, ornamental string course. The lower part has rectangular panels with windows between them; the frames are of carved stone. The upper panels are of the same dimensions, but have blind arches. The domes have narrow windows inside a series of ever-smaller arches. The dome bases feature blind arches. Relics of Saint Nicholas are on display; brought to Wallachia, they were coated in gilt silver in 1599 and placed inside a small reliquary of sterling silver by Michael the Brave, Doamna Stanca and their son Nicolae Pătrașcu.

The relics of Brâncoveanu, his sons and his adviser Văcărescu, canonized as martyrs in 1992, are also inside. Initially, the prince's name was inscribed by his widow and daughter only on the silver candelabrum hanging above the grave; a 1720 inscription on the latter was only brought to light in 1914, by Iorga. The Brâncovenesc wooden iconostasis is well preserved, with several levels of arches and small columns, richly decorated with floral elements; the string courses dividing its levels are in openwork. For a time, while this was under repair, it was replaced by the Gothic Revival iconostasis of the Bradu-Staicu church, demolished in 1987.

A statue of Brâncoveanu by Oscar Han stands in front of the church, with the Kilometer Zero monument to the side. The church is listed as a historic monument by Romania's Ministry of Culture and Religious Affairs.

== Gallery ==
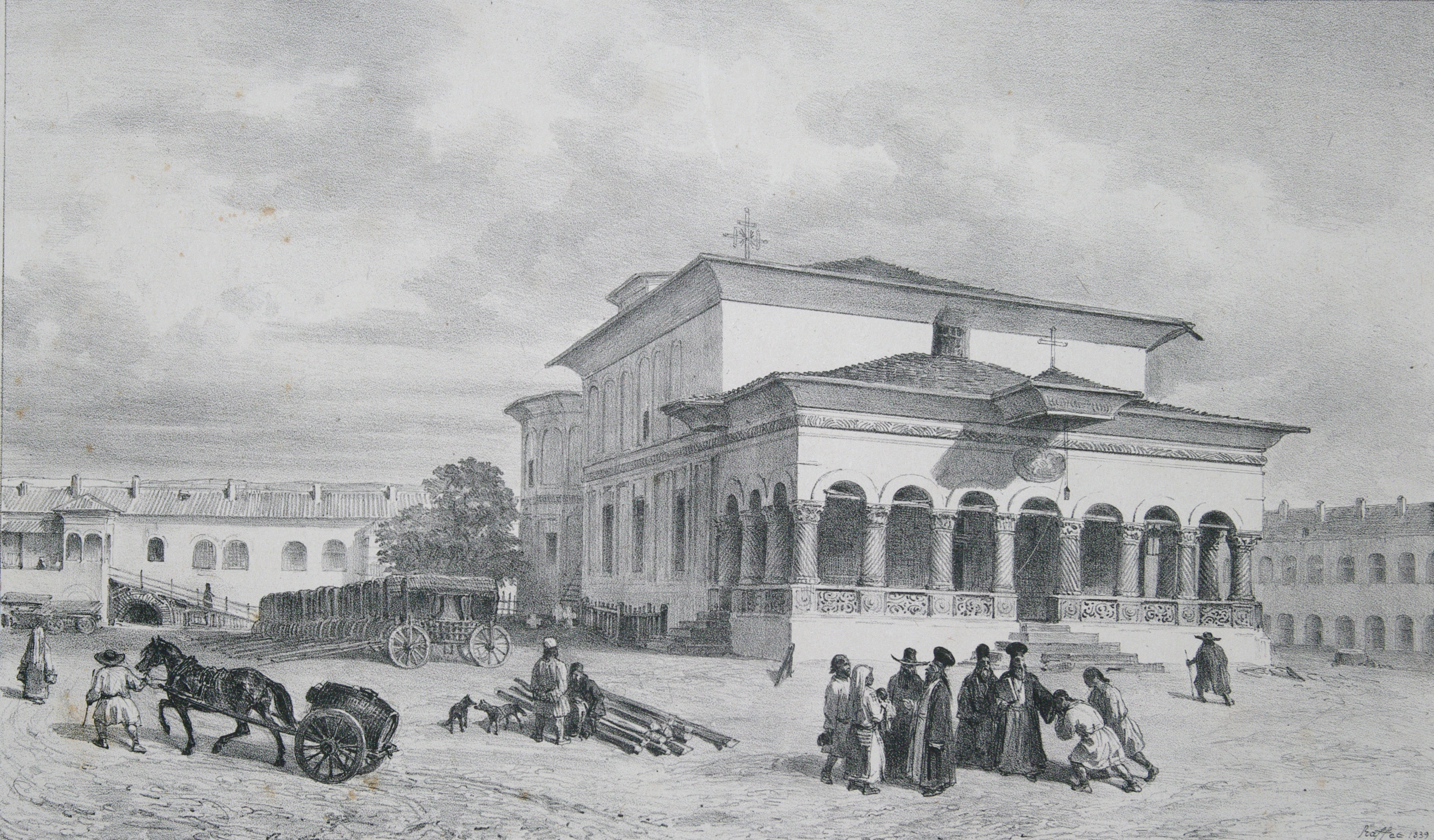
1837 depiction

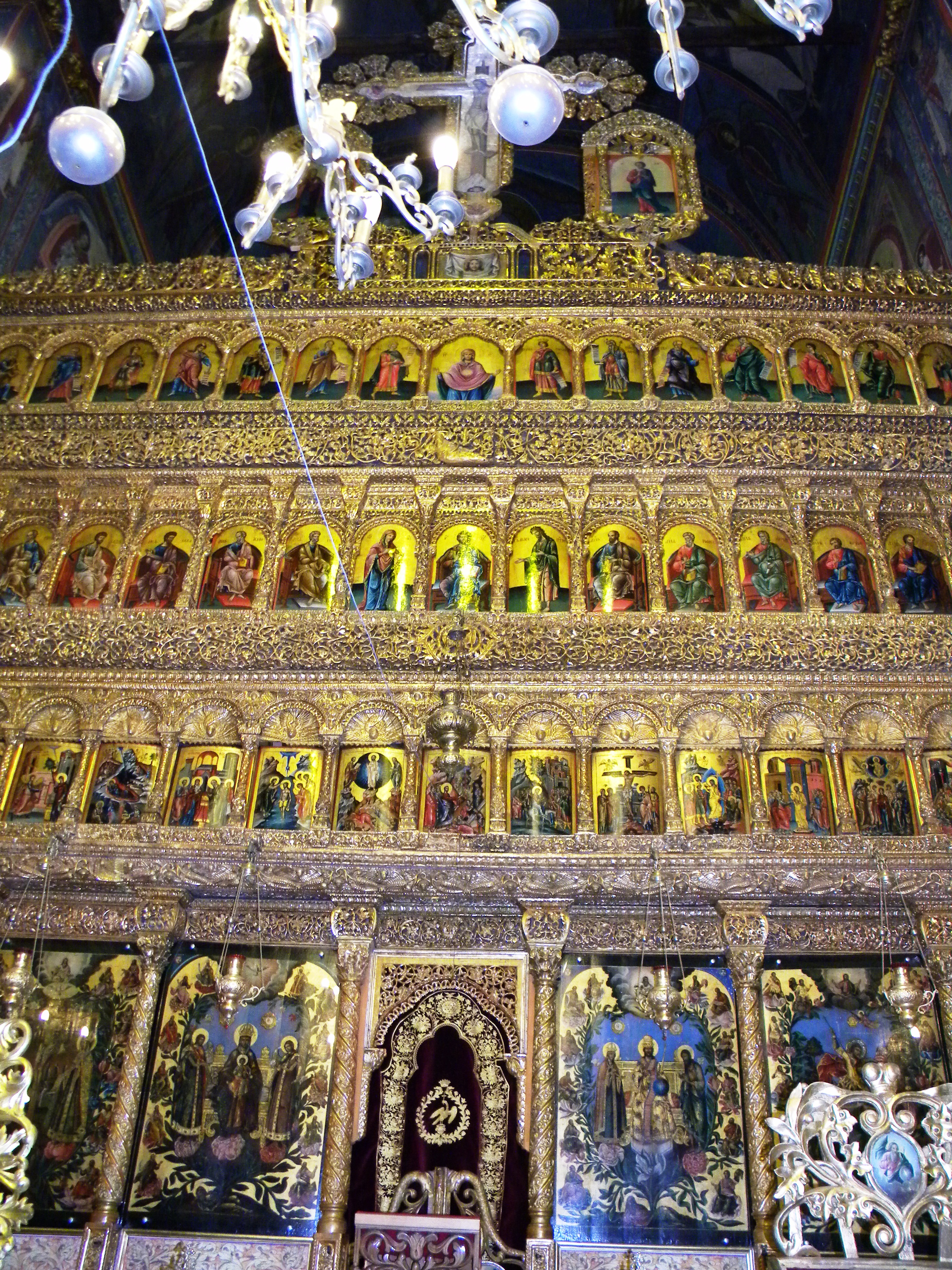
Iconostasis

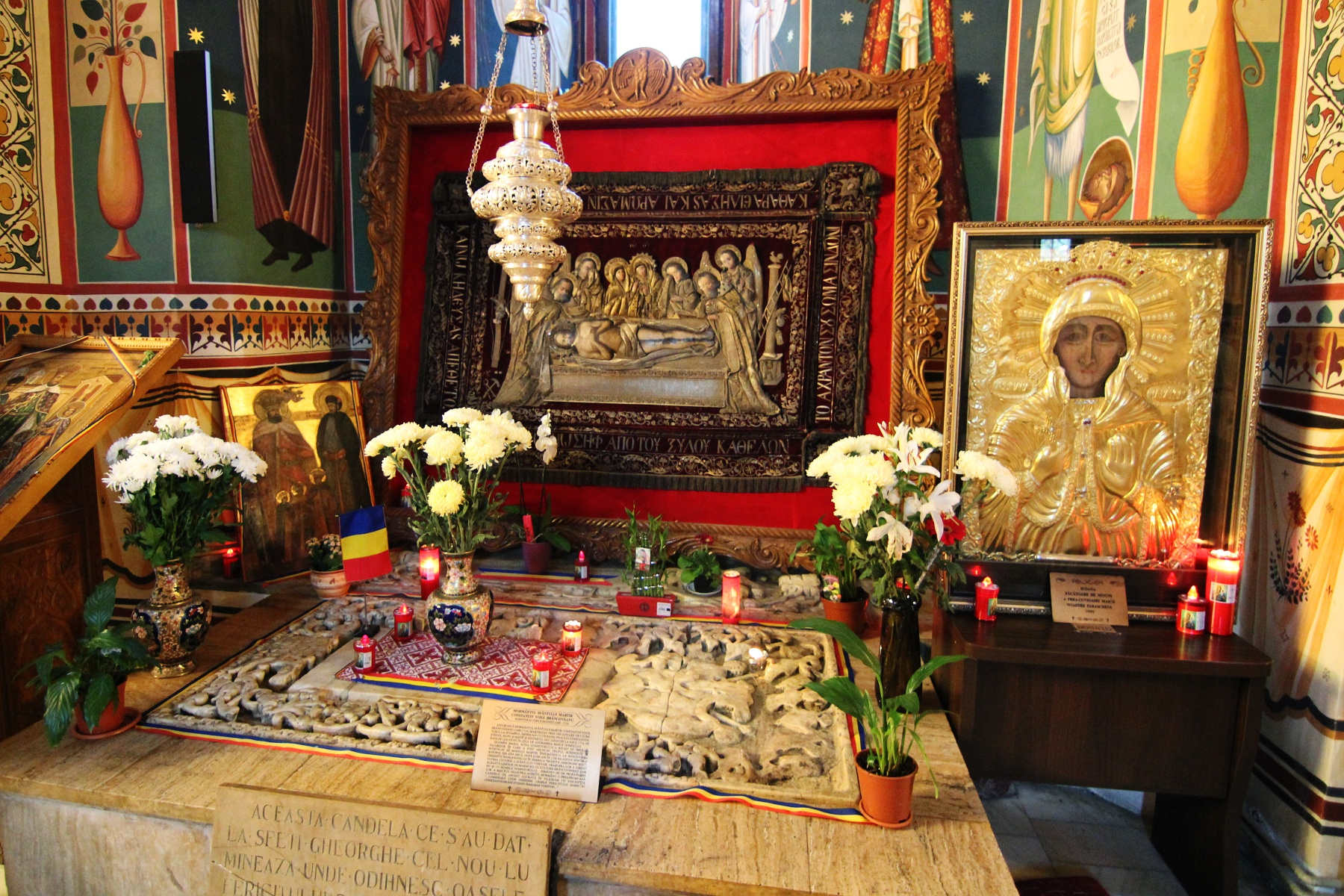
Brâncoveanu grave

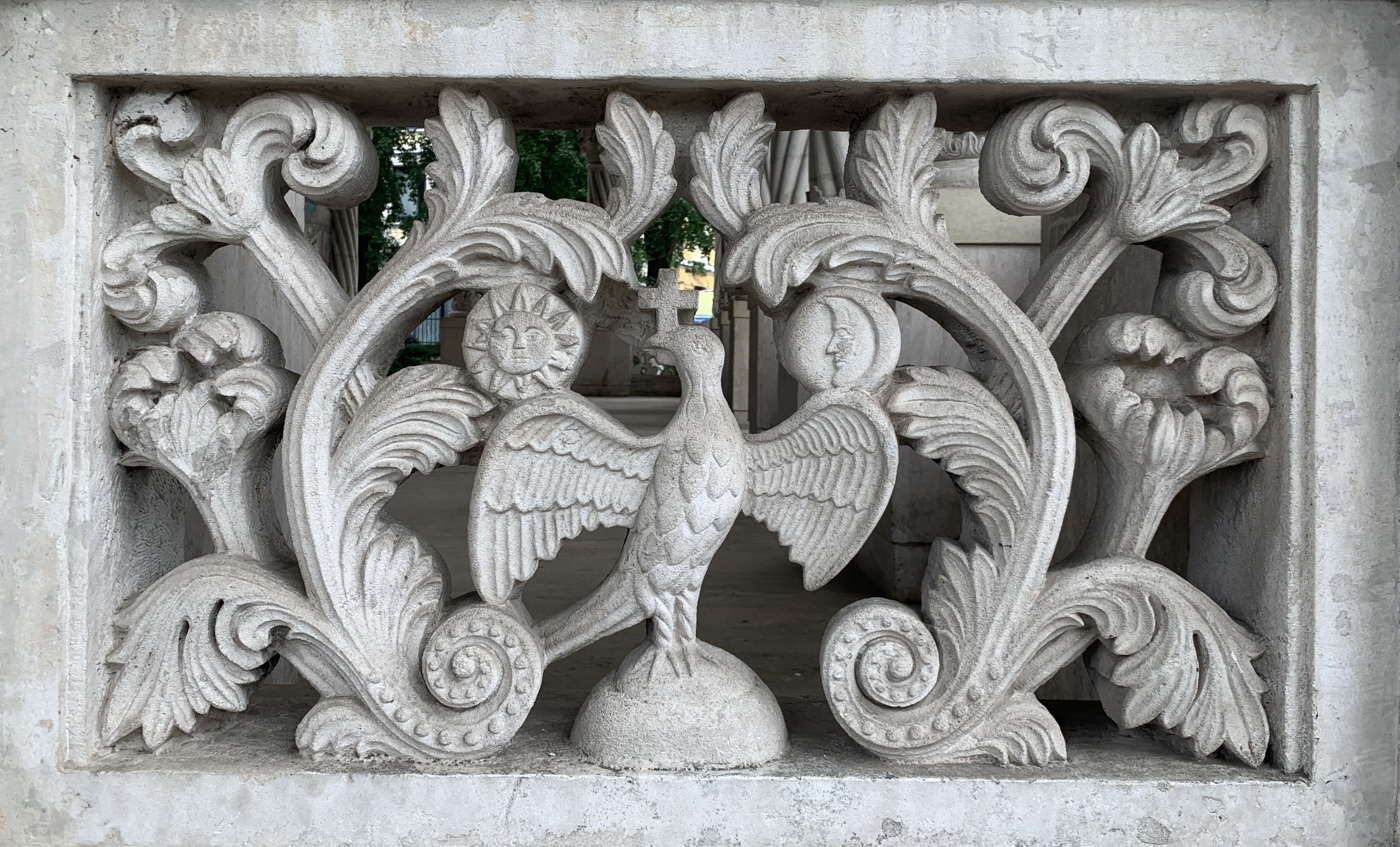
Parapet detail

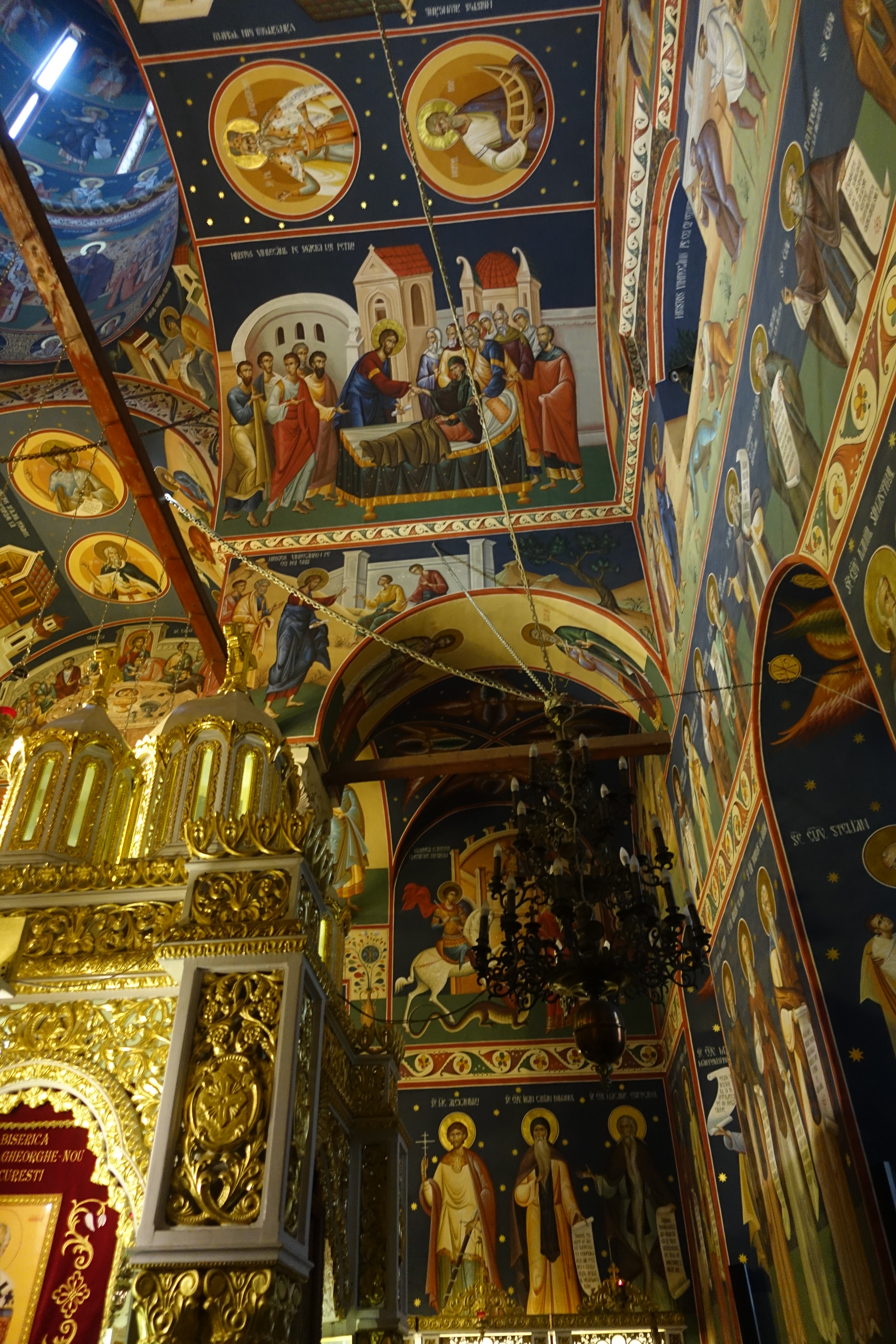
Interior detail

== Citations ==
=== Sources ===
- Lucia Stoica and Neculai Ionescu-Ghinea, Enciclopedia lăcașurilor de cult din București, vol. I. Bucharest: Editura Universalia, 2005, ISBN 973-7722-12-4
