= Tisău =

- Commune
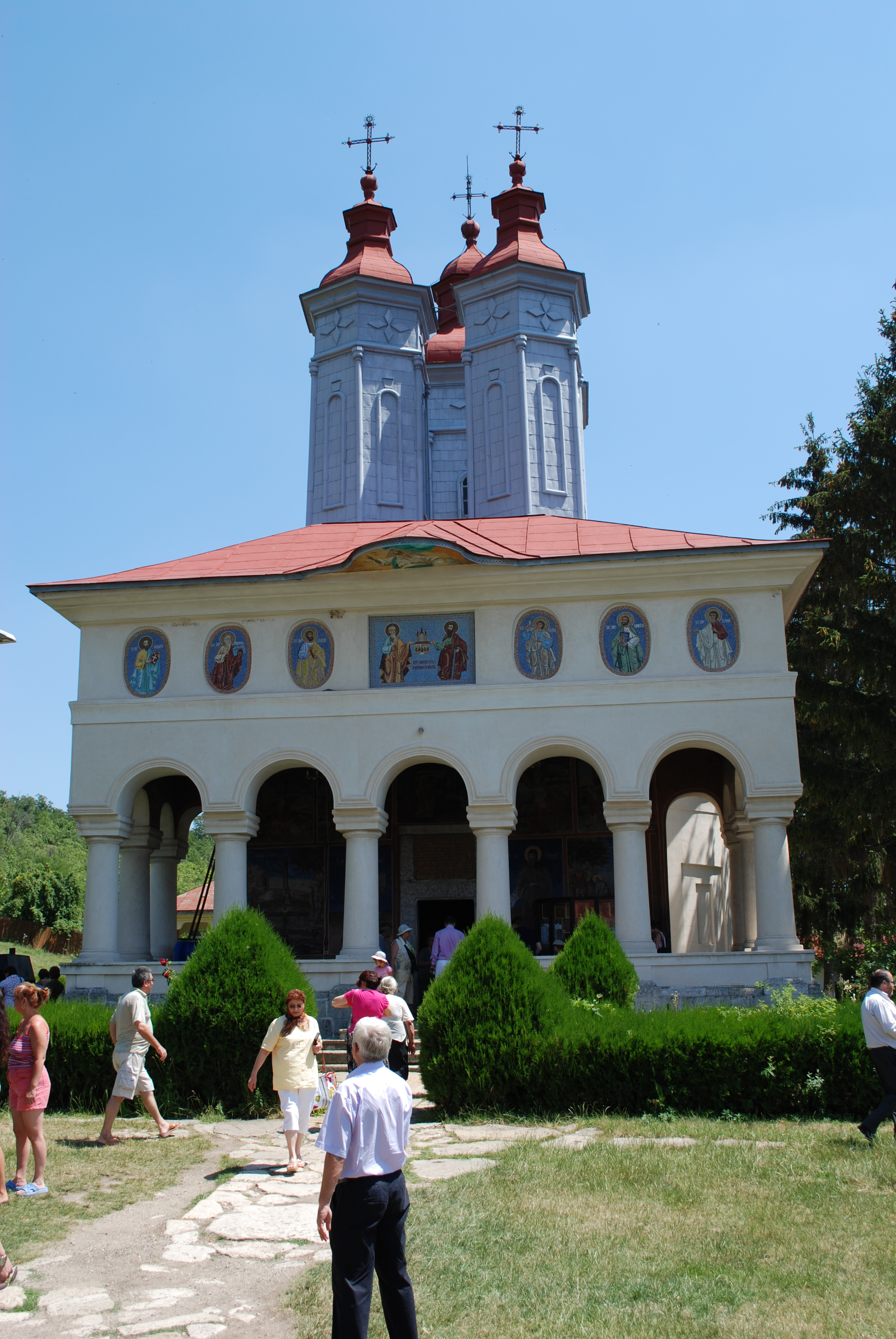
- Saints and Peter and Paul Church in Ciolanu Monastery

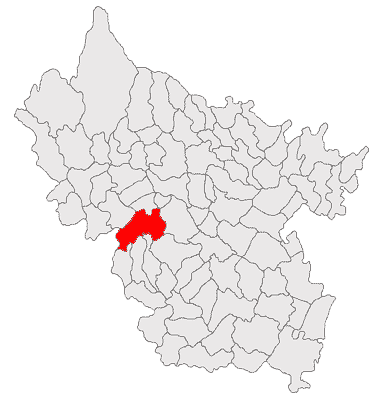
- Location in Buzău County

- Location in Romania
- Coordinates: 45°12′N 26°33′E
- Country: Romania
- County: Buzău
- Subdivisions: Bărbuncești, Grăjdana, Haleș, Izvoranu, Izvoru, Leiculești, Pădurenii, Salcia, Strezeni, Tisău, Valea Sălciilor

Government
  - Mayor (2020–2024): Cristian-Ionel Mihai (PNL)
- Area: 98.89 km^{2} (38.18 sq mi)
- Elevation: 206 m (676 ft)
- Population (2021-12-01): 4,314
  - Density: 43.62/km^{2} (113.0/sq mi)
- Time zone: UTC+02:00 (EET)
  - Summer (DST): UTC+03:00 (EEST)
- Postal code: 127610
- Area code: +(40) 238
- Vehicle reg.: BZ
- Website: comunatisau.ro

Tisău is a commune in Buzău County, Muntenia, Romania. It is composed of eleven villages: Bărbuncești, Grăjdana, Haleș, Izvoranu, Izvoru (the commune centre), Leiculești, Pădurenii, Salcia, Strezeni, Tisău, and Valea Sălciilor.

The commune is located in the western part of the county, on the border with Prahova County. It lies in the hilly area south of the Curvature Carpathians, on the banks of the Nișcov River (a right tributary of the Buzău River).

Tisău is traversed by county road DJ100H, which connects it to the east to Vernești (where it ends in national road DN10) and to the southwest to Mizil.

Ciolanu Monastery is located on the territory of the commune.

Historical population
Year	Pop.	±%
2002	5,176	—
2011	4,704	−9.1%
2021	4,314	−8.3%
Source: Census data

== Natives ==
- Alexandru Drăghici (1913–1993), communist activist and politician
