= Kilometer Zero (Bucharest) =

Monument in Bucharest, Romania

Coordinates: 44°25′57.87″N 26°6′14.05″E

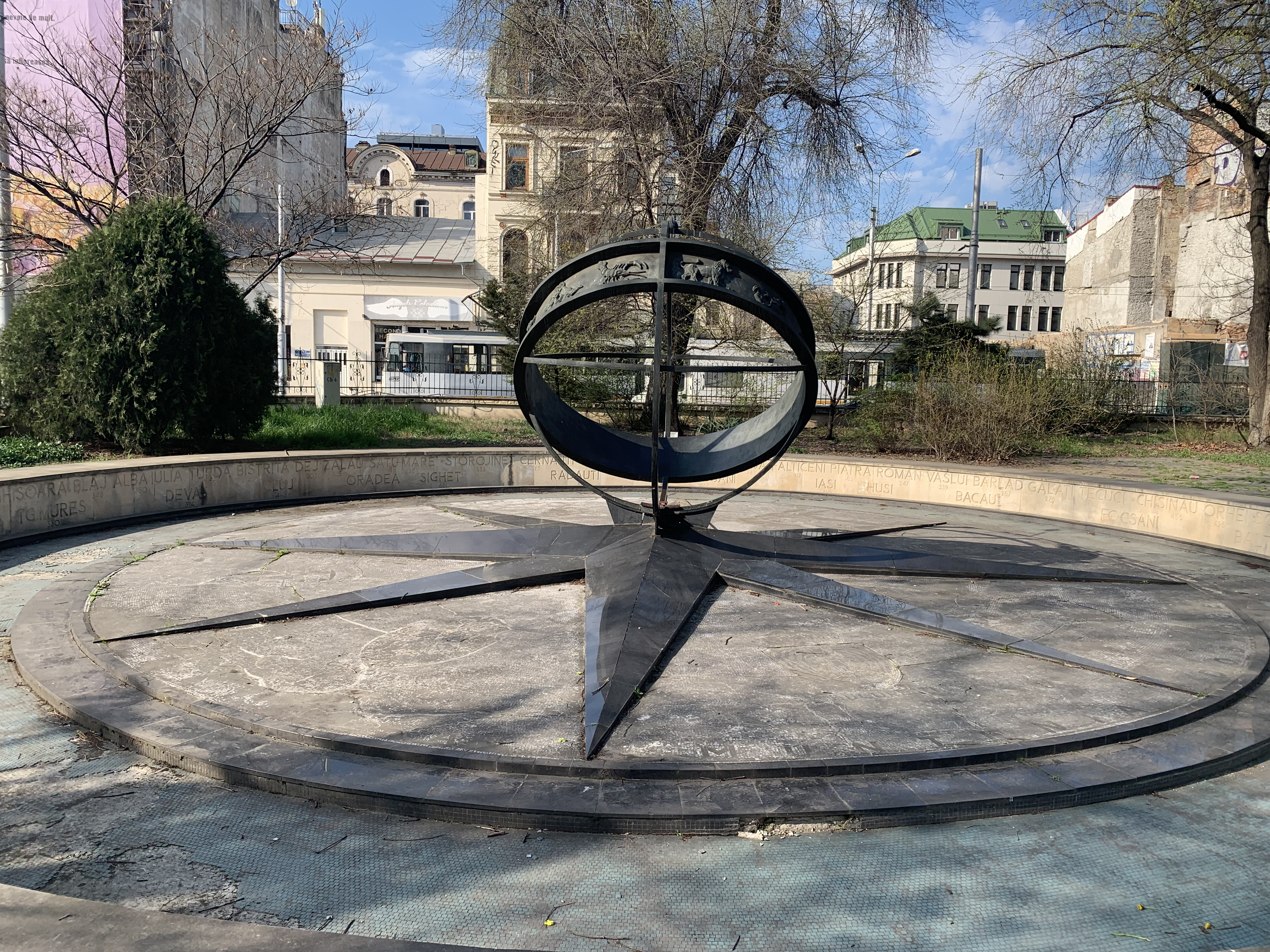
The Kilometer Zero monument

The Kilometer Zero monument (Romanian: Kilometrul Zero) located in central Bucharest, Romania, in front of the New St. George Church. It was created in 1938 by the sculptor Constantin Baraschi, based on plans drawn by architect Horia Creangă.

The distances from Bucharest to other cities in Romania are measured from this monument. It is divided into eight sections, each representing a Romanian historical province: Muntenia, Dobruja, Bessarabia, Moldavia, Bukovina, Transylvania, Banat, and Oltenia. Among the cities inscribed on it are also Cahul, Chișinău, Orhei, and Tighina (which are currently in the Republic of Moldova), Cernăuți, Cetatea Albă, Ismail, and Storojineț (now in Ukraine), as well as Bazargic and Silistra (now in Bulgaria), which were part of Greater Romania before World War II.

== See also ==
- Kilometre Zero
