= Pârvu Mutu =

Romanian artist

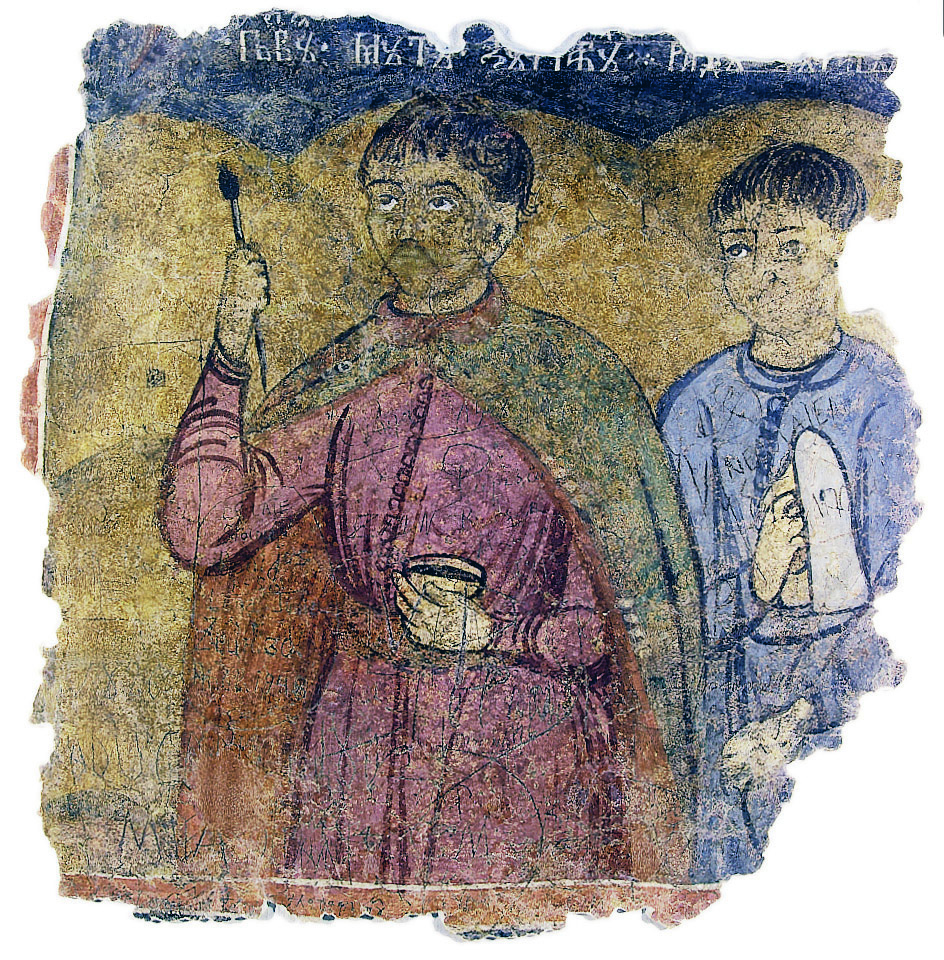

Pârvu Mutu (Pârvu the Mute, nickname of Pârvu Pârvescu; 1657–1735) was a Wallachian Romanian muralist and church painter.

He was born in the town of Câmpulung as the sixth son of the Orthodox priest Ioan Pârvescu, and began his career as a church painter at the age of 12. He lived some 40 years in Moldavia, returning to Wallachia in 1702. In 1718 he retired to the Mărgineni Monastery, the place where he died.

Pârvu Mutu painted in fresco style the interiors of churches in Mărgineni, Măgureni, Cotroceni, Călinești, Aninoasa, Fiindenii Doamnei, Colțea, Bordești, Filipeștii de Pădure, and the New St. George Church in Bucharest. Many of his works were commissioned by the Cantacuzino family.

He is mostly remembered for his portraits and his frescoes of church founders.
