= Ciolanu Monastery =

Eastern Orthodox monastery in Romania

Coordinates: 45°14′14″N 26°32′41″E

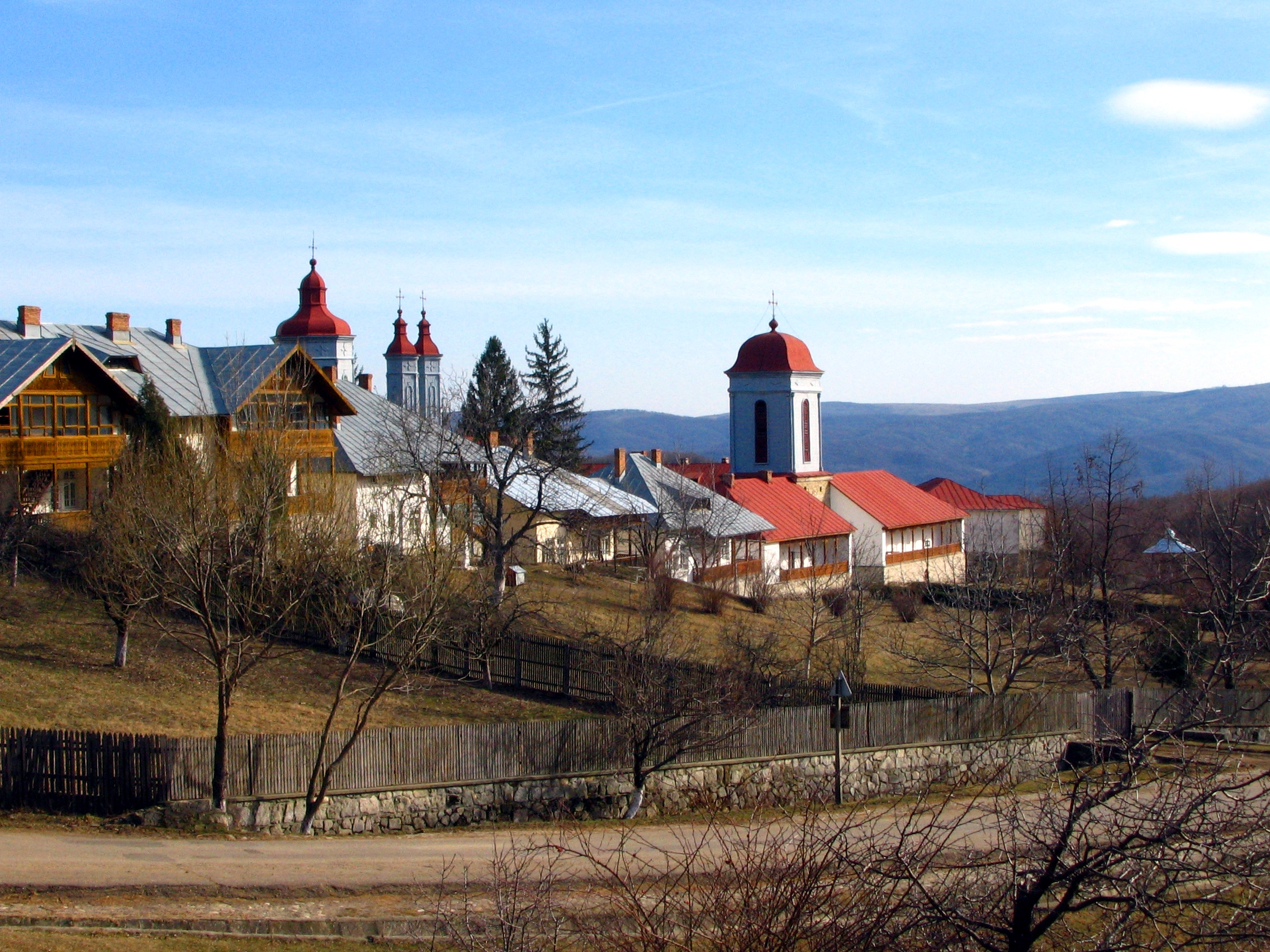
Ciolanu Monastery

Ciolanu Monastery is a monastery of Eastern Orthodox monks, located in Tisău commune, Buzău County, Romania. It was erected around 1570 by Dumitru Ciolanu, a boyar from Buzău, whose name it bears, together with the Sorescu boyar family from the nearby Vernești commune.

The compound contains a museum with icons painted by Gheorghe Tattarescu, as well as religious artifacts.
