= Gheorghe Tattarescu =

Romanian artist (1818–1894)

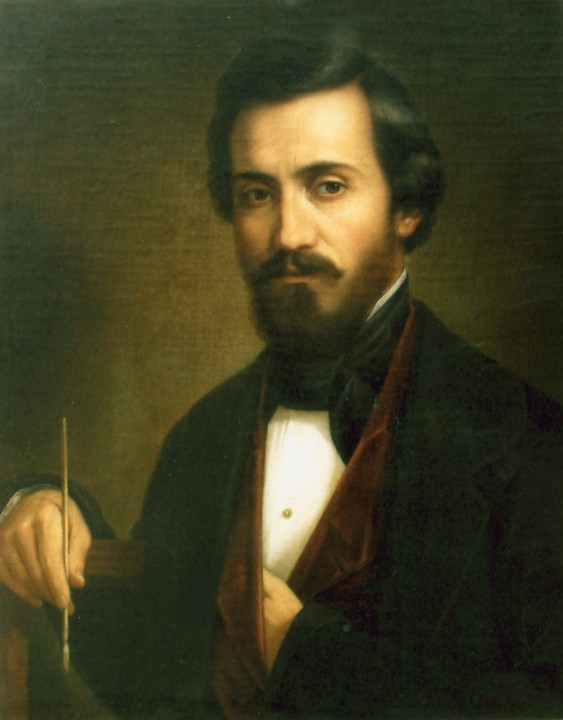
- Self-portrait (1849)
- Born: October 1818; Focşani, Principality of Moldavia
- Died: October 24, 1894; Bucharest, Kingdom of Romania
- Known for: Painting, mural
- Movement: Neoclassicism

Gheorghe Tattarescu (Romanian pronunciation: [ˈɡe̯orɡe tataˈresku]; October 1818 – October 24, 1894) was a Romanian painter and a pioneer of neoclassicism in his country's modern painting.

== Biography ==
=== Early life and studies ===
Tattarescu was born in Focşani in 1818. He began as an apprentice to his uncle Nicolae Teodorescu, a church painter. He studied at the Painting School from Buzău, when Teodorescu moved there. The Orthodox Bishop of Buzău, Chesarie Căpățână, helped him obtain a scholarship in Rome, where he was taught by professors from the Accademia di San Luca. While there, Tattarescu made copies of paintings by Raphael, Bartolomé Estéban Murillo, Salvatore Rosa, and Guido Reni.

=== Political activities ===
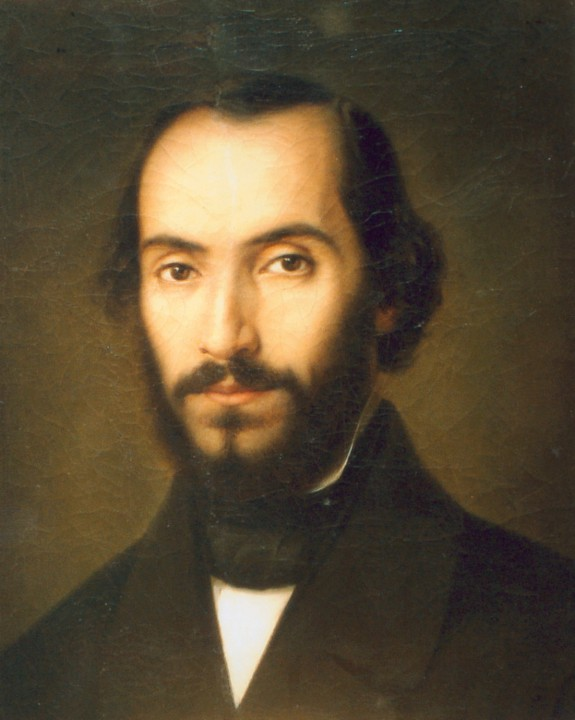
Portrait of Nicolae Bălcescu (1851)

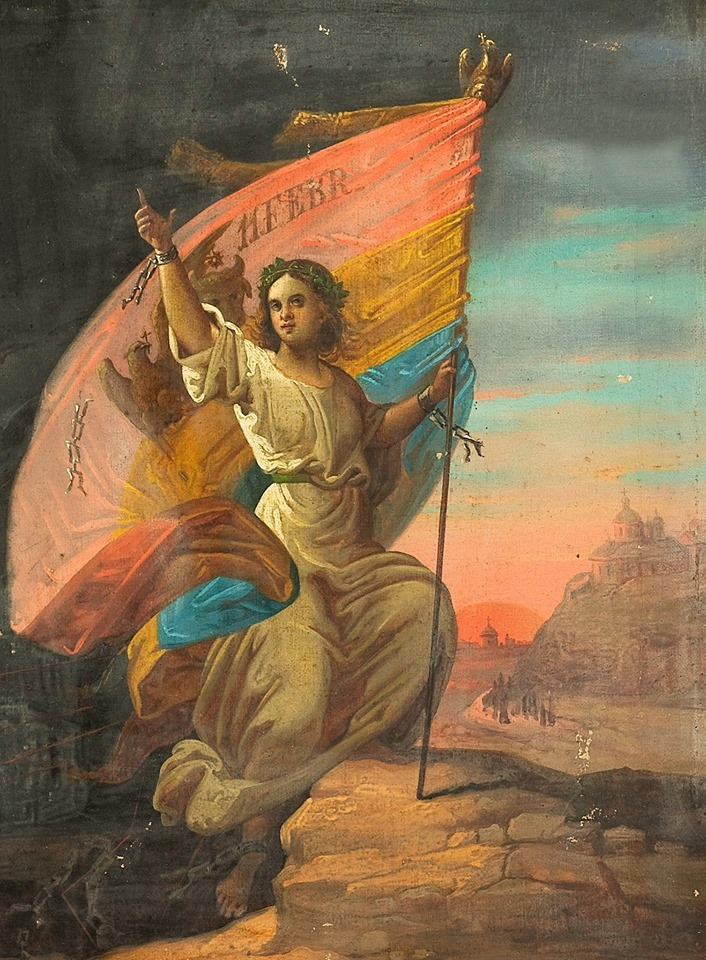
February 11, 1866 – The Modern Romania

Tattarescu was a participant in the 1848 Revolution in Wallachia. After the revolution, he painted portraits of Romanian revolutionaries in exile such as Gheorghe Magheru, Ştefan Golescu, and, in 1851, that of Nicolae Bălcescu (in three almost identical versions). Romantic nationalist ideals were the inspiration for his allegorical compositions with revolutionary themes in Romania's rebirth (1849), the patriotic Principalities' Unification (1857) and February 11 – The Modern Romania (1866).

=== Later life and legacy ===
In 1860, being commissioned to draw up a National Album of sights and historical monuments of the country, his talent of painting vaguely Romantic landscapes became highly valued. At the same time, showing his sympathy with various peasant uprisings, he painted The peasant at the Danube in 1875. He was also commissioned to decorate several churches in a neoclassical manner.

In 1864, together with painter Theodor Aman, Tattarescu founded the National School of Fine Arts in Bucharest. He was a professor there for a long time after, and served as the School's Director for two years (1891–1892).

In 1865, he wrote Useful Principles and Studies on Proportions of the Human Body and Drawing after the Most Famous Painters.

Tattarescu died in Bucharest. The house he bought in 1855 and lived in for almost 40 years is now home to the Gheorghe Tattarescu Memorial Museum. It was opened 1951, and hosts several of his original works of art.

== Gallery ==
Click on an image to view it enlarged.

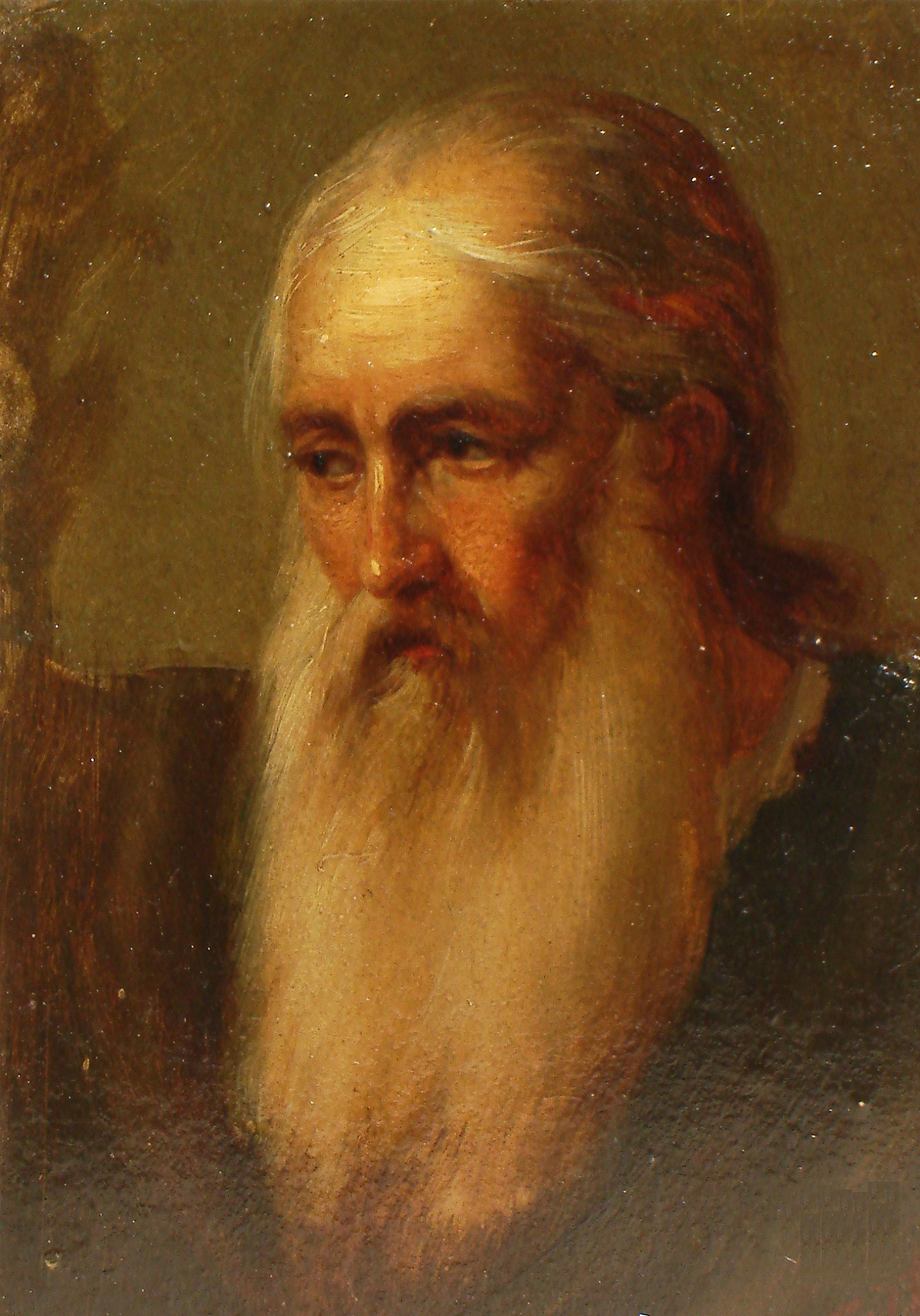
Old monk

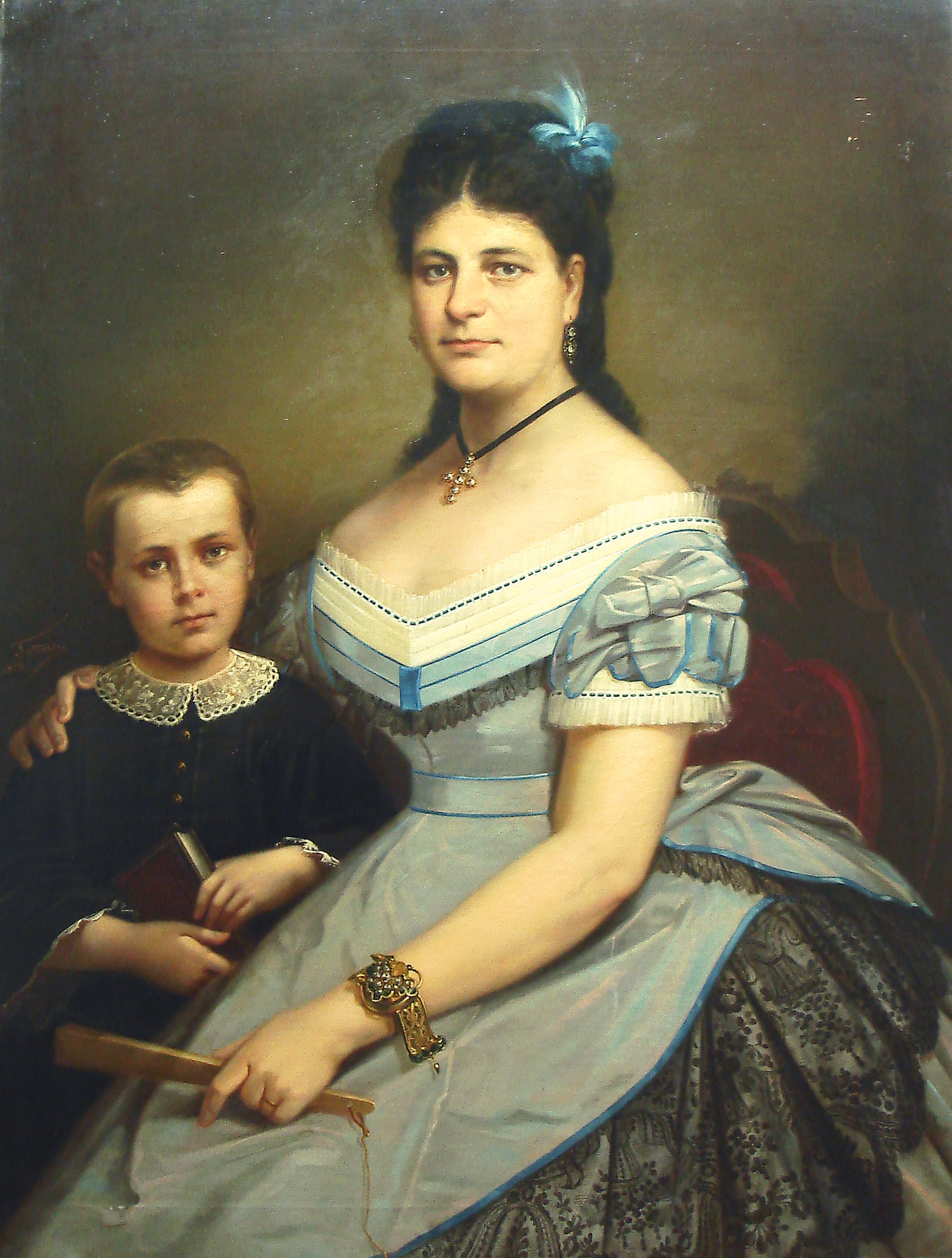
Painter's wife and his son

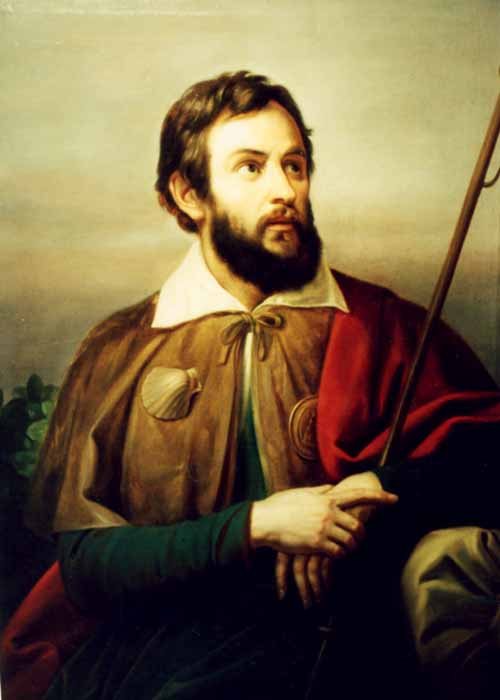
Pilgrim

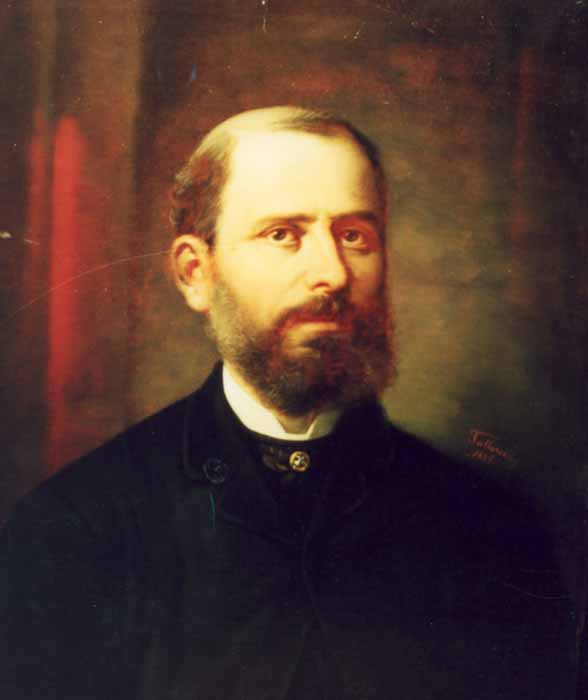
Portrait of Ion Grădişteanu

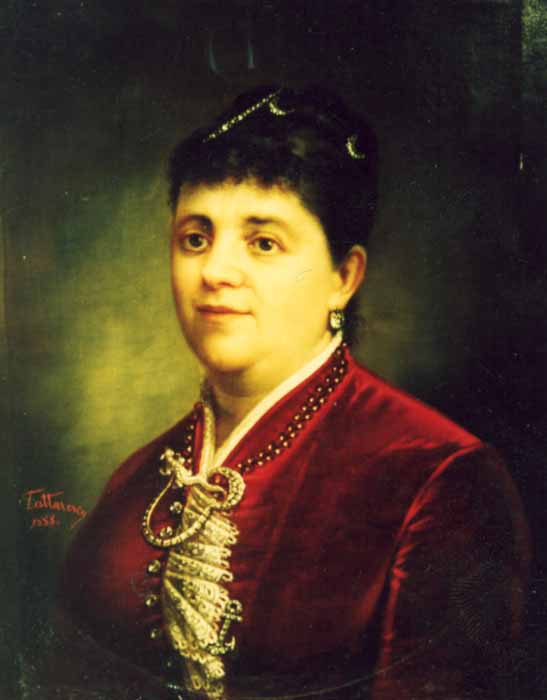
Portrait of Maria Grădişteanu

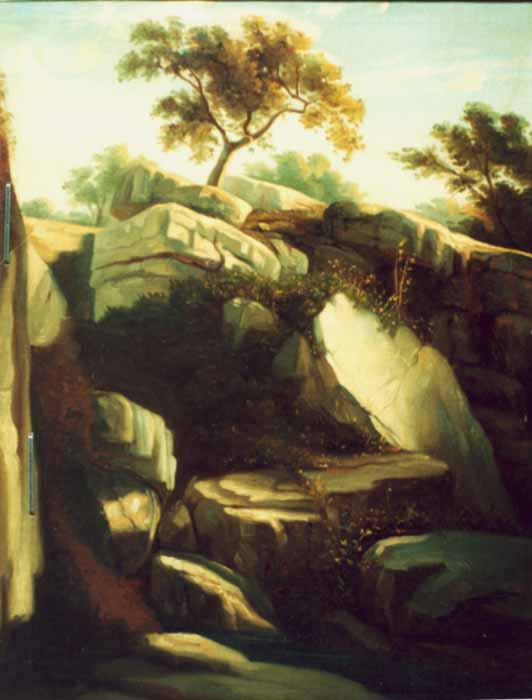
Landscape from Italy

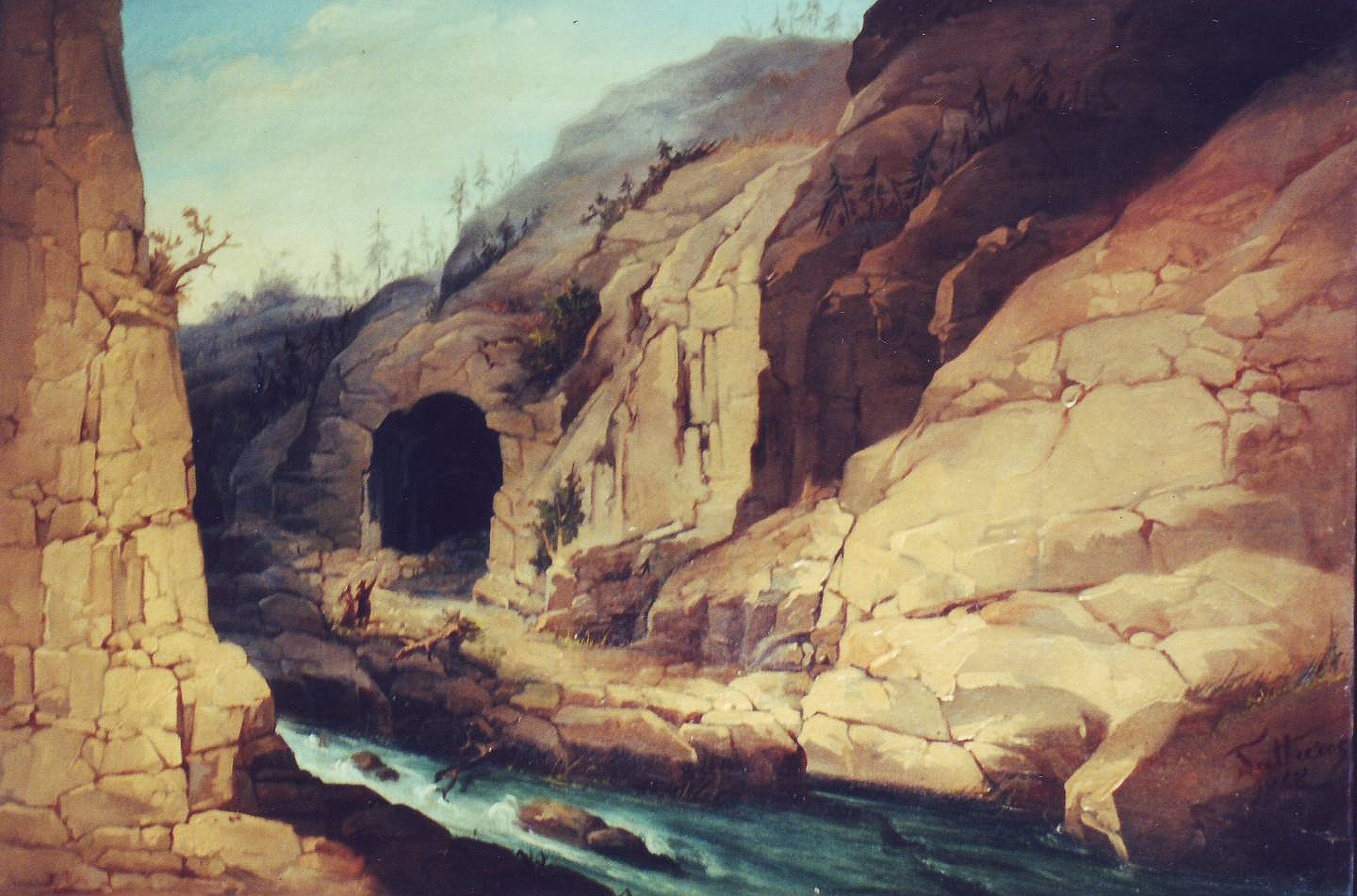
Dâmbovicioara cave

== See also ==
- Metropolitan Cathedral, Iaşi

== Notes ==
Elena Ene D(raghici)-Vasilescu, Icoanǎ şi iconari în Romȃnia: cȃt Bizanț, cȃt Occident? Doxologia, Iaşi, 2009; reprinted Iaşi, Trinitas, 2015; chapter IV is dedicated to Gheorghe Tattarescu, pp. 111–136

Elena Ene D(raghici)-Vasilescu, Between Tradition and Modernity: Icons and Iconographers in Romania, Saarbrücken: VDM (Verlag Dr. Müller), 2009; in English; chapter IV is dedicated to Gheorghe Tattarescu; pp. 104–129
