= Vernești =

- Commune
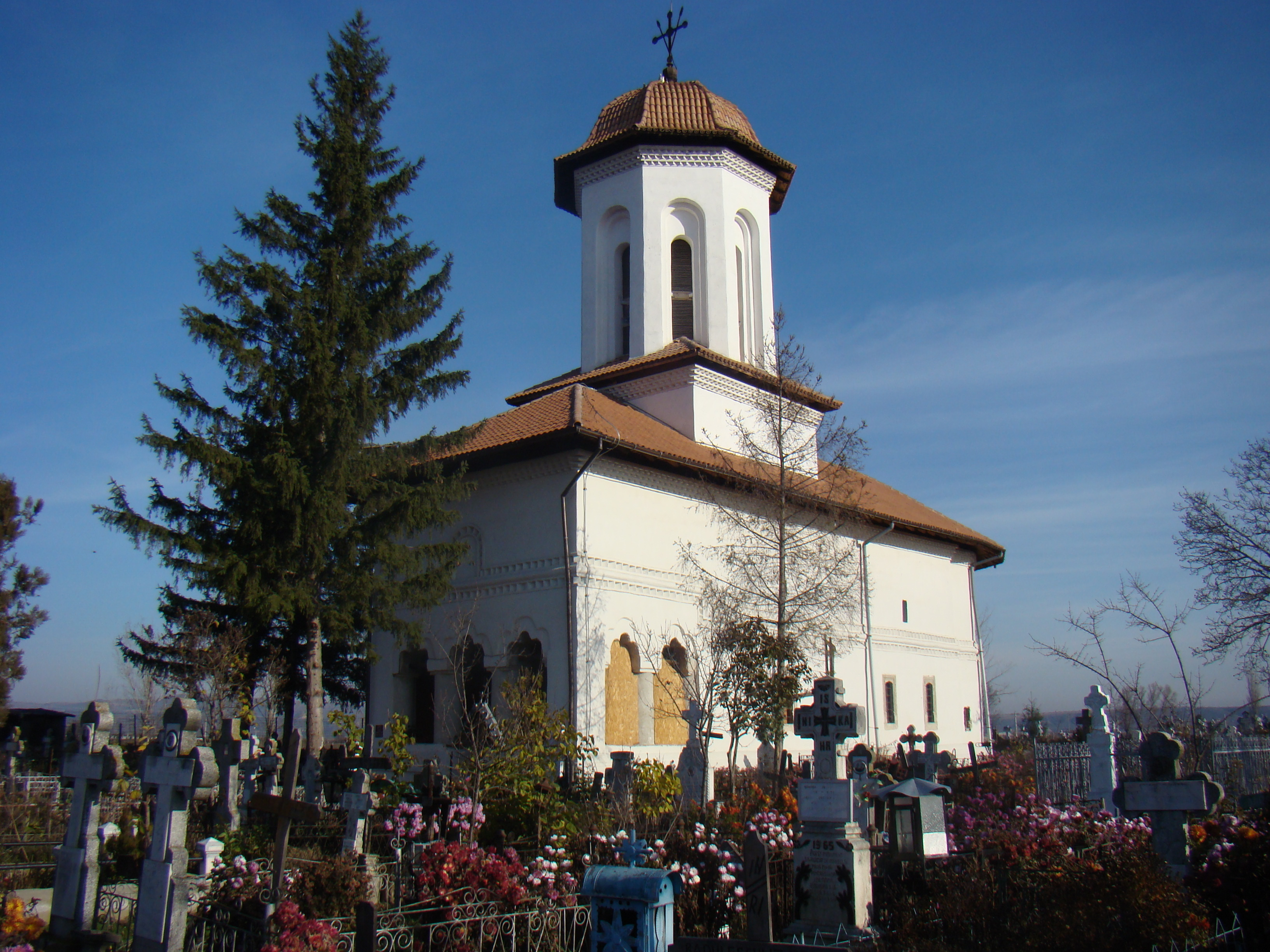
- Church of the Annunciation in Vernești village

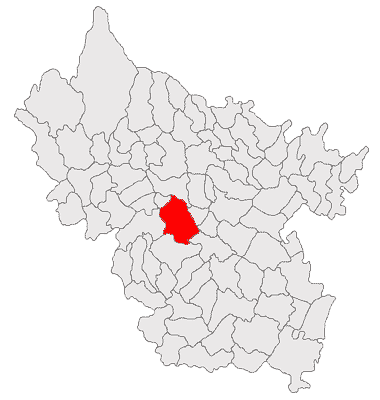
- Location in Buzău County

- Location in Romania
- Coordinates: 45°13′N 26°43′E
- Country: Romania
- County: Buzău
- Subdivisions: Brădeanca, Cândești, Cârlomănești, Mierea, Nenciu, Nișcov, Săsenii Noi, Săsenii Vale, Săsenii Vechi, Vernești, Zorești

Government
  - Mayor (2020–2024): Daniel Năstase (PSD)
- Area: 91.74 km^{2} (35.42 sq mi)
- Elevation: 122 m (400 ft)
- Population (2021-12-01): 9,008
  - Density: 98.19/km^{2} (254.3/sq mi)
- Time zone: UTC+02:00 (EET)
  - Summer (DST): UTC+03:00 (EEST)
- Postal code: 127675–127677, 127681–127687
- Area code: +(40) 238
- Vehicle reg.: BZ
- Website: primariavernestibuzau.ro

Vernești (Romanian pronunciation: [verˈneʃtʲ]) is a commune in Buzău County, Muntenia, Romania. It is located just north-west of the county capital, Buzău, along the national road DN10, which links Buzău with Brașov. The commune is composed of eleven villages: Brădeanca, Cândești, Cârlomănești, Mierea, Nenciu, Nișcov, Săsenii Noi, Săsenii Vale, Săsenii Vechi, Vernești, and Zorești.

A Bronze Age grave was discovered in Cârlomănești village.

Historical population
Year	Pop.	±%
2002	8,698	—
2011	8,633	−0.7%
2021	9,008	+4.3%
Source: Census data
