= Lacul Lebedelor =

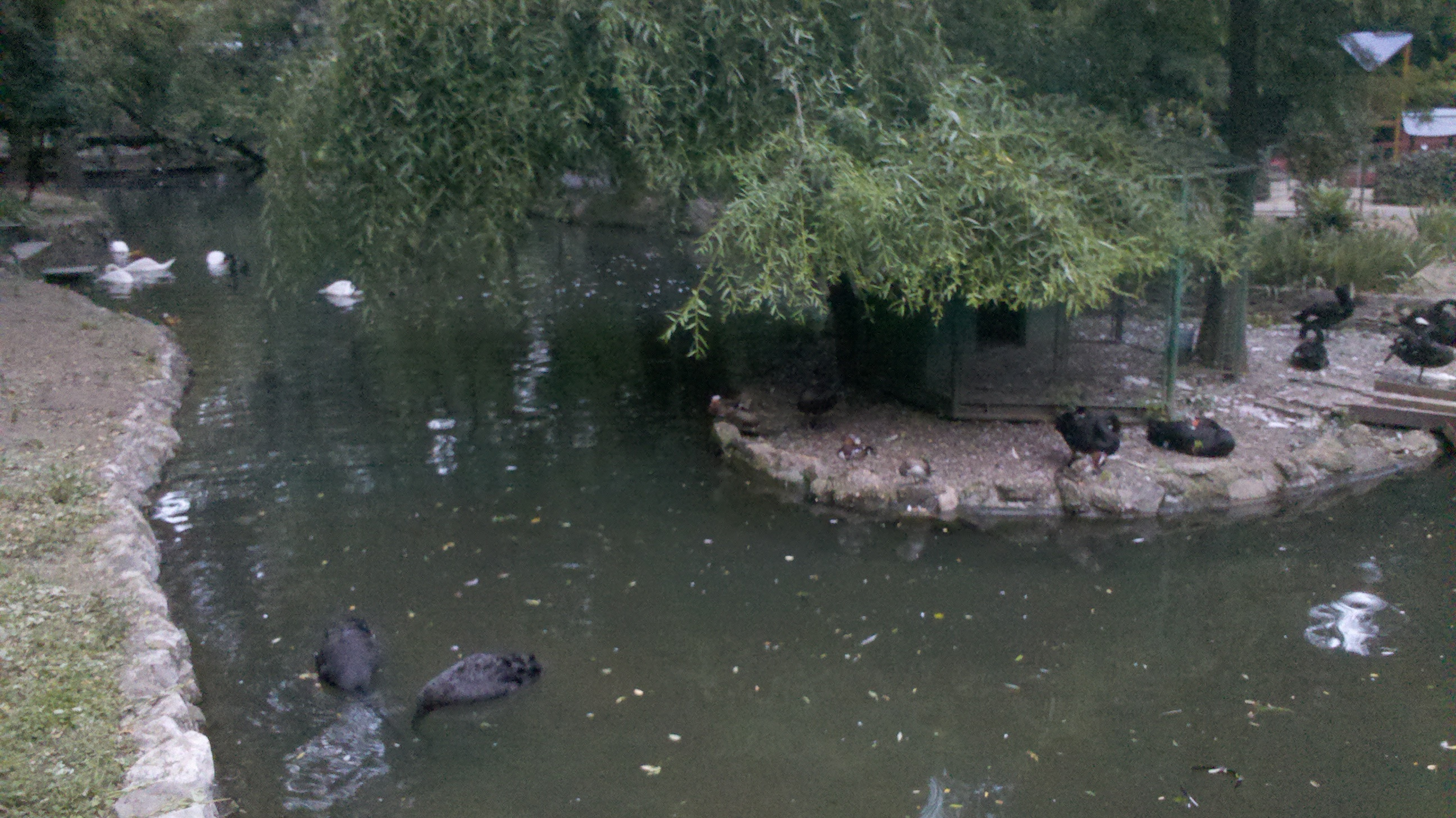

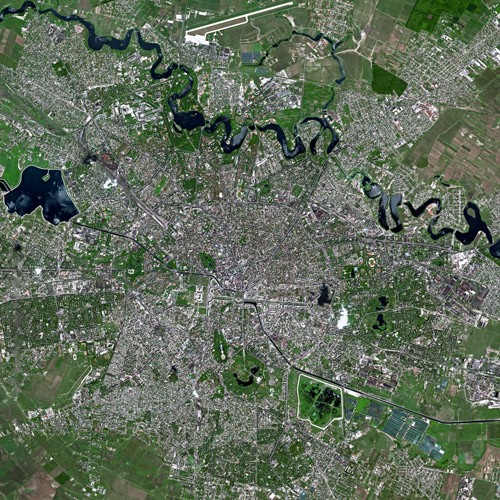
- Location within Bucharest, Romania
- Location: Sector 1, Bucharest
- Coordinates: 44.439138°N 26.089031°E
- Basin countries: Romania
- Max. length: 100 m (330 ft)
- Max. width: 15 m (49 ft)

Lacul Lebedelor ("Swan Lake") is an artificial lake in the center of Bucharest, Sector 1, in Cișmigiu Gardens, close to Lake Cișmigiu. It is reserved to water birds. Over 90 species of birds and animals can be seen on another lake in Bucharest, Lake Văcărești.

== See also ==
- List of lakes in Bucharest
