= Baranga (river) =

- Location within Romania

Location
- Country: Romania
- Counties: Dâmbovița County
- Villages: Cornățelu, Alunișu

Physical characteristics
- Mouth: Colentina
  - location: Ghimpați
  - coordinates: 44.6544°N 25.7855°E
- Length: 44 km (27 mi)
- Basin size: 112 km^{2} (43 sq mi)

Basin features
- Progression: Colentina→ Dâmbovița→ Argeș→ Danube→ Black Sea

The Baranga is a left tributary of the river Colentina in Romania. It discharges into the Colentina in Ghimpați. Its length is 44 km (27 mi) and its basin size is 112 km^{2} (43 sq mi).
