= Lake Pantelimon =

Reservoir in Sector, Bucharest

Lake Pantelimon Lacul Pantelimon
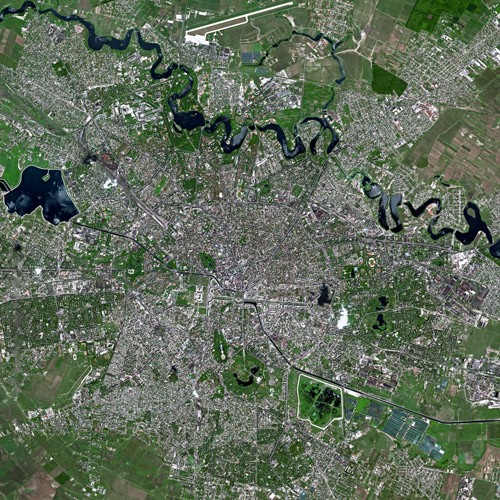
- Location within Bucharest, Romania
- Location: Sector 2, Bucharest
- Coordinates: 44.435540°N 26.222585°E
- Type: reservoir
- Primary inflows: Colentina River
- Primary outflows: Colentina River
- Basin countries: Romania
- Max. length: 3 km (1.9 mi)
- Max. width: 500 m (1,600 ft)
- Surface area: 260 ha (640 acres)
- Max. depth: 5 m (16 ft)
- Water volume: 16,000,000 m^{3} (13,000 acre⋅ft)

Lake Pantelimon is an anthropic lake located in the northern part of the city of Bucharest, developed on the Colentina River, in the area where it flows through the urban area of the city, situated between Lake Cernica upstream and Lake Dobroești downstream.

== See also ==
- List of lakes in Bucharest
