= List of lakes of Bucharest =

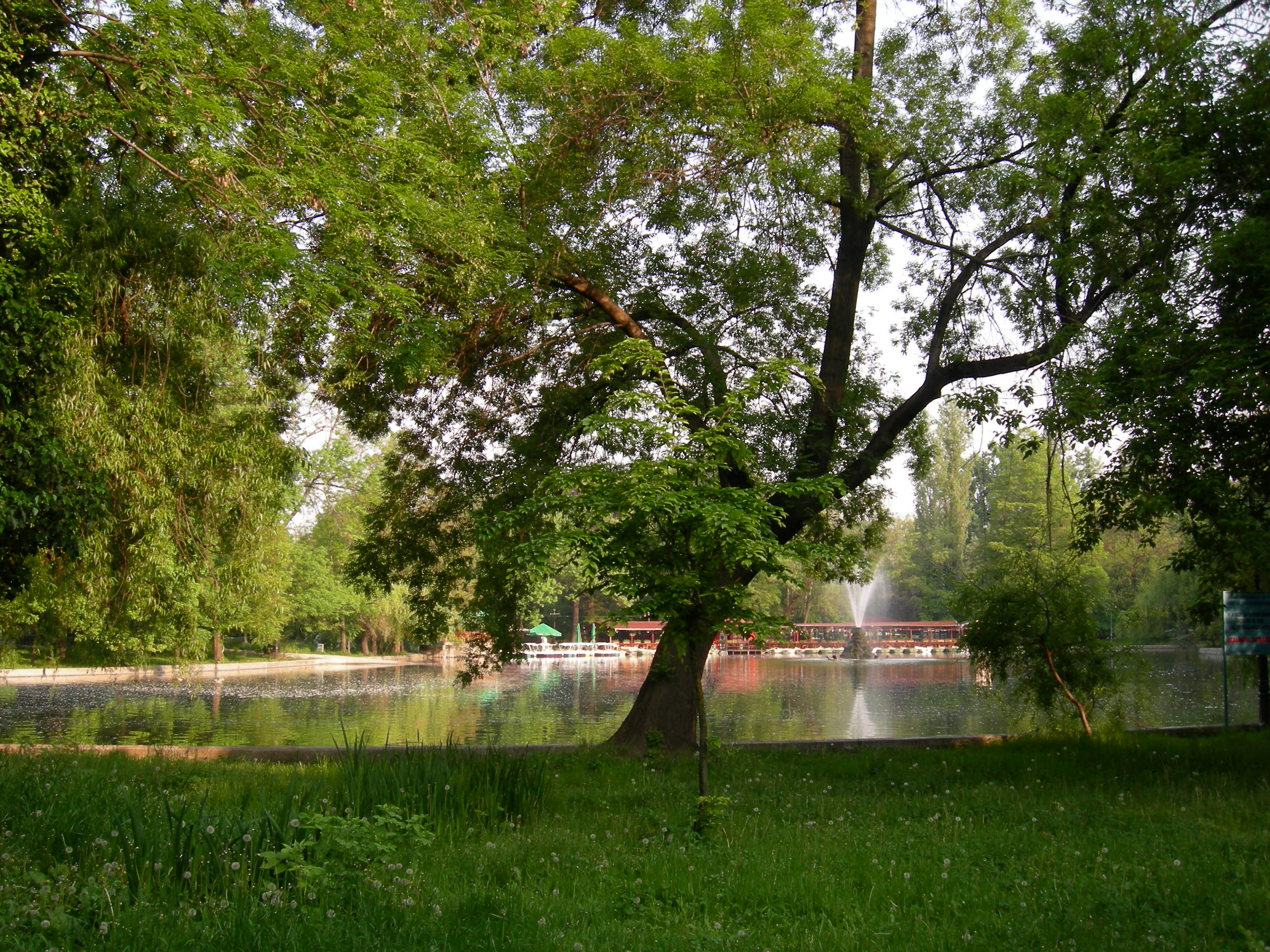
Lake Cișmigiu

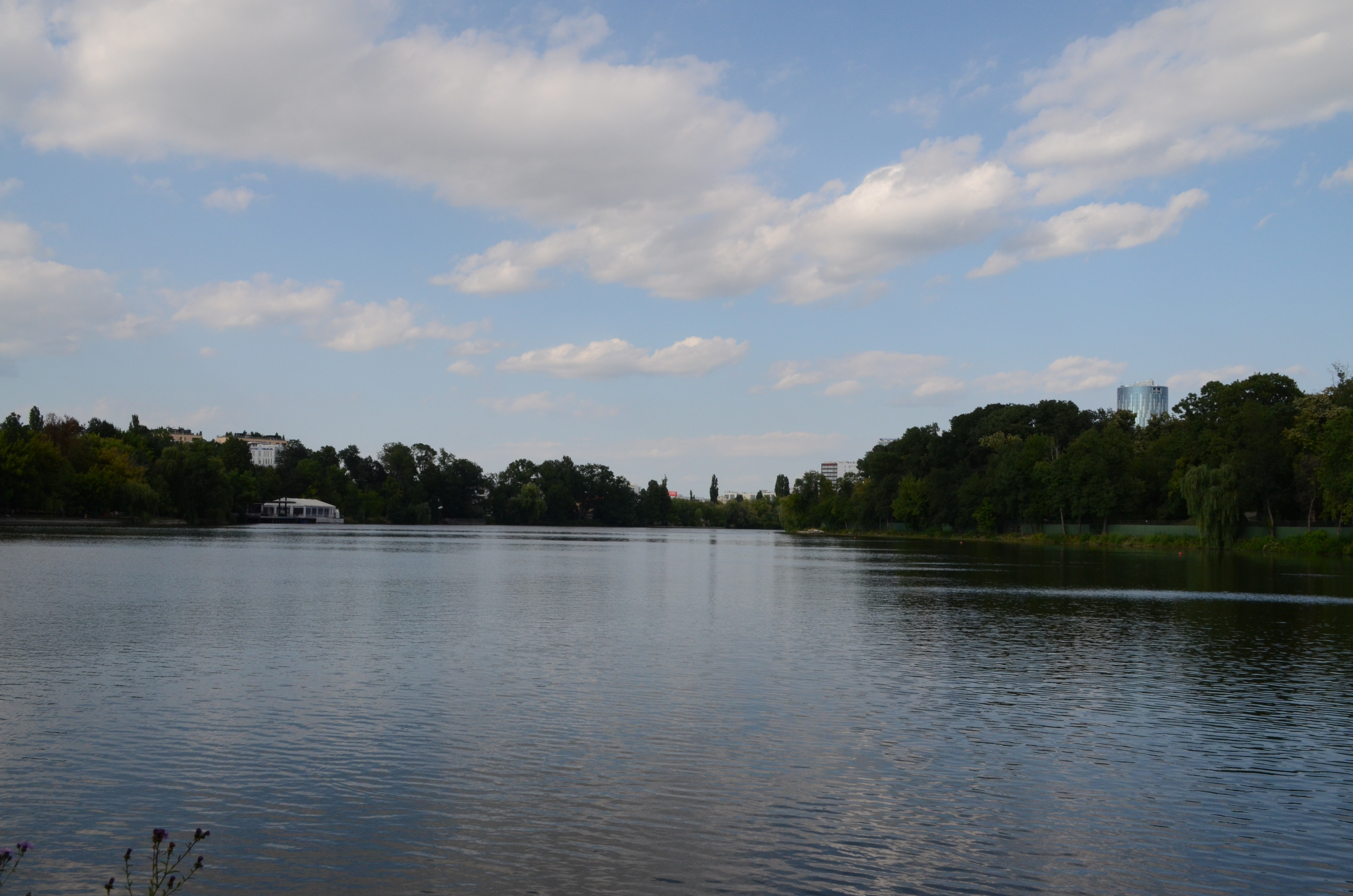
Lake Floreasca

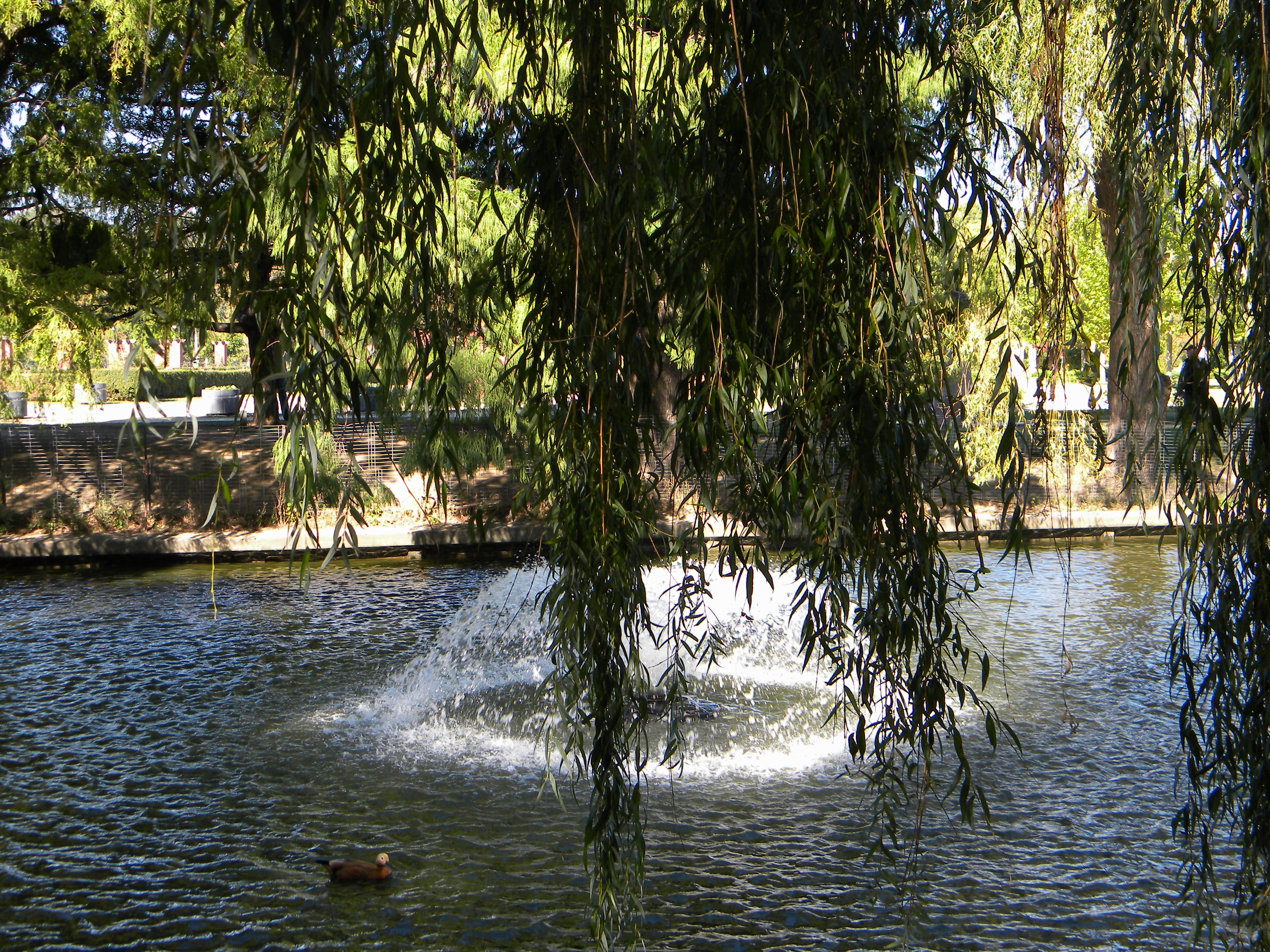
Lake Herăstrău

The Lakes, Parks and Leisure Administration in Bucharest (Romanian: Administrația Lacuri, Parcuri și Agrement) has under its upkeep nine lakes and nine dams, from the total of 15 located on the Colentina River, that started to be built since 1936 and that cover a total area of 1,153.98 ha (2,851.5 acres) and have a combined volume of 29,571,000 m^{3} (1.0443×10^{9} cu ft). The largest lake inside Bucharest, in terms of surface area, is the Lake Morii, other large lakes with banks in Bucharest or parts in Bucharest are the Lake Cernica that has an area of 341 ha (840 acres); and the largest in terms of volume is Lake Pantelimon with a volume of 12,300,000 m^{3} (430,000,000 cu ft). The oldest manmade lake in Bucharest is the Herăstrău Lake, which was completed in 1936; this lake also has the oldest sluice in the city, built between 1933 and 1936, and finalized in 2007.

== List of lakes ==
Lake Băneasa is located in Sectorul 1; it has a length of 3 km (1.9 mi), a width between 50 m (160 ft) and 400 m (1,300 ft), a surface area of 40 ha (99 acres), a depth between 1 m (3 ft 3 in) and 3 m (9.8 ft), a volume of 630,000 m^{3} (22,000,000 cu ft) and a debit of 2.5 m/s (8.2 ft/s).

Lake Cișmigiu is located in Sectorul 1; it has a length of 1.3 km (0.81 mi), a width of 50 m (160 ft), a surface area of 2.65 ha (6.5 acres), a depth between 1 m (3 ft 3 in) and 2 m (6 ft 7 in), and a volume of 290,000 m^{3} (10,000,000 ft^{3}).

Lake Colentina is located in Sectorul 2; it has a length of 1.3 km (0.81 mi), a width of 100–500 m (330–1,640 ft), a surface area of 29 ha (72 acres), a depth between 1 m (3 ft 3 in) and 5 m (16 ft), and a volume of 600,000 m^{3} (21,000,000 cu ft).

Lake Dâmbovița is located in Sectorul 6; it has a length of 200 m (660 ft), a width of 400 m (1,300 ft), a surface area of 55 ha (140 acres), an average depth of 3 m (9.8 ft), and a volume of 2,000,000 m^{3} (71,000,000 cu ft).

Lake Fundeni is located in Sectorul 2; it has a length of 2.1 km (1.3 mi), a width of 200–800 m (660–2,620 ft), a surface area of 35 ha (86 acres), a depth between 1 m (3 ft 3 in) and 5 m (16 ft), and a volume of 800,000 m^{3} (28,000,000 cu ft).

Lake Floreasca is located in Sectorul 1; it has a length of 3 km (1.9 mi), a width between 100 m (330 ft) and 800 m (2,600 ft), a surface area of 70 ha (170 acres), a depth between 1 m (3 ft 3 in) and 5 m (16 ft), a volume of 1,600,000 m^{3} (57,000,000 cu ft) and a debit of 2.5 m/s (8.2 ft/s).

Lake Grivița is located in Sectorul 1; it has a length of 3.8 km (2.4 mi), a width between 50 m (160 ft) and 500 m (1,600 ft), a surface area of 53 ha (130 acres), a depth between 1 m (3 ft 3 in) and 4 m (13 ft), a volume of 1,000,000 m^{3} (35,000,000 cu ft), and a debit of 2.5 m/s (8.2 ft/s).

Lake Herăstrău is located in Sectorul 1; it has a length of 3.5 km (2.2 mi), a surface area of 77 ha (190 acres), and a volume of 2,390,000 m^{3} (84,000,000 cu ft).

Lacul Lebedelor is a small lake located close to Lake Cișmigiu in Sectorul 1 and reserved for water birds.

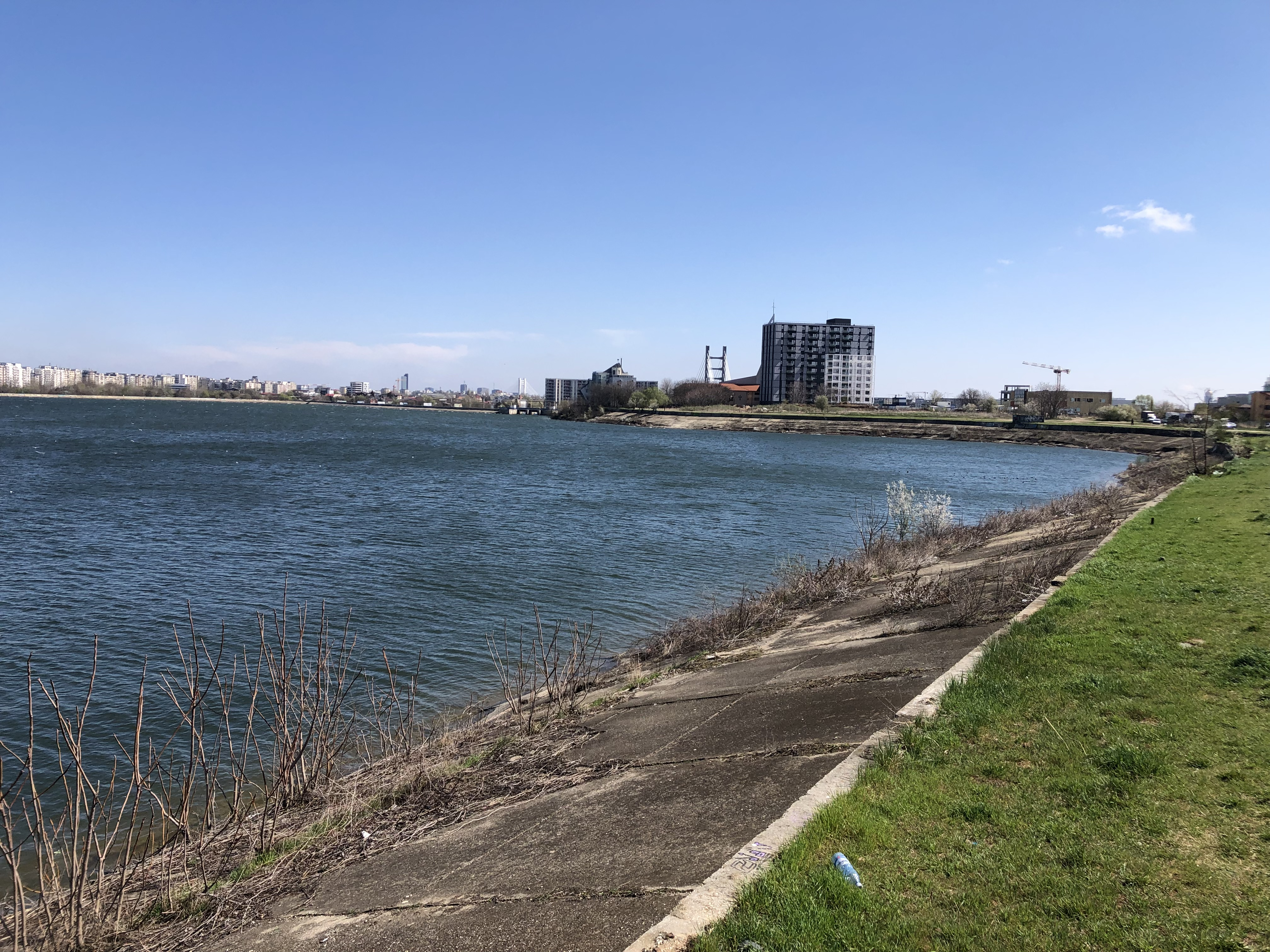
Lacul Morii

Lacul Morii ("Mill Lake") is the largest lake in Bucharest. Located in Sectorul 6, it has a length of 7 km (4.3 mi), a surface area of 246 ha (610 acres), a maximum depth of 6 m (20 ft), and a volume of 14,700,000 m^{3} (520,000,000 cu ft).

Lake Pantelimon is located in Sectorul 2 and covers a surface of 260 ha (640 acres), but most of the lake is outside Bucharest, in Pantelimon.

Lake Plumbuita is located in Sectorul 2.

Lake Străulești is located in Sectorul 1, it has a length of 2.3 km (1.4 mi), a width between 100 m (330 ft) and 300 m (980 ft), a surface area of 33 ha (82 acres), a depth between 1 m (3.3 ft) and 5 m (16 ft), and a volume of 700,000 m^{3} (25,000,000 cu ft).

Lake Tineretului is located in Tineretului Park; it has an average depth of 1.5 m (4 ft 11 in), covers a surface of 13.5 ha (33 acres), and a volume of 200,000 m^{3} (7,100,000 cu ft).

Lake Tei (Linden Tree Lake) is located in Tei Park, in the Tei neighborhood; it has a length of 2.5 km (1.6 mi), a surface area of 80 ha (200 acres), and a volume of 2,000,000 m^{3} (71,000,000 cu ft).

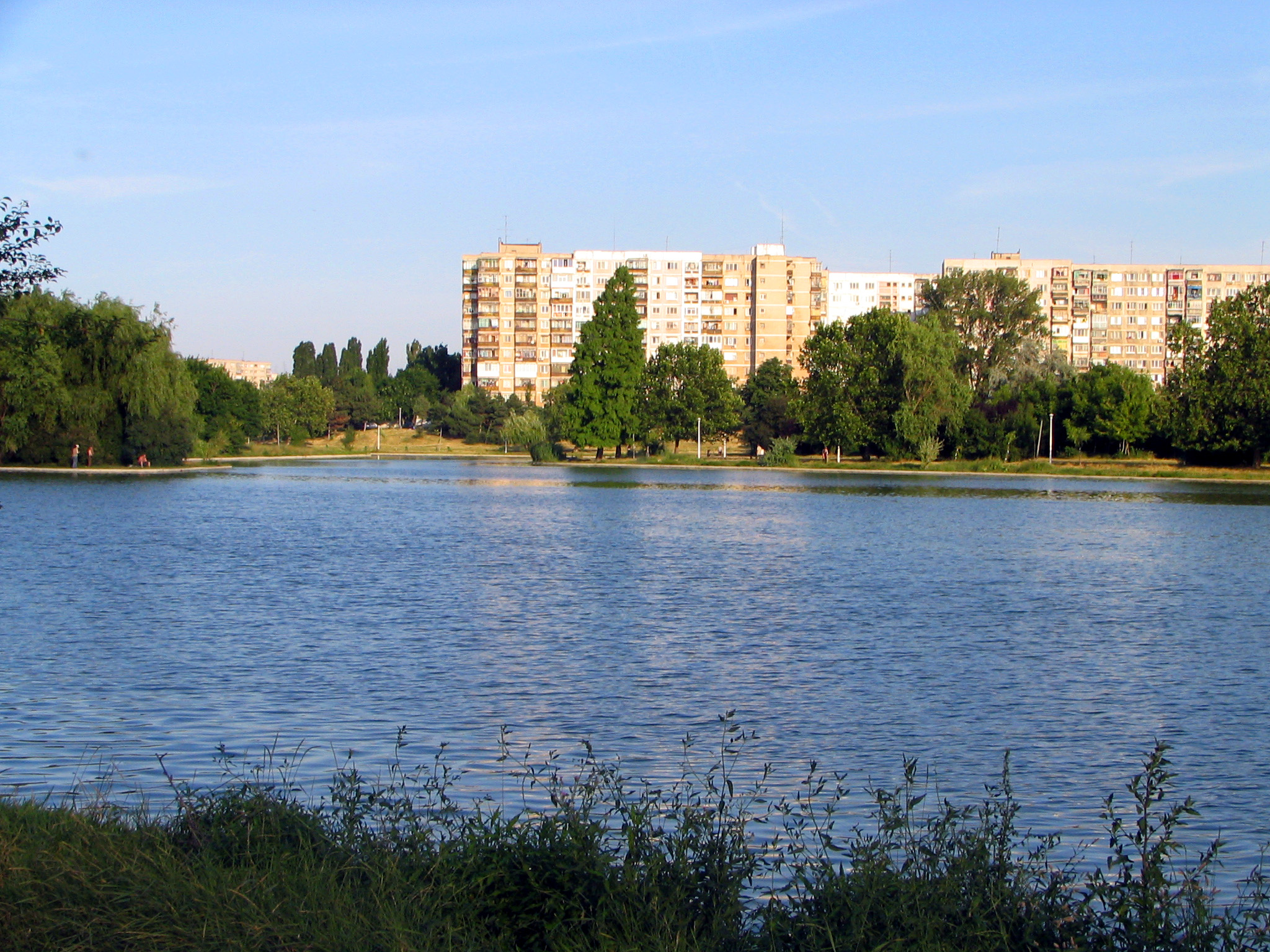
Lake Titan

Lake Titan is in Titan Park; it covers a surface of 85 ha (210 acres).

Lake Văcărești is located in Sectorul 4 and covers a surface of 189 ha (470 acres).

Other lakes include Dobroești, the lake from Drumul Taberei Park, and the lake from Carol Park.
