= Lake Grivița =

Lake Grivița Lacul Grivița
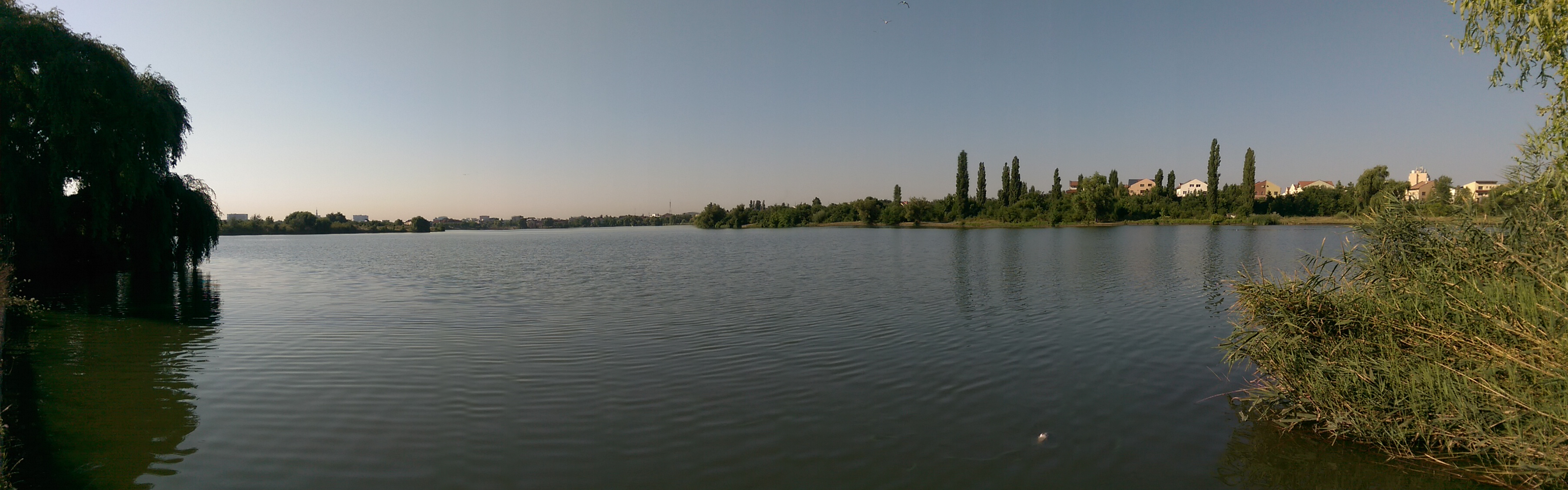

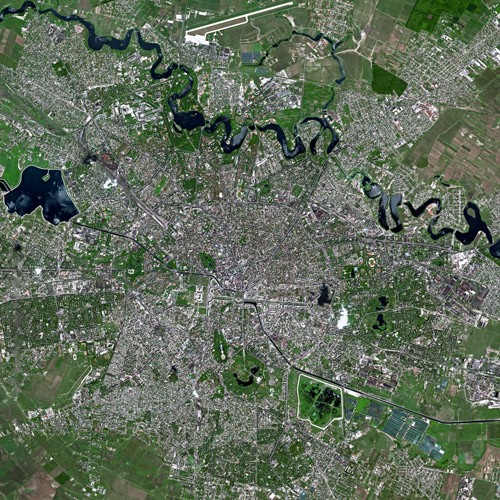
- Location within Bucharest, Romania
- Location: Sector 1, Bucharest
- Coordinates: 44.497485°N 26.046714°E
- Type: reservoir
- Primary inflows: Colentina River
- Primary outflows: Colentina River
- Basin countries: Romania
- Max. length: 3.8 km (2.4 mi)
- Max. width: 500 m (1,600 ft)
- Surface area: 53 ha (130 acres)
- Max. depth: 5 m (16 ft)
- Water volume: 1,000,000 m^{3} (810 acre⋅ft)

Lake Grivița is an anthropic lake located in the northern part of the city of Bucharest, developed on the Colentina River, in the area where it flows through the urban area of the city, situated between Lake Străulești upstream and Lake Băneasa downstream.

== See also ==
- List of lakes in Bucharest
