= Lake Herăstrău =

Lake Herăstrău Lacul Herăstrău
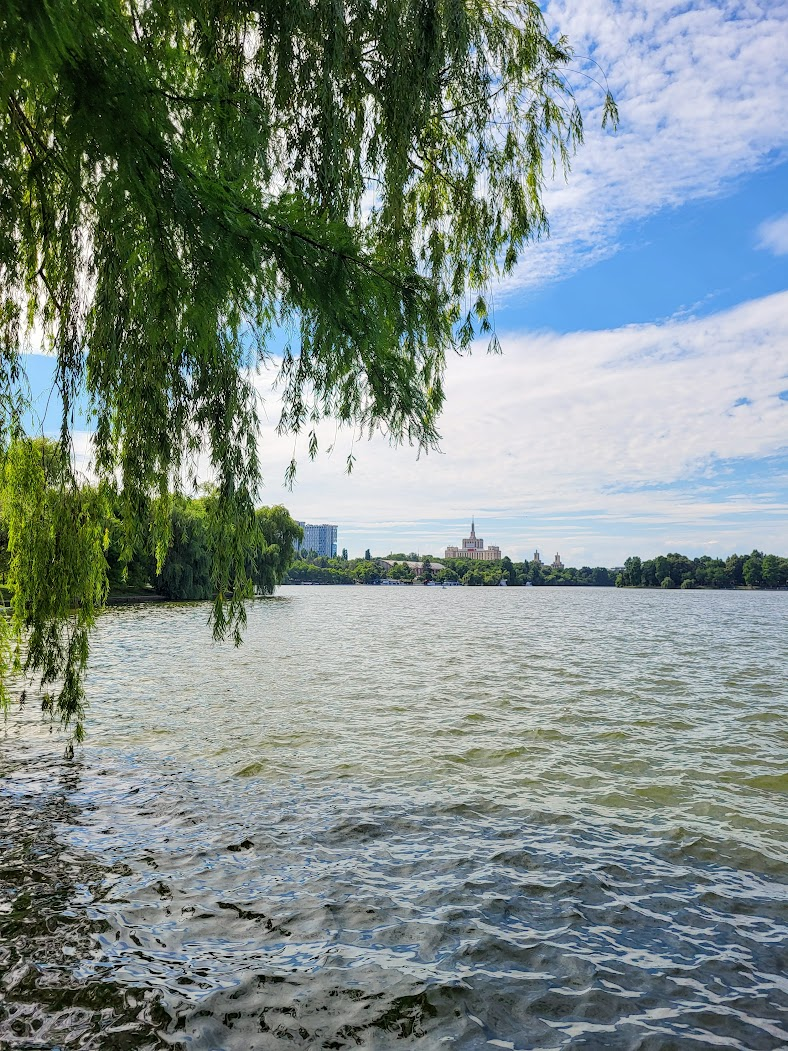
- View on the lake with House of the Free Press

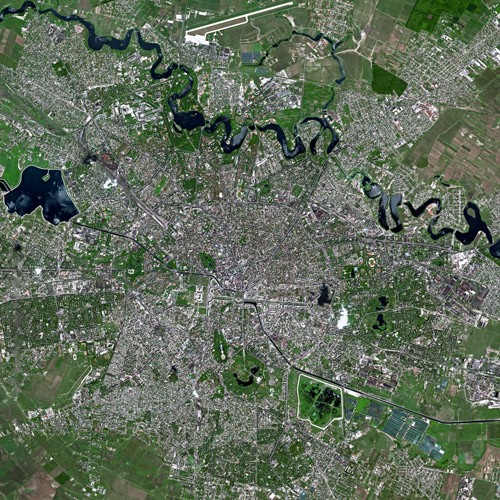
- Location within Bucharest, Romania
- Location: Sector 1, Bucharest
- Coordinates: 44.47532°N 26.08207°E
- Type: reservoir
- Primary inflows: Colentina River
- Primary outflows: Colentina River
- Basin countries: Romania
- Max. length: 3.5 km (2.2 mi)
- Max. width: 500 m (1,600 ft)
- Surface area: 74 ha (180 acres)
- Max. depth: 5 m (16 ft)
- Water volume: 15,000,000 m^{3} (12,000 acre⋅ft)

Lake Herăstrău is an artificial lake located in the northern part of the city of Bucharest, developed on the Colentina River, in the area where it flows through the urban area of the city, situated between Lake Băneasa upstream and Lake Floreasca downstream. It is the biggest lake in Bucharest.

The length of the lake's shores is 7,400 meters, and the length of the islands on the lake is 1,600 meters. The normal retention level is 79.50 meters, with a surface area at NNR of 77 hectares. The length of the lake is 3.50 kilometers, and it has a water volume of approximately 1.5 million cubic meters. The lake is surrounded by King Michael I Park.

== Etymology ==
The name of Herăstrău comes from the popular form of the word ferăstrău, which means saw in Romanian. Near the lake, which was acquired by Șerban-Vodă Cantacuzino, there was a sawmill powered by the waters of the Colentina River. This sawmill proved to be profitable for the estate by providing wood for construction in the capital city.

== Lock ==
Lock between Lake Herăstrău and Lake Floreasca

The Herăstrău Lake Lock (Ecluza Lacului Herăstrău) was constructed between 1933 and 1936, replacing an old dam that had served a sawmill in the area.

This lock is located on the left bank of Lake Herăstrău and connects it to Lake Floreasca. Besides its recreational function, allowing boat travel between Lake Herăstrău and Lake Floreasca, the lock also serves as an additional drainage system for Lake Herăstrău into Lake Floreasca. This is particularly important during heavy rains when there is a risk of excessive water level rise in Lake Herăstrău, which could potentially pose a threat to areas in Bucharest.

The construction of the lock and its dual purpose, both for navigation and flood control, plays a significant role in the management of the water levels in this region.

== See also ==
- List of lakes in Bucharest
