= Colentina =

Colentina may refer to:

- Colentina (river), a tributary of the river Dâmboviţa in Bucharest
- Colentina, Bucharest, a neighborhood
- Colentina Hospital, Bucharest
