= Crevedia Solar Park =

Photovoltaic power stations in Romania

- Country: Romania
- Location: Crevedia
- Coordinates: 44°36′N 25°56′E
- Status: Under construction
- Commission date: December 2012
- Construction cost: €6 million

Solar farm
- Type: Flat-panel PV

Power generation
- Units operational: 8400
- Nameplate capacity: 2 MW
- Annual net output: 2.5 GWh

Crevedia Solar Park, a large thin-film photovoltaic (PV) power system, is on a 10 ha plot of land near the Crevedia commune in Romania. The power plant is a 2-megawatt solar power system using 8400 245 Wp panels of state-of-the-art thin film technology. The solar park is expected to supply 2,500 MWh of electricity per year. Construction began in March 2012 and was completed in December 2012.

The installation is in the Dâmbovița County in southern Romania. The investment cost for the Crevedia solar park is Euro 6 million.

== See also ==
- Renewable energy in the European Union
- Solar power in Romania
