= Grigore Băjenaru =

Romanian writer (1907–1986)

Grigore Popescu-Băjenaru (Romanian pronunciation: [ɡriˈɡore poˈpesku bəʒeˈnaru]; December 13, 1907 – February 5, 1986) was a Romanian writer. His best known novel is Cișmigiu et Comp., that presents his adventures as a student of Gheorghe Lazăr High School, situated near the Cișmigiu Gardens in central Bucharest, in the interwar period. Its sequel, Bună dimineața, băieți!, presents moments from his career as a teacher.
