= Crevedia (Colentina) =

- Location within Romania

Location
- Country: Romania
- Counties: Dâmbovița County
- Villages: Dobra, Cocani, Crevedia

Physical characteristics
- Mouth: Colentina
  - location: Crevedia
  - coordinates: 44.5864°N 25.9206°E
- Length: 37 km (23 mi)
- Basin size: 43 km^{2} (17 sq mi)

Basin features
- Progression: Colentina→ Dâmbovița→ Argeș→ Danube→ Black Sea

The Crevedia is a left tributary of the river Colentina in Romania. It discharges into the Colentina in the village Crevedia. Its length is 37 km (23 mi) and its basin size is 43 km^{2} (17 sq mi).
