= Valea Saulei =

- Location within Romania

Location
- Country: Romania
- Counties: Ilfov County, Bucharest

Physical characteristics
- Mouth: Colentina
  - location: Sector 2 (Bucharest)
  - coordinates: 44.4759°N 26.1336°E
- Length: 6 km (3.7 mi)
- Basin size: 50 km^{2} (19 sq mi)

Basin features
- Progression: Colentina→ Dâmbovița→ Argeș→ Danube→ Black Sea

The Valea Saulei is a left tributary of the river Colentina in Romania. It flows into the Colentina in Bucharest. Its length is 6 km (3.7 mi) and its basin size is 50 km^{2} (19 sq mi).
