= Lake Floreasca =

Lake Floreasca Lacul Floreasca
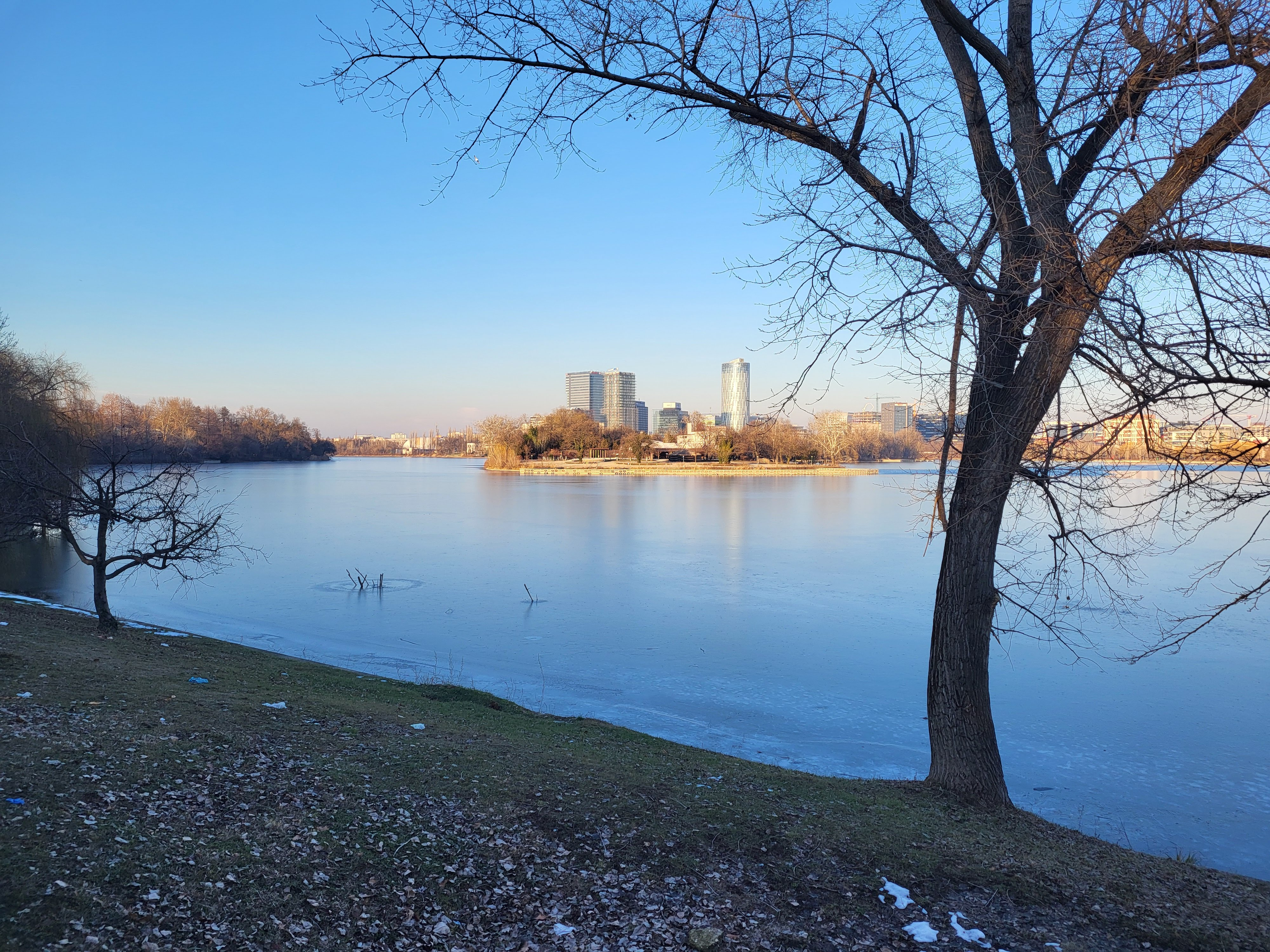
- A view from South

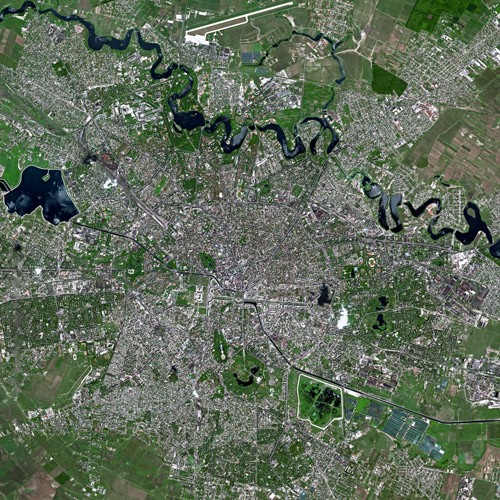
- Location within Bucharest, Romania
- Location: Sector 1, Bucharest
- Coordinates: 44.4710452°N 26.1067771°E
- Type: reservoir
- Primary inflows: Colentina River
- Primary outflows: Colentina River
- Basin countries: Romania
- Max. length: 3 km (1.9 mi)
- Max. width: 500 m (1,600 ft)
- Surface area: 74 ha (180 acres)
- Max. depth: 5 m (16 ft)
- Water volume: 16,000,000 m^{3} (13,000 acre⋅ft)

Lake Floreasca is an anthropic lake located in the northern part of the city of Bucharest, developed on the Colentina River, in the area where it flows through the urban area of the city, situated between Lake Herăstrău upstream and Lake Tei downstream.

== See also ==
- List of lakes in Bucharest
