= Răcari =

- Town
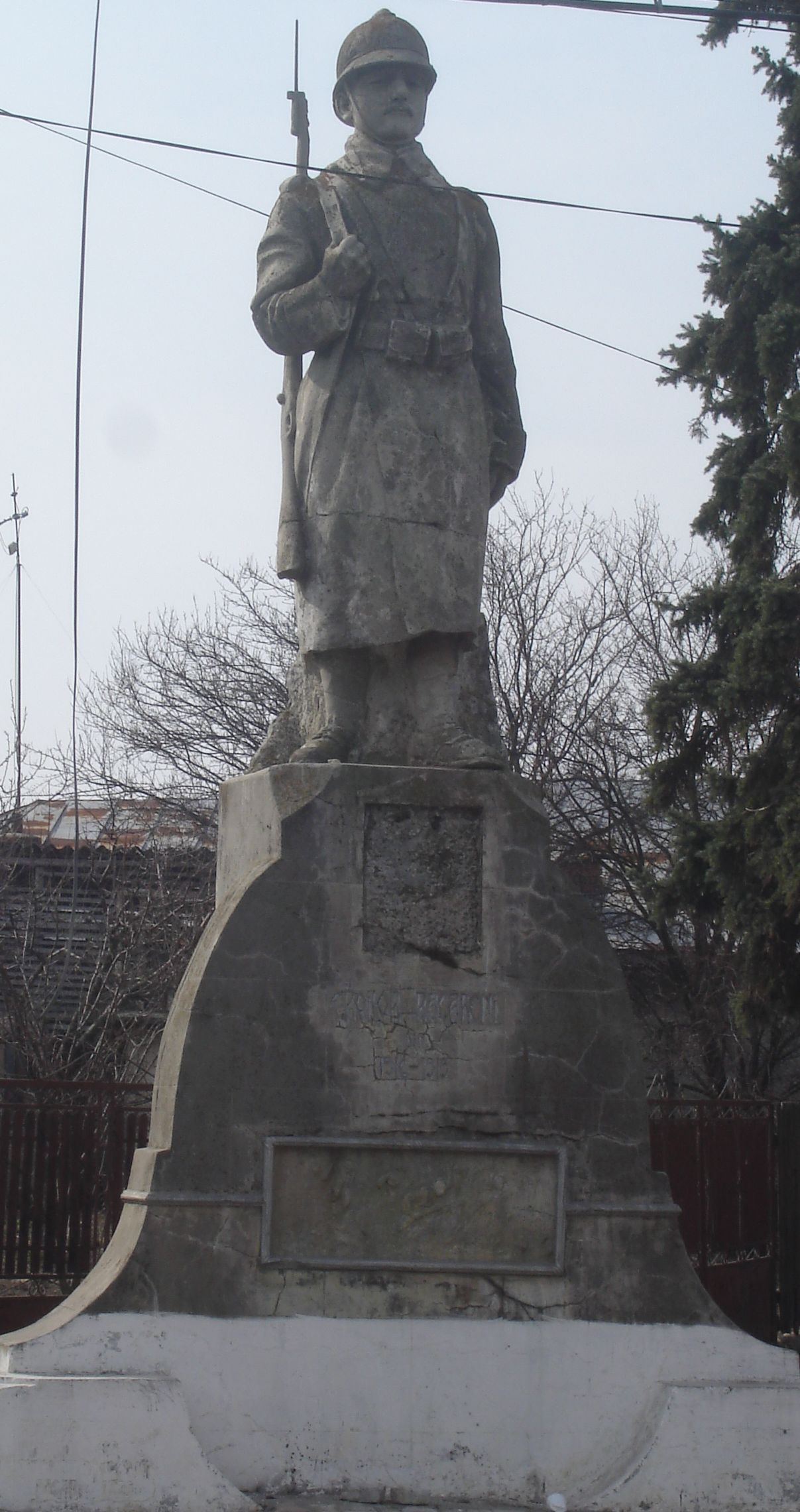
- World War I monument

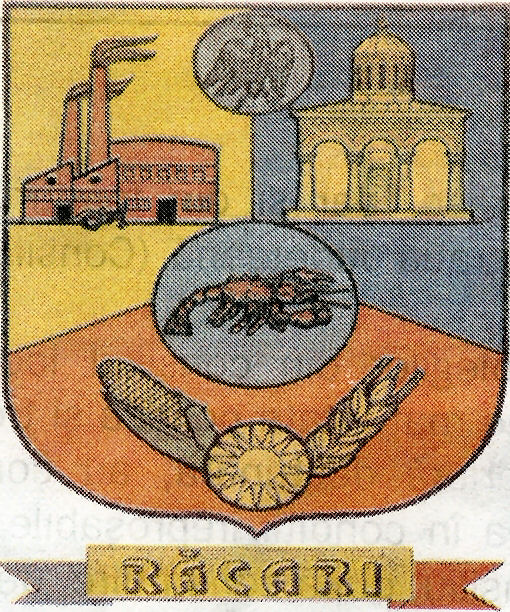
- Coat of arms

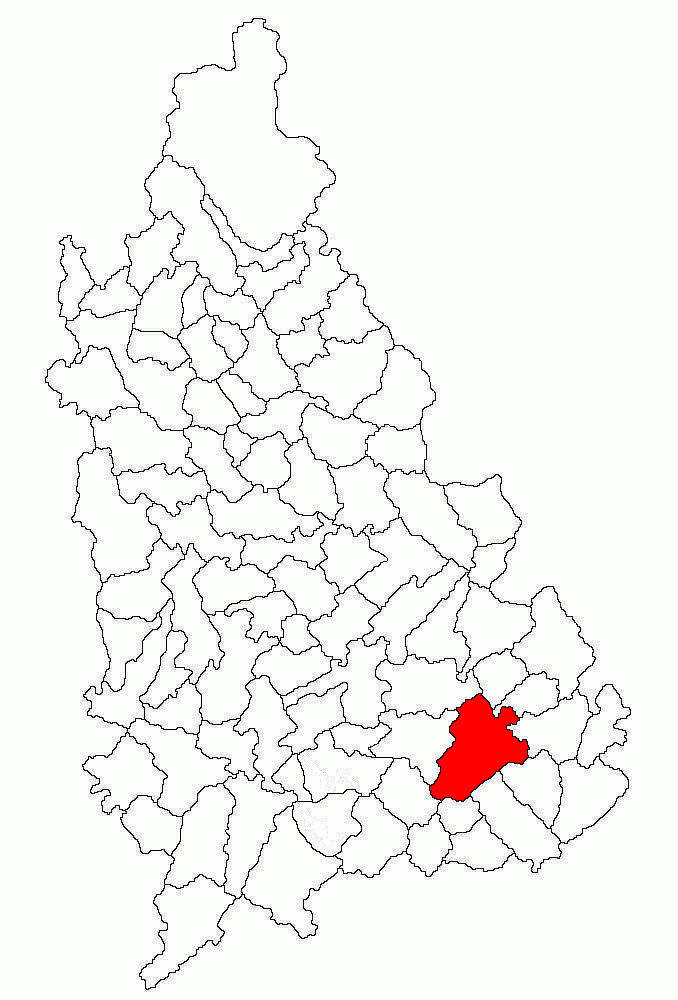
- Location in Dâmbovița County

- Location in Romania
- Coordinates: 44°38′N 25°44′E
- Country: Romania
- County: Dâmbovița

Government
  - Mayor (2024–2028): Marius-Florin Caravețeanu (PNL)
- Area: 78.94 km^{2} (30.48 sq mi)
- Elevation: 140 m (460 ft)
- Population (2021-12-01): 6,306
  - Density: 79.88/km^{2} (206.9/sq mi)
- Time zone: UTC+02:00 (EET)
  - Summer (DST): UTC+03:00 (EEST)
- Postal code: 137385
- Area code: (+40) 02 45
- Vehicle reg.: DB
- Website: primariaracari.ro

Răcari is a town located in Dâmbovița County, Muntenia, Romania. It administers seven villages: Bălănești, Colacu, Ghergani, Ghimpați, Mavrodin, Săbiești, and Stănești. It was declared a town in 2004.

The town is located in the southeastern part of the county, 40 km (25 mi) northwest of Bucharest, on road DN7. It lies in the Wallachian Plain, at an altitude of 140 m (460 ft), and is traversed by the rivers Colentina and Ilfov. Răcari borders the following communes: Bilciurești and Cojasca to the north, Tărtășești and Ciocănești to the south, Butimanu to the east, and Conțești and Cornățelu to the west.

Historical population
Year	Pop.	±%
1948	2,519	—
2002	6,892	+173.6%
2011	6,638	−3.7%
2021	6,306	−5.0%
Source: Census data

== Notable residents ==
- Ion Ghica, Prince of Samos (1854–1859) and the 5th Prime Minister of Romania (1866), died in 1897 at his estate in Ghergani
- Donar Munteanu (1886–1972), poet and magistrate, born in Răcari
- Ionelia Zaharia (born 1985), rower, born in Răcari

== See also ==
- Castra of Răcarii de Jos
