= Lake Cișmigiu =

Lake in Bucharest, Romania

Lake Cișmigiu Lacul Cișmigiu
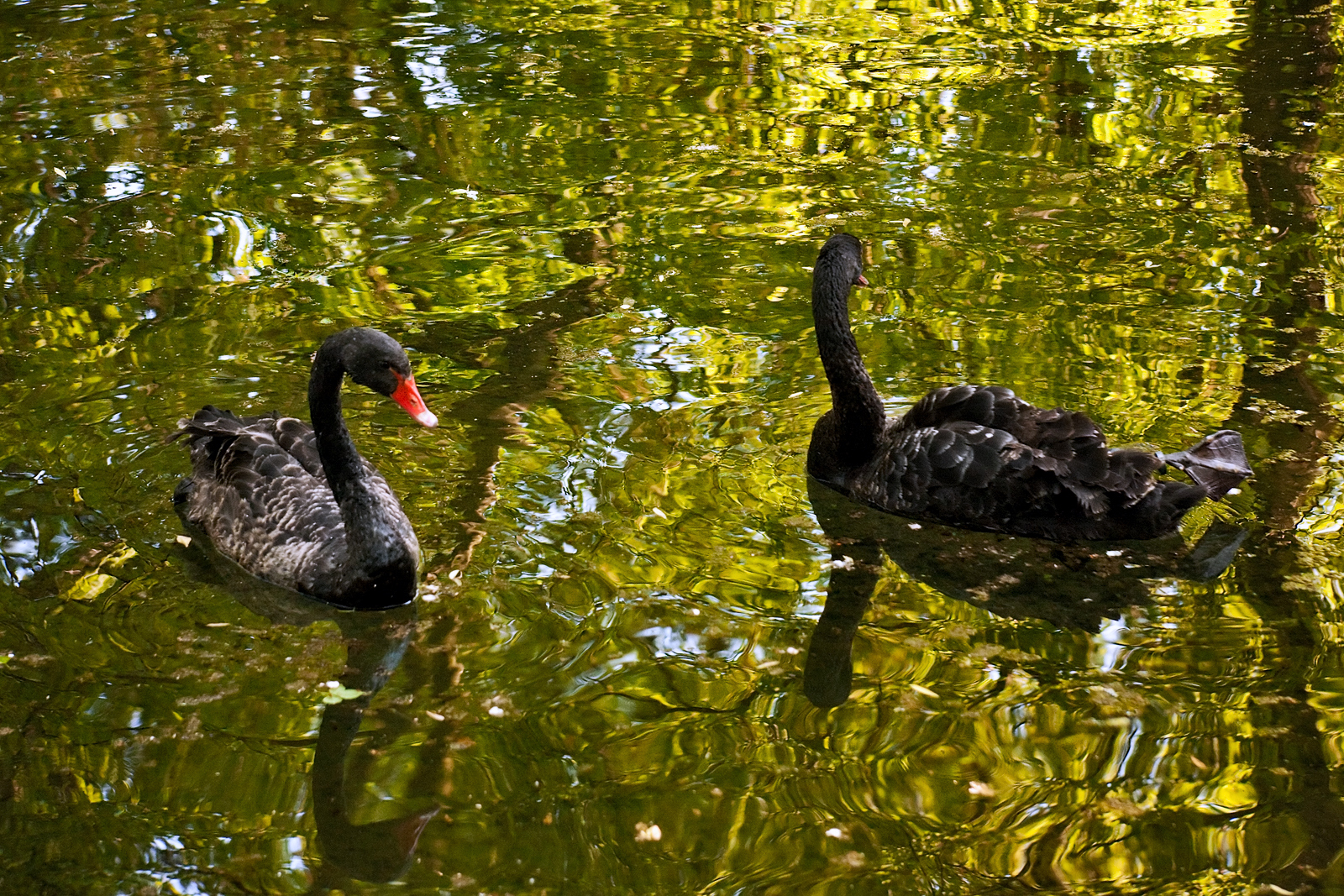

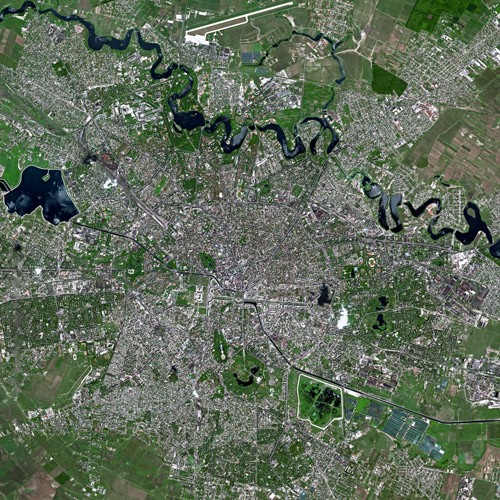
- Location within Bucharest, Romania
- Location: Sector 1, Bucharest
- Coordinates: 44°26′16.501″N 26°5′25.228″E
- Basin countries: Romania
- Max. length: 1.3 km (0.81 mi)
- Max. width: 50 m (160 ft)
- Surface area: 29,500 m^{2} (318,000 sq ft)
- Max. depth: 2 m (6 ft 7 in)

Lake Cișmigiu is a lake in the center of Bucharest, Sector 1, in Cișmigiu Gardens. The lake has a surface of 29.500 m^{2}, a length of 1.3 km, a width of 50 meters and a depth of 1–2 meters. During winter the lake is dried artificially and a skate park is organized on the lake bed. Close to the Lake Cișmigiu in the Cișmigiu Gardens is the much smaller Lake Lebedelor, which is reserved for water birds.

== History ==
The lake was formed from an old bifurcation of the Dâmbovița River and was known in the time of Matei Basarab as Balta lui Dura neguțătorul.

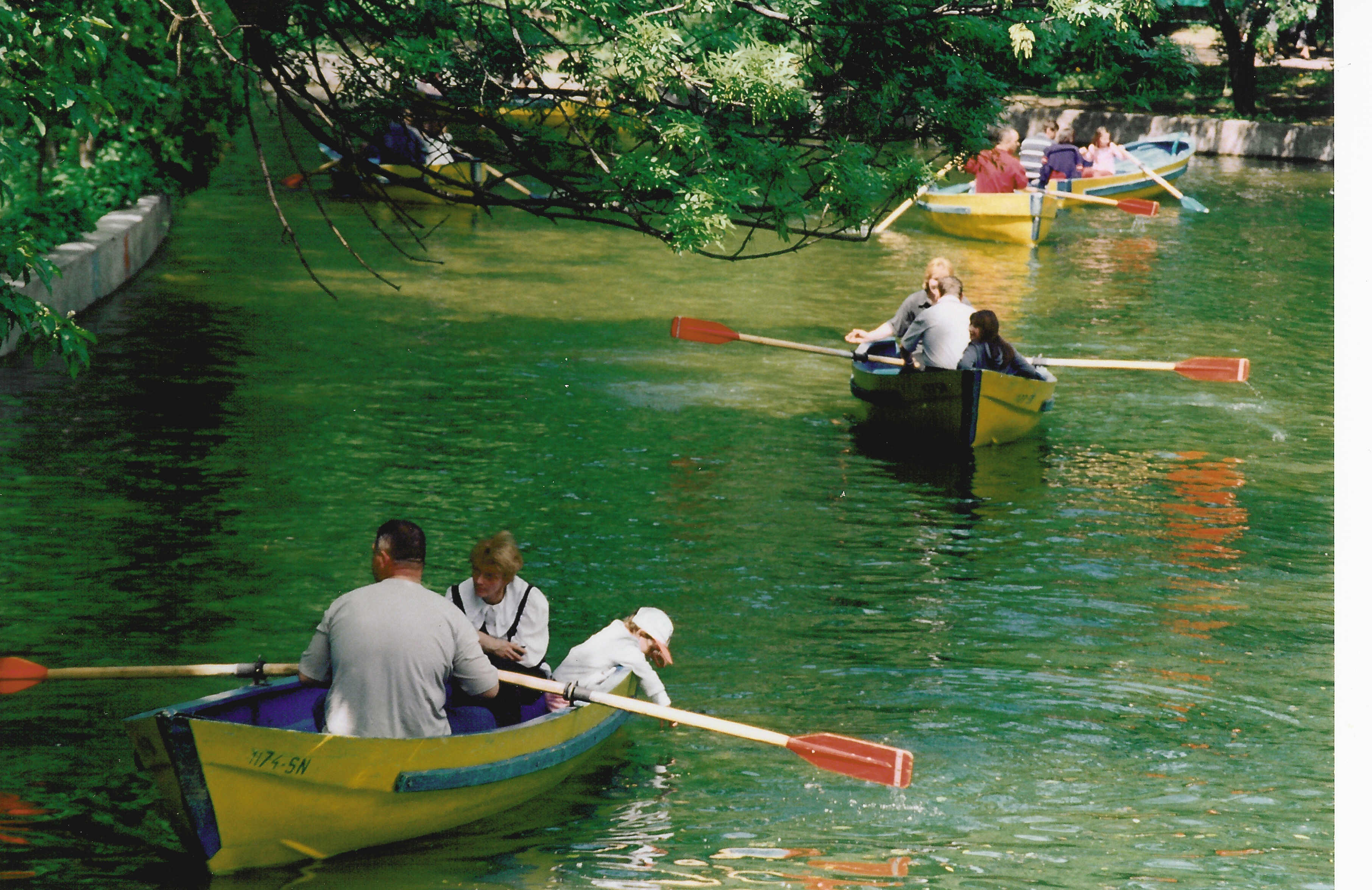

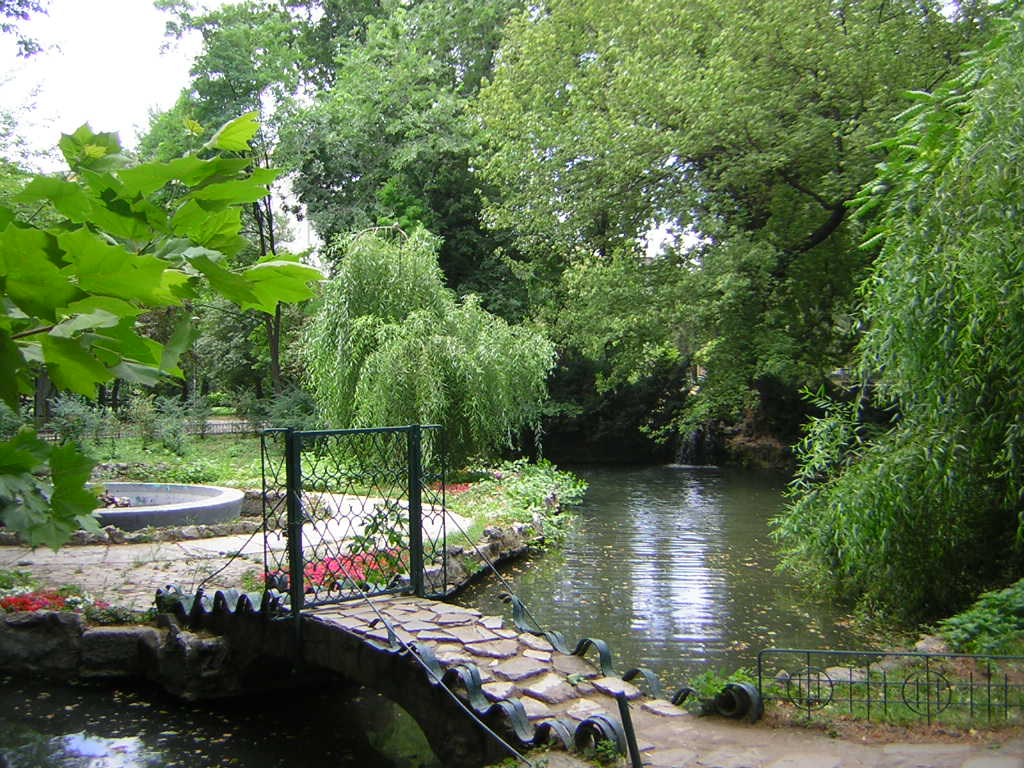

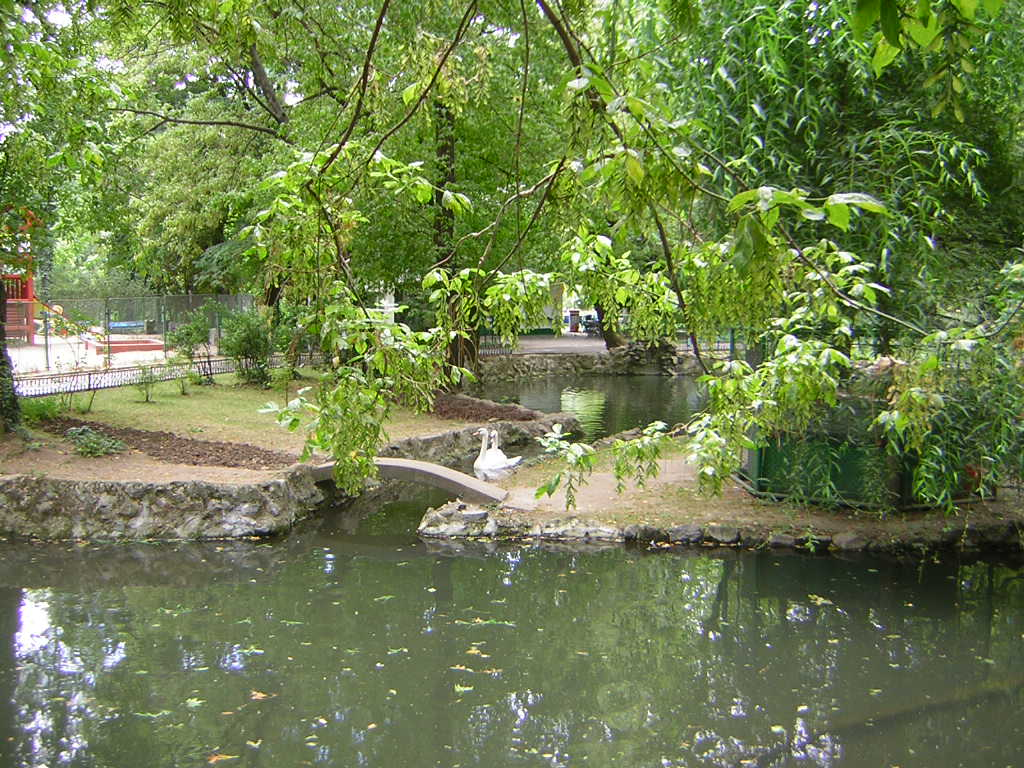

== See also ==
- List of lakes in Bucharest
