= Crevedia explosions =

2023 deadly explosion in Romania

- The first explosion image
- Date: 26 August 2023
- Time: ~18:45 EEST (first explosion)
- Location: Crevedia, Romania
- Type: Fire followed by multiple explosions
- Cause: unknown
- Deaths: 6
- Injuries: 58
- Displaced: 3,000

The Crevedia explosions were a series of three explosions that took place at a liquefied petroleum gas station in Crevedia, Dâmbovița County, Romania, on the evening of 26 August 2023.

== Timeline ==
On 26 August 2023, at 8:30, EEST, 2 tankers were at the LPG station. At around 18:00, a third tank arrived which supposedly had problems with a wheel, so they transferred the LPG to another tank. Under unexplained conditions, a source of fire appeared under the gas tank. The employee noticed, asked the 4 Nepali employees to get out and stop the traffic, while the two drivers were trying to put out the flames. Shortly after, the first explosion took place, in about an hour, various intervention crews arrived at the scene. Then followed the second explosion, the most powerful one that injured the firefighters who intervened.

The injured included two citizens from Nepal. The Romanian authorities contacted the Nepalese authorities.

On 27 August, the Prime Minister of Moldova Dorin Recean gave his condolences to the families of the victims and said that the government of Moldova would give all the necessary support to Romania.

On 31 August, Prime Minister of Romania Marcel Ciolacu announced the families of the victims would receive economic compensation.

== See also ==
- Mihăilești explosion
- Zalău explosion
