= Lake Fundeni =

- Lacul Fundeni (Romanian)
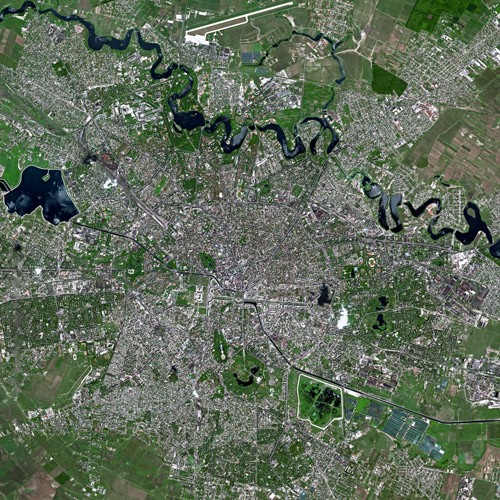
- Location within Bucharest, Romania

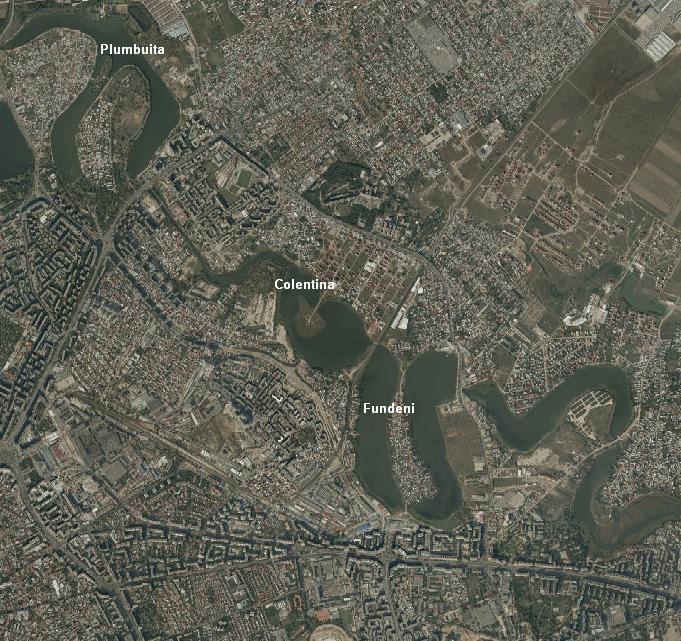
- Location: Sector 2, Bucharest
- Coordinates: 44.451122°N 26.161194°E
- Basin countries: Romania
- Max. length: 2.1 km (1.3 mi)
- Max. width: 800 m (2,600 ft)
- Surface area: 350,000 m^{2} (3,800,000 sq ft)
- Max. depth: 5 m (16 ft)
- Water volume: 800,000 m^{3} (28,000,000 cu ft)

Lake Fundeni is a man-made lake on the Colentina River in Bucharest, Sector 2. It has a surface of 35 ha (86 acres), length of 2.1 km (1.3 mi), width of 200–800 m, a depth between 1 and 5 meters, and a volume of 800,000 m^{3} (1,000,000 cu yd).

In the middle of the lake there is an island with a surface area of 3.16 ha (7.8 acres). Upstream, to the west, is Lake Colentina, and downstream, to the east, is Lake Dobroești.

== See also ==
- List of lakes in Bucharest
