= Lake Văcărești =

Lake in Bucharest, Romania

- Lacul Văcărești (Romanian)
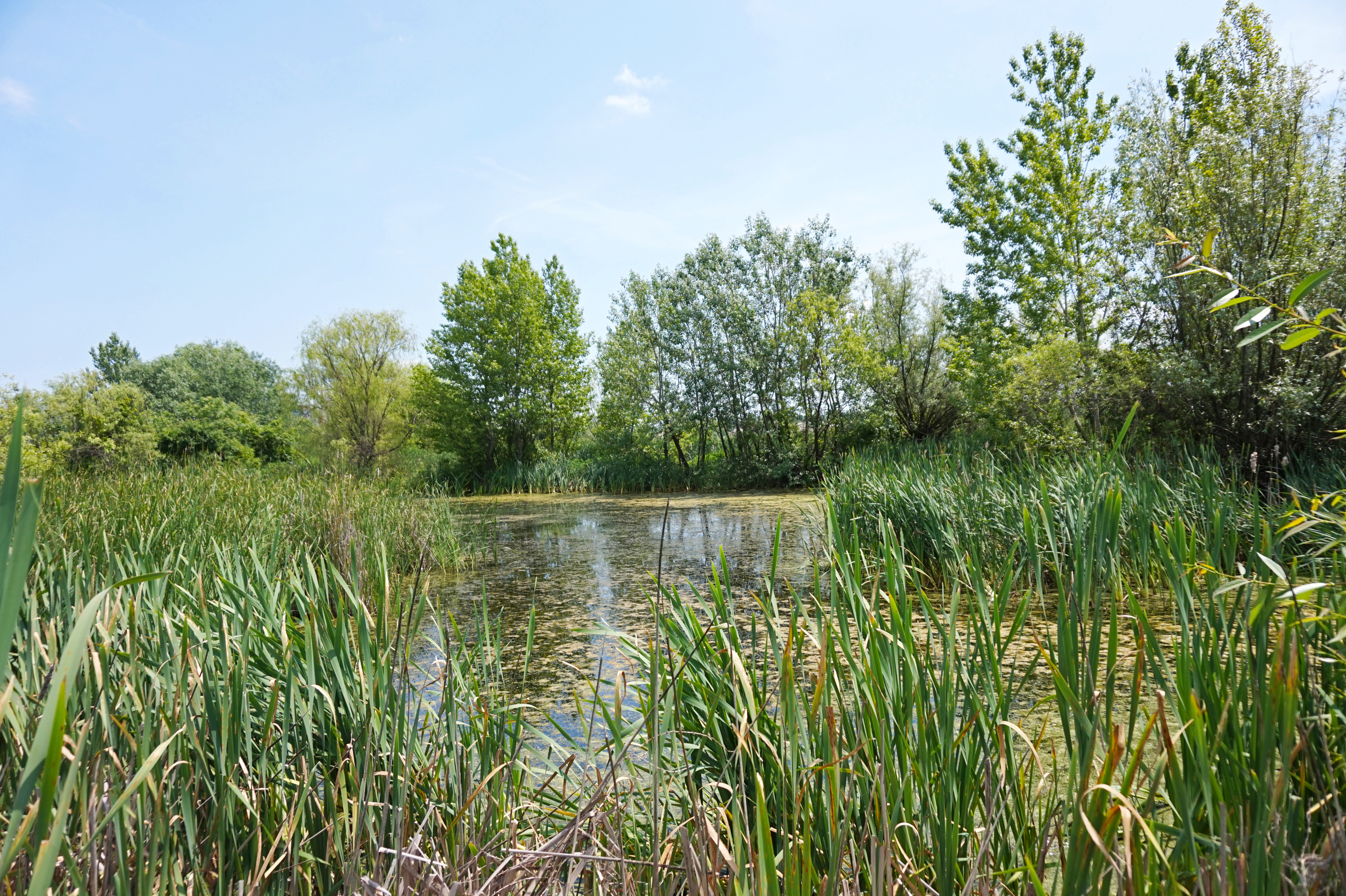

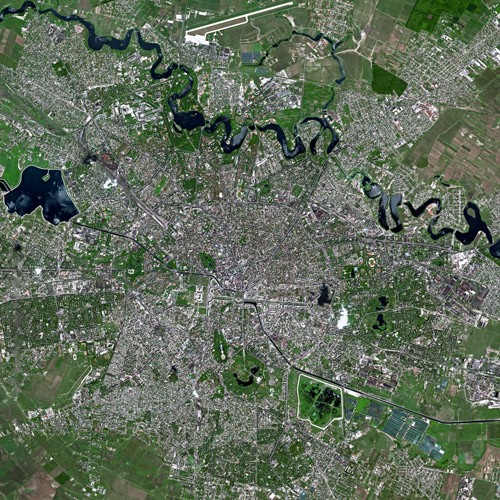
- Location within Bucharest, Romania
- Location: Sector 4, Bucharest
- Coordinates: 44°24′5.0796″N 26°7′52.460″E
- Basin countries: Romania
- Max. length: 2.3 km (1.4 mi)
- Max. width: 2 km (1.2 mi)
- Surface area: 140.5 ha (347 acres)
- Max. depth: 2 m (6 ft 7 in)

Lake Văcărești is a lake in the south of Bucharest, Sector 4. The lake has a surface of 140.5 hectares (347 acres). It is now part of the Văcărești Nature Park, a protected zone of nature. Over 100 species of wild birds and animals live in this area. The area is nicknamed Bucharest Delta.

== History ==
The lake was formed from an old bifurcation of the Dâmbovița River and was previously known as Balta Văcărești.

On June 5, 2014, the Lake Văcărești zone was declared protected zone and named Natural Park Văcărești by the Government of Romania.

== See also ==
- List of lakes in Bucharest
