= Cișmigiu Gardens =

Park in Bucharest, Romania

Cișmigiu Gardens (Cișmigiu Park)
- Grădinile Cișmigiu (Parcul Cișmigiu)
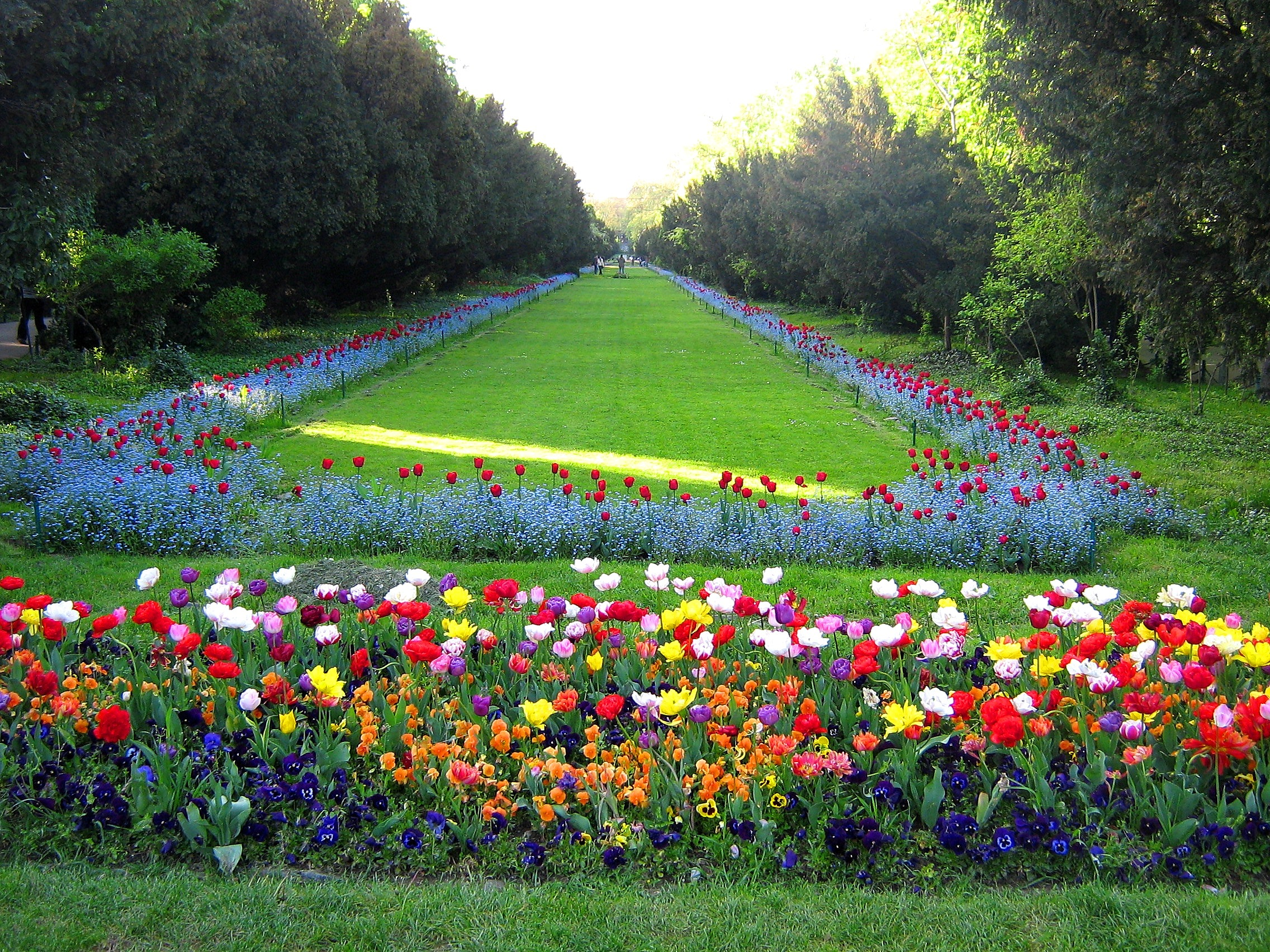

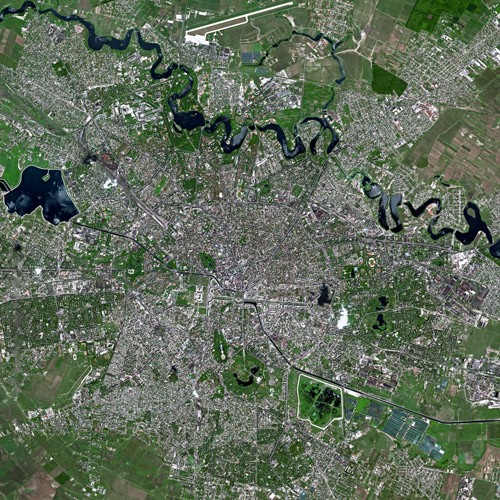
- Location within Bucharest, Romania
- Interactive map of Cișmigiu Gardens (Cișmigiu Park)
- Location: Bucharest, Romania
- Coordinates: 44°26′12.85″N 26°05′25.83″E
- Area: 14.6 hectares (36 acres)
- Established: 1847
- Administrator: Administrația Lacuri, Parcuri și Agrement București
- Status: Open all year
- Public transit: Izvor metro station Universitate metro station
- Designers: Wilhelm Friedrich Carl Meyer, Franz Hörer, and Friedrich Rebhuhn

The Cișmigiu Gardens or Cișmigiu Park (Romanian: Grădinile Cișmigiu or Parcul Cișmigiu) are a public park in the center of Bucharest, Romania, spanning areas on all sides of an artificial lake. The gardens' creation was an important moment in the history of Bucharest. They form the oldest and, at 14.6 hectares (36 acres), the largest park in city's central area.

The main entrance is from Elisabeta Boulevard, in front of the General City Hall of Bucharest; there is another major entrance at the Știrbei Vodă Street, near the Crețulescu Palace. The southwestern corner of the park is adjacent to the prestigious Gheorghe Lazăr National College. The park attracts an average of 5,100 visitors on a weekend day.

== Landmarks ==
The Rondul Român ("Romanian Round") or Rotonda Scriitorilor ("Writers' Rotunda") is a circular alley which has stone busts of twelve important Romanian writers: Mihai Eminescu, Alexandru Odobescu, Titu Maiorescu, Ion Luca Caragiale, George Coșbuc, Ștefan Octavian Iosif, Ion Creangă, Alexandru Vlahuță, Duiliu Zamfirescu, Bogdan Petriceicu Hasdeu, Nicolae Bălcescu and Vasile Alecsandri.

Monumentul Eroilor Francezi ("The Monument of French Heroes") commemorates French soldiers who died fighting during the World War I Romanian Campaign. Made in Carrara marble, the French monument was created by the Romanian sculptor Ion Jalea and was inaugurated on 25 October 1922. The sculptural work Izvorul Sissi Stefanidi, was created by Ioan C. Dimitriu Bârlad (1890–1964), and it depicts a mother, aggrieved by the death of her daughter, pouring water from a pitcher.

Monumentul Eroilor Americani ("The Monument of American Heroes") commemorates the 378 US soldiers who died in Romania during World War II. The granite sculpture is the work of the artist Remus Botarro; it was officially inaugurated in 2002 by the Romanian Government and the American Embassy in Bucharest.

Other statues located in Cișmigiu are the one of journalist George Panu, sculpted by Gheorghe Horvath, and of writer and women's rights activist Maica Smara (1854–1944), sculpted by Mihai Onofrei.

== History ==
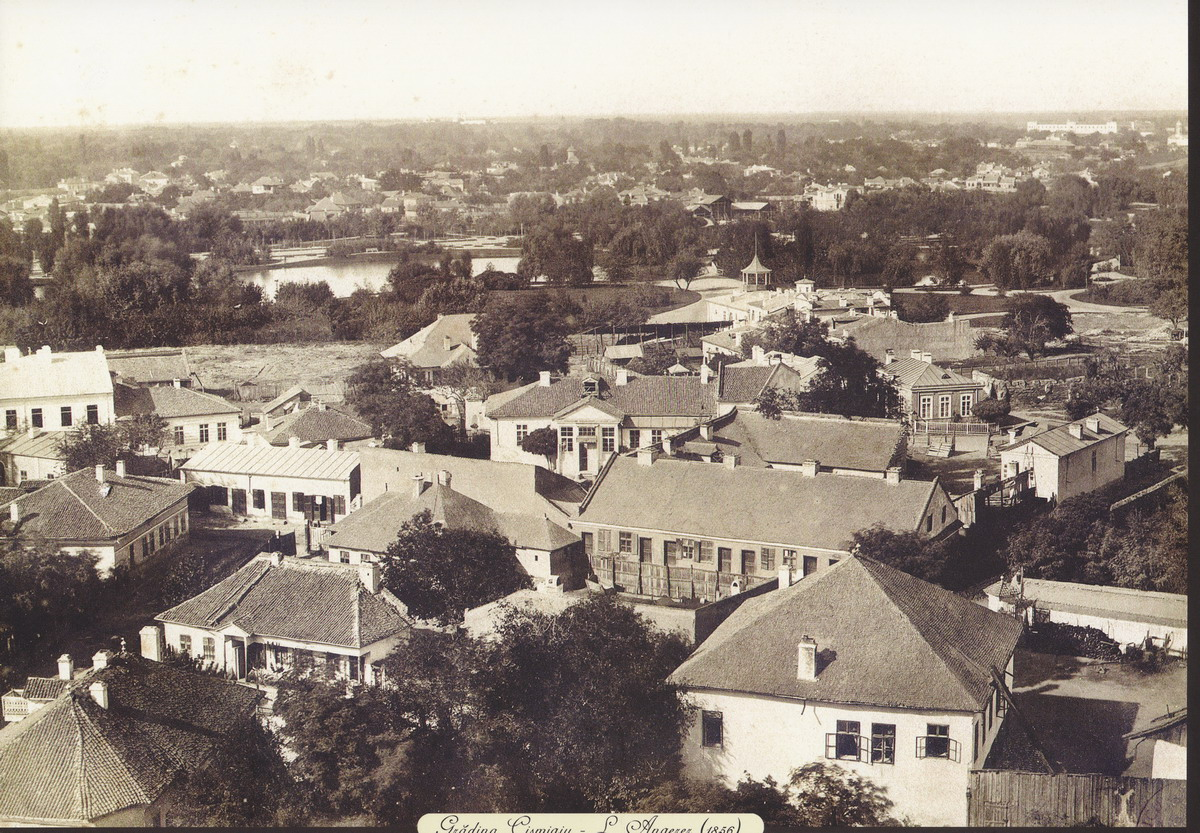
1856, photo taken by Ludwig Angerer

The park was built in 1847, at a time when Bucharest was the capital of Wallachia, on a site formerly known as Lacul lui Dura neguțătorul (the "Lake of Dura the merchant"), or simply as Dura. The pool it replaced was a popular site for fishing from as early as the 17th century, and was inhabited by mallard colonies. A part of the present-day gardens was occupied by a vineyard, which was planted around a water source: the latter had been tapped during the bubonic plague epidemic of 1795, when the two sons of Prince Alexander Mourousis took refuge in the largely uninhabited zone.

The decision to replace the lake was taken in 1846, during a period of Imperial Russian administration introduced by Regulamentul Organic. It was based on an earlier proposal made by Russian governor Pavel Kiselyov in 1830, and on various small-scale works had first been undertaken in 1837. The initiative, countersigned by Prince Gheorghe Bibescu, was part of a series of major public works, and the plan dates back to 1844. On 27 February 1845, the area passed into public ownership through a princely decree.

In 1843, Bibescu had called on experts in horticulture and planning to join in the effort to restructure the city gardens. As a result, two citizens of the German Confederation, the horticulturist Wilhelm Friedrich Carl Meyer and his assistant, the gardener Franz Hörer, arrived in Bucharest, where their first work involved the floral arrangements on each side of Șoseaua Kiseleff. They were to become involved in redesigning Dura area: Meyer was responsible for setting up the new lanes, for planting new floral species, as well as for setting up a Romantic landscape with rocks leading down to the lake. The central lake was connected to the Dâmbovița River through a canal. The gardens were ultimately inaugurated on 23 September 1847, and Meyer was appointed their administrator in 1848.

The word cișmigiu comes from Turkish: a Ceșme is a public fountain and a cișmigiu (or cișmegiu) used to be the person responsible for building and maintaining public fountains. The name replaced older references to Dura, and was coined by the public because, at the time, the administrator of Bucharest fountains was living on park grounds, in a house located between the central lake and Sărindar quarter.

Cișmigiu continued to be developed by Meyer long after its official inauguration: in 1870, the horticulturist laid out a plan to redesign the lanes, to introduce an artesian aquifer, and to create a kiosk for an orchestra. He also proposed to have gondolas carrying visitors over the lake. By 1851, new species of trees were brought in: chestnuts from Gorj County, walnuts from Dâmbovița County, and other plants from places such as Vienna and Brașov. At the same time, the lanes were reinforced with debris from the ruins of Curtea Nouă and Zlătari area. Works were completed despite Meyer's sudden death as a result of typhoid fever in August 1852.

The park was clearly delimited after Bucharest became capital of the Kingdom of Romania: in 1871, Academiei Boulevard was extended to its western side, and, in 1890, under Mayor Pache Protopopescu, Elisabeta Boulevard was created on its southern side. During the 1860s, Bucharest was visited by the socialist activist and philosopher Ferdinand Lassalle, who argued that "Cișmigiu exceeds by far anything Germany has to offer".

In 1882, the gardens were fitted with electrical lighting. Seven years later, the Gheorghe Lazăr High School was built on its southwestern corner (it was to be extended during the 1930s). During the late 19th and early 20th century, Cișmigiu became noted for housing the Thierry Restaurant, kept by a Frenchman, and various amateur photographers who made affordable portraits. The building in front of the park was assigned to the City Hall during the communist regime.

Meyer was succeeded in his office of garden administrator by other Germans: Ulrich Hoffman, Wilhelm Knechtel, and Friedrich Rebhuhn. It was Rebhuhn who, after 1910, redesigned many parts of the gardens to their present-day appearance.

In 1990, the park served as the location for Elder Russell M. Nelson of The Church of Jesus Christ of Latter-day Saints to pronounce a dedicatory blessing over the country of Romania.

== In fiction ==
Cișmigiu, a traditional meeting spot for Bucharesters, is referred to in several literary works. These notably include several sketch stories by Ion Luca Caragiale, two of them involving the collective character Mitică, who has survived in common reference as a stereotype of Bucharesters. In the eponymous 1900 sketch, the voluble Mitică notably refers to a friend of his having been laid off from his job, an event which he sarcastically disguises as a promotion to "chasing flies out of Cișmigiu". In another such piece, titled 1 Aprilie ("The First of April"), the gardens are the scene of a dramatic incident which involves the death of another or the same Mitică. A character named Caracudi, whom Caragiale invented as a caricature of inventive journalists, is shown to elaborate his sensationalist articles while relaxing in various locations of the city, one of which is Cișmigiu.

A novel by Grigore Băjenaru, titled Cișmigiu et comp., traces events in the life of high school students who spend much of their time in the park.

The novel 'The Great Fortune' (1960), part of the Balkan Trilogy series by English writer Olivia Manning has several scenes set in the gardens.

== Gallery ==
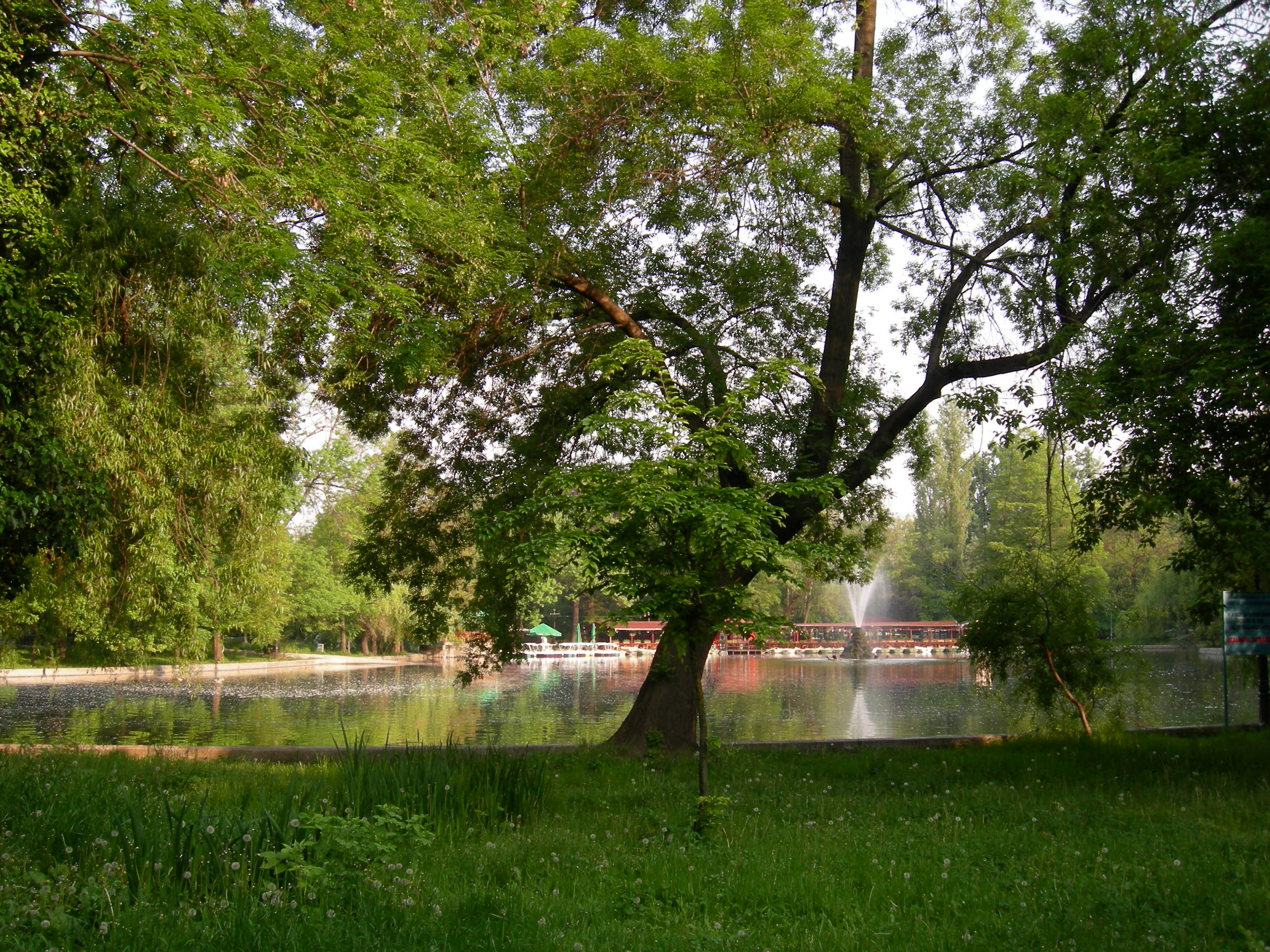
Fountain on Cișmigiu Lake

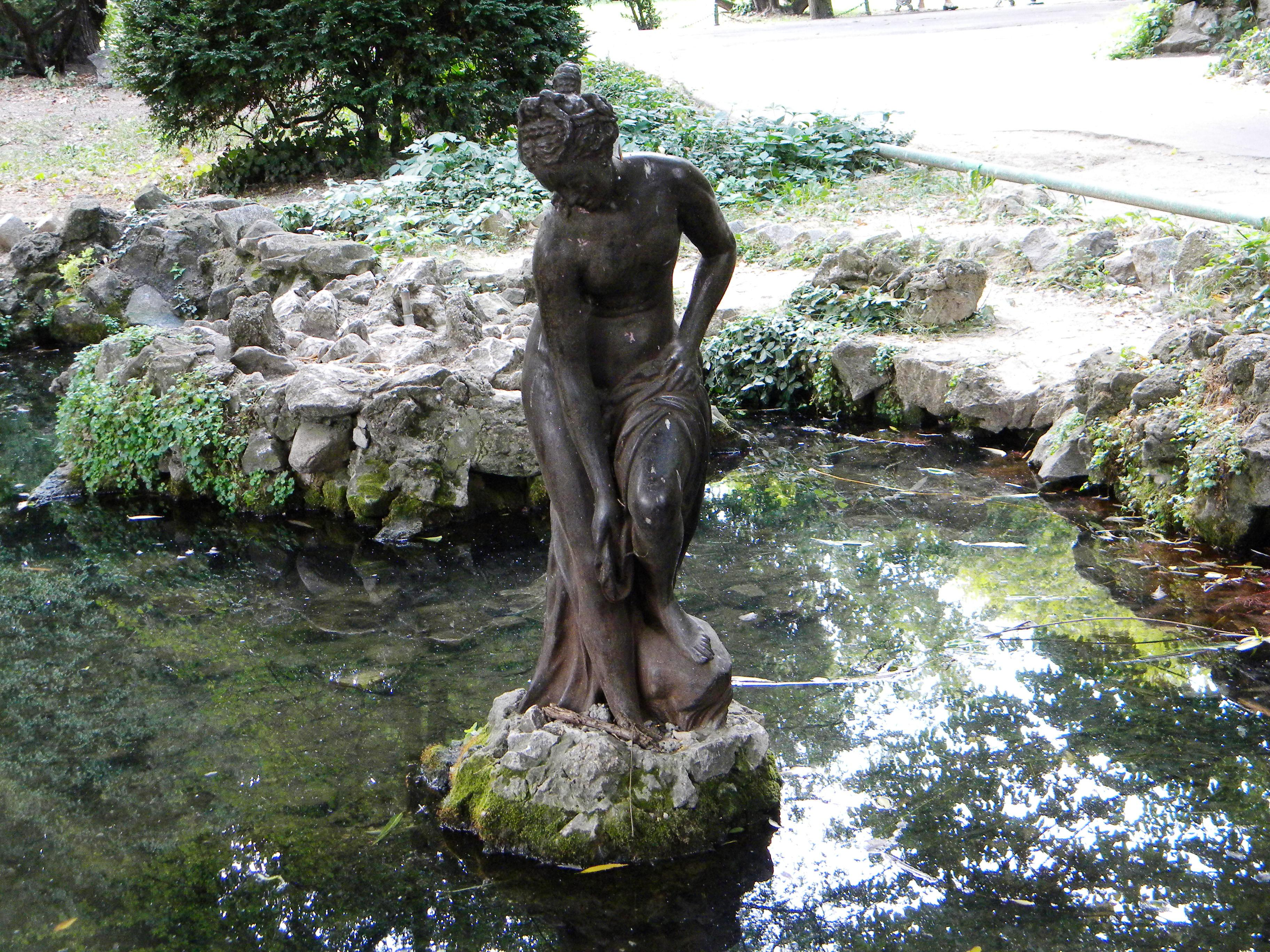
Statue

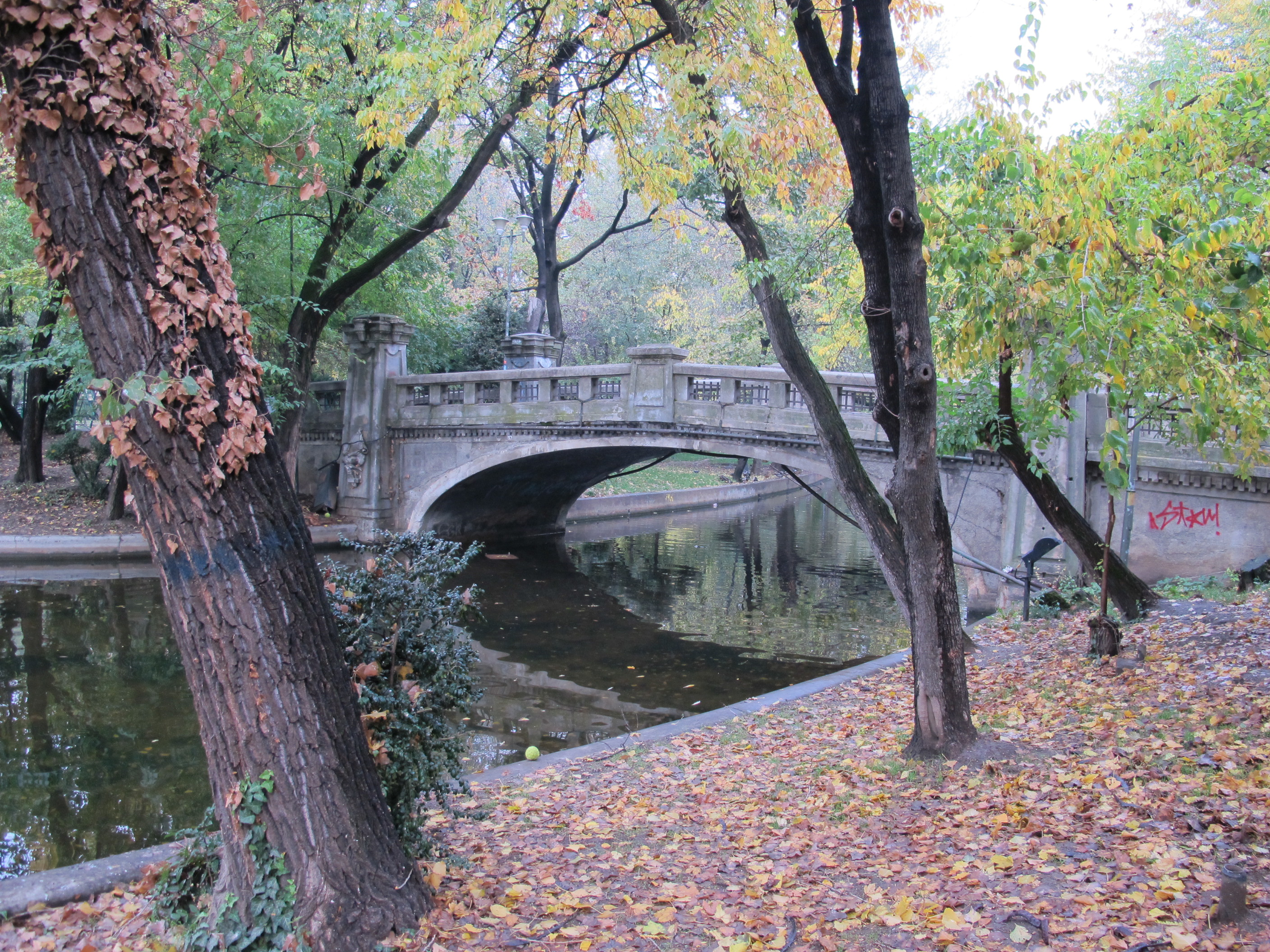
Bridge

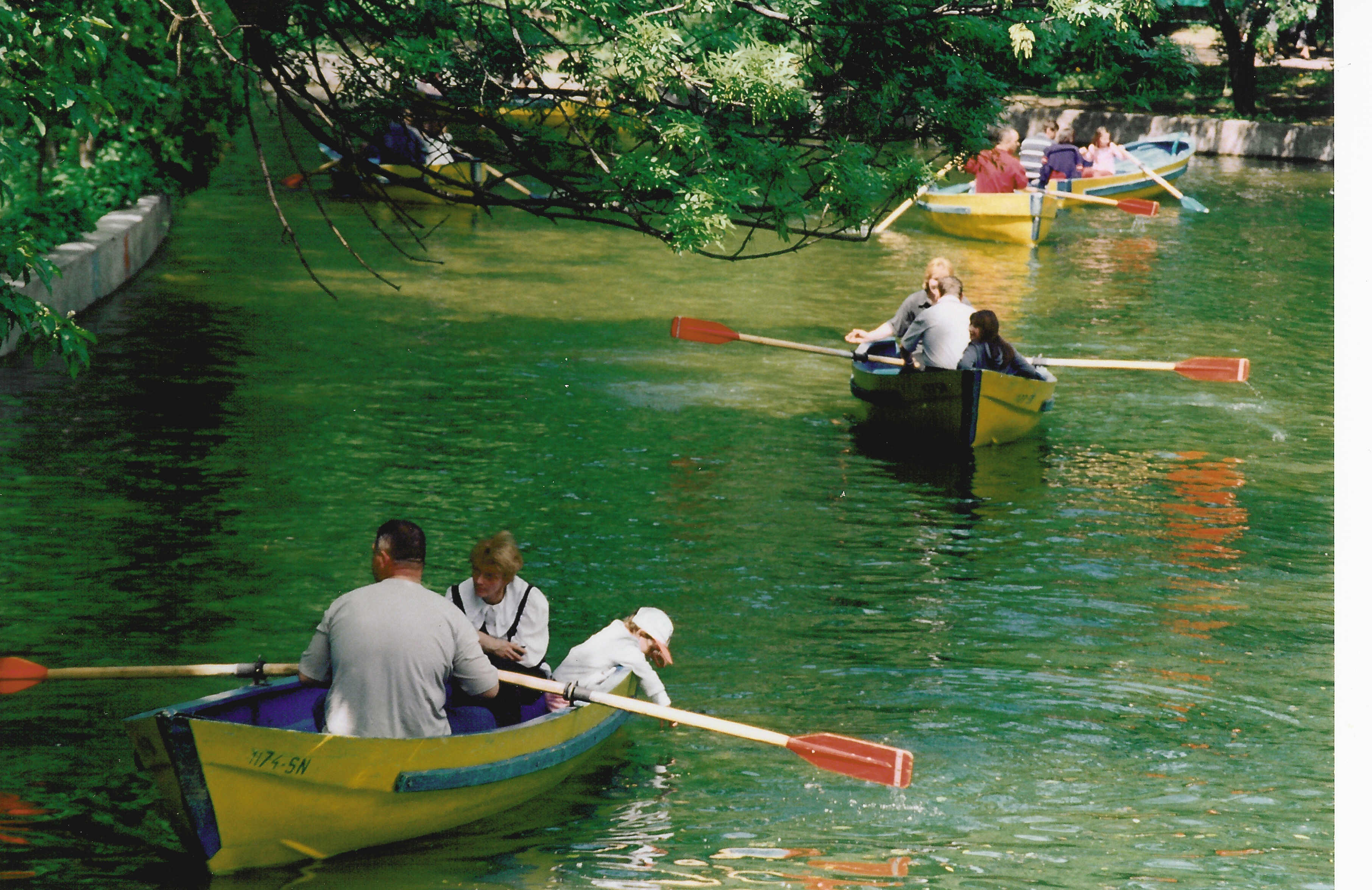
Rowboats on the lake

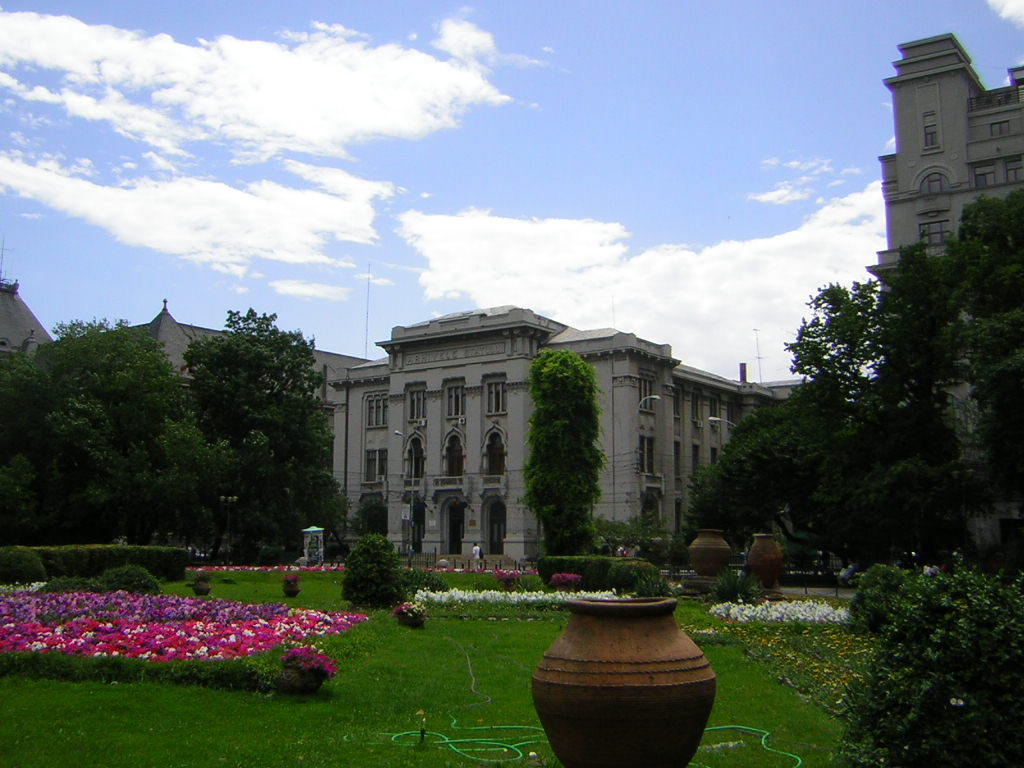
The main entrance

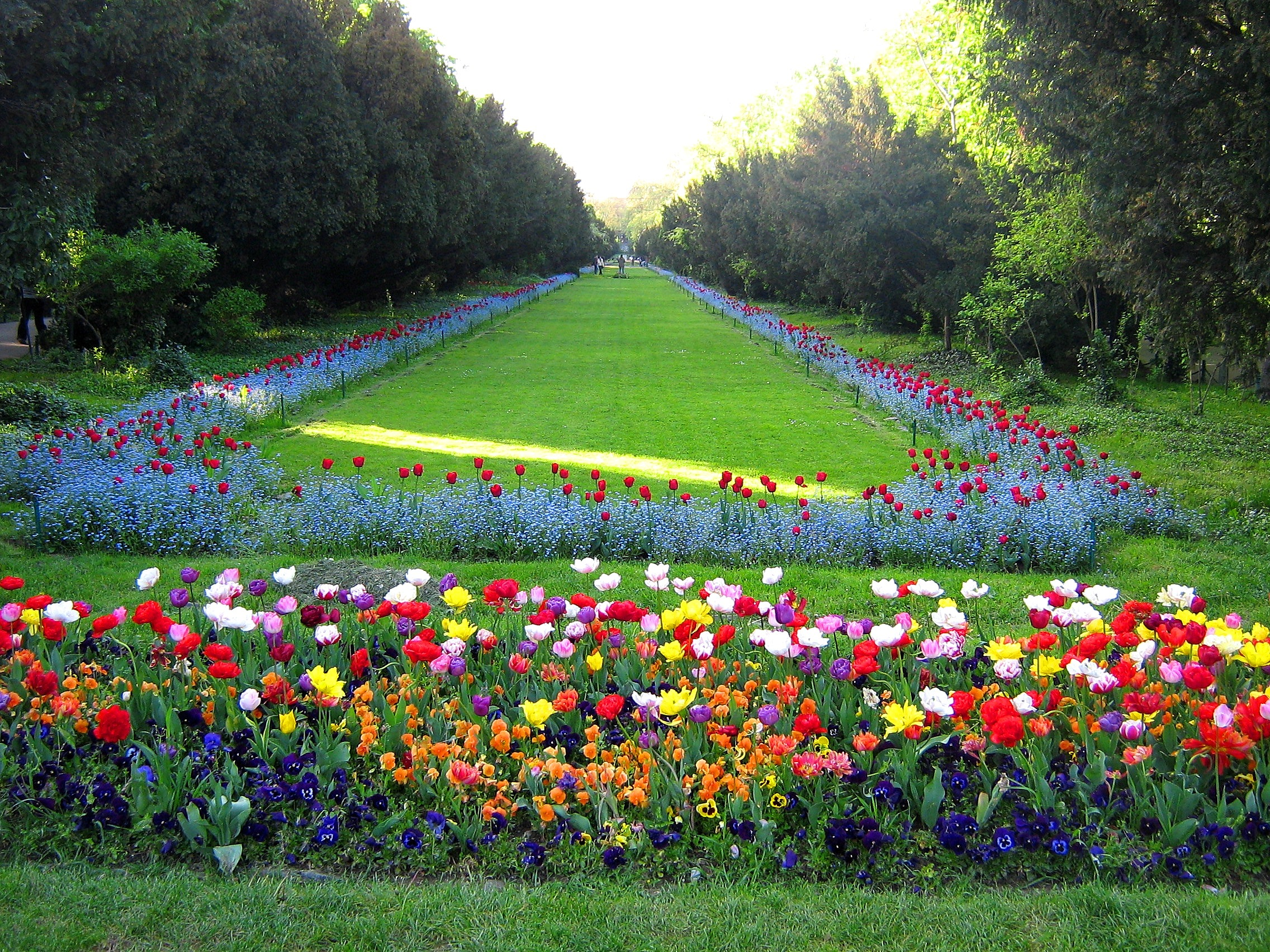
A flower carpet

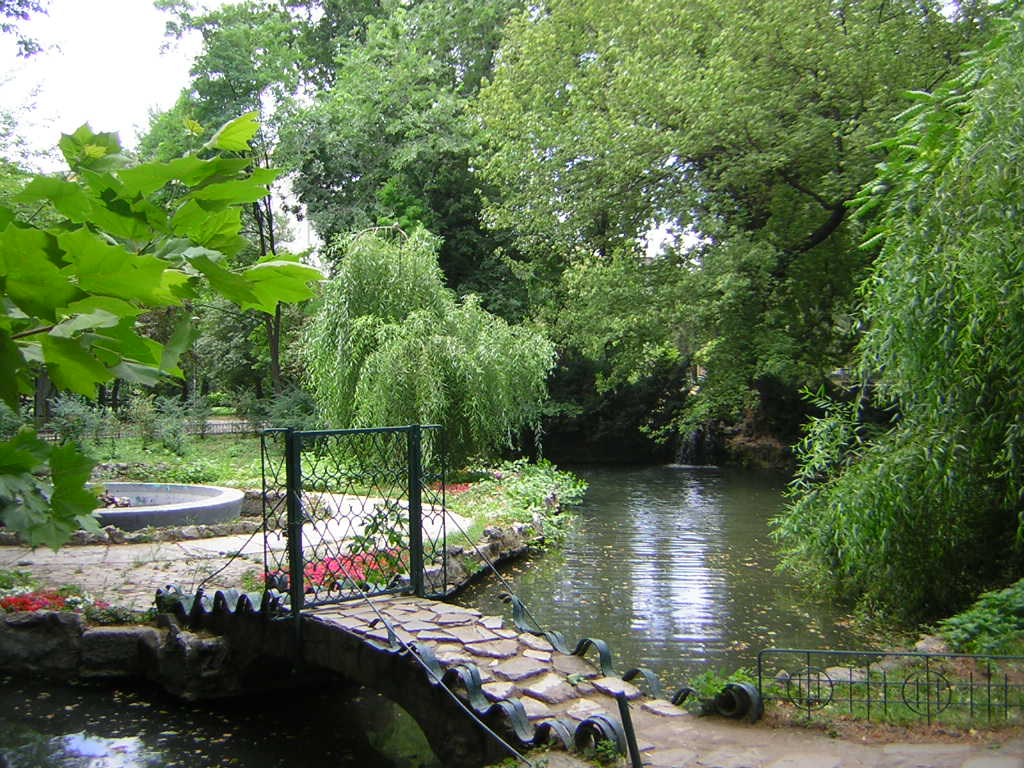
Little bridge

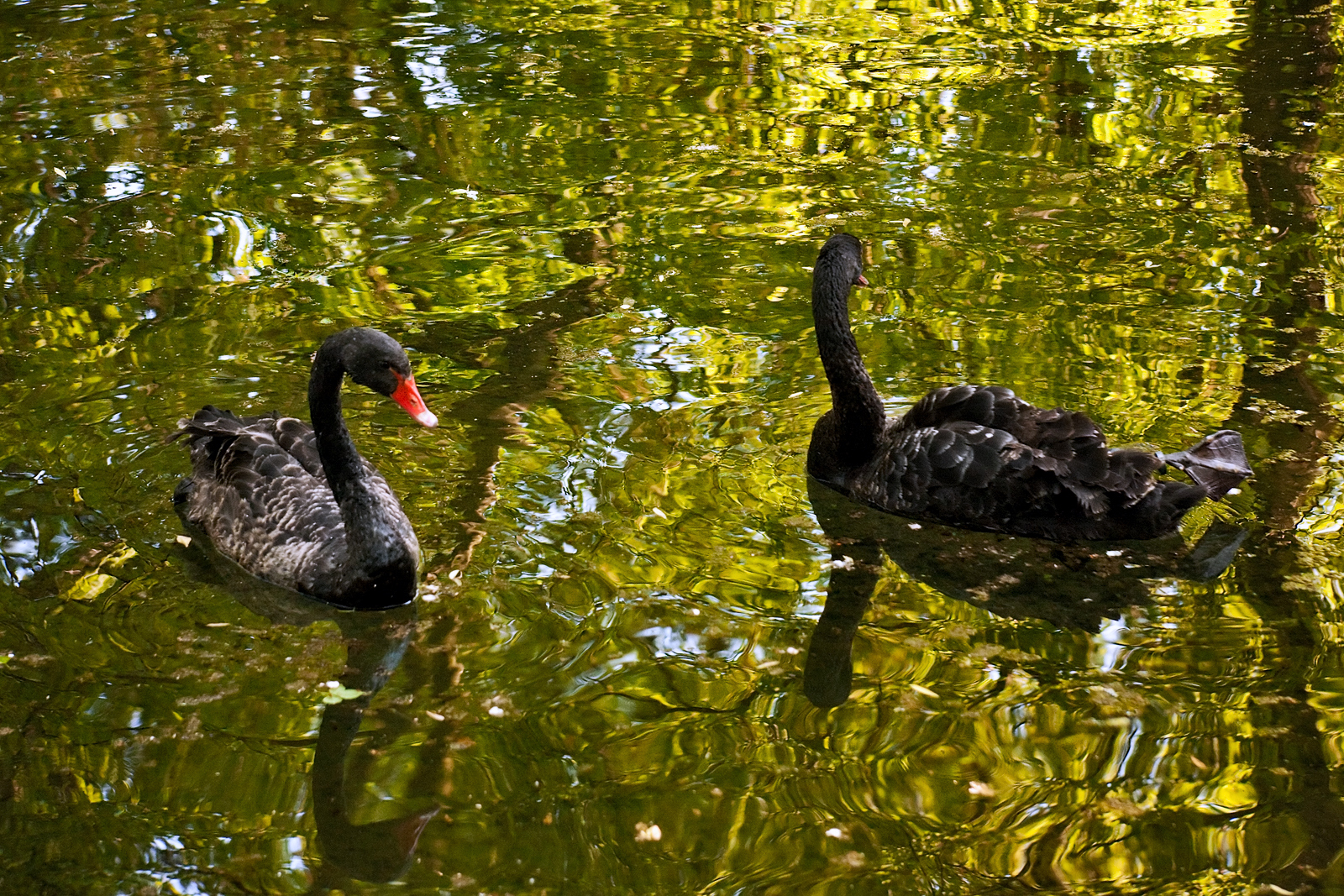
Black Swans

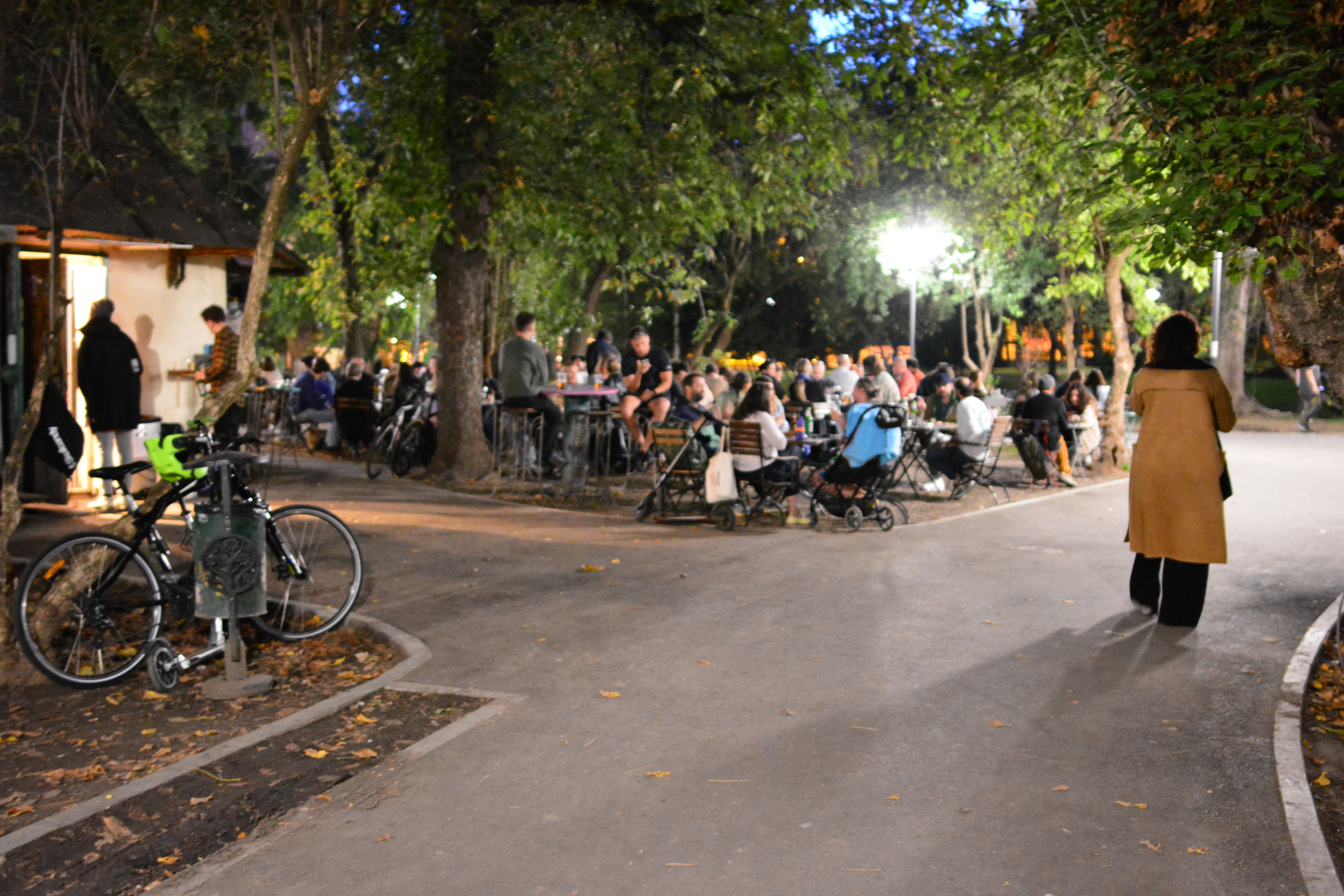
Outdoor bar on an autumn evening
