= Crevedia =

- Commune
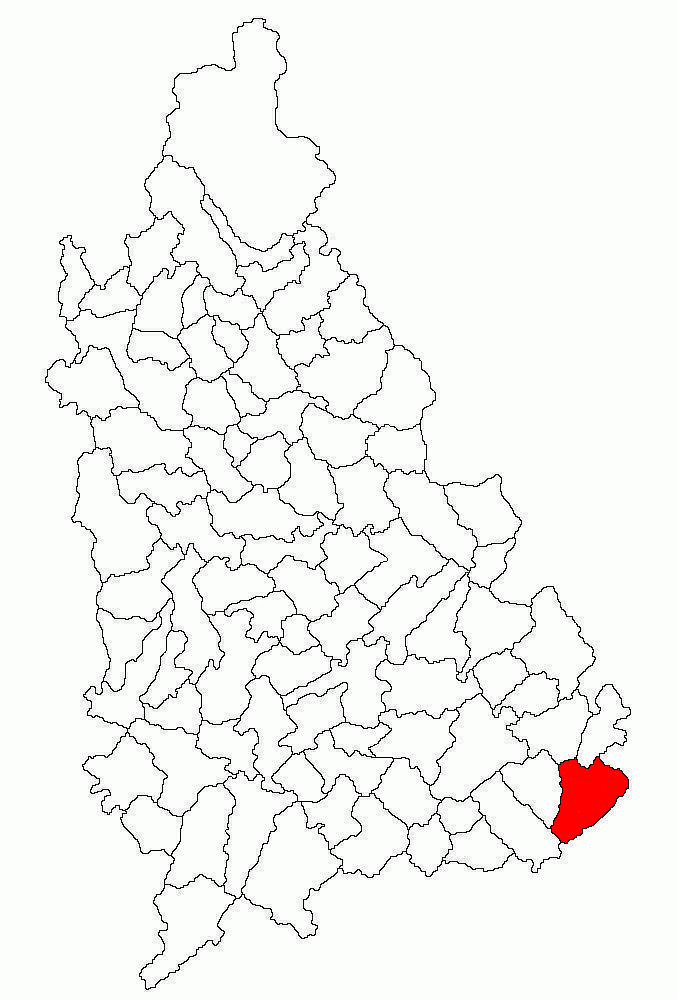
- Location in Dâmbovița County

- Location in Romania
- Coordinates: 44°36′N 25°56′E
- Country: Romania
- County: Dâmbovița

Government
  - Mayor (2024–2028): Florin Petre (PSD)
- Area: 52.78 km^{2} (20.38 sq mi)
- Elevation: 111 m (364 ft)
- Population (2021-12-01): 8,811
  - Density: 170/km^{2} (430/sq mi)
- Time zone: EET/EEST (UTC+2/+3)
- Postal code: 137180
- Area code: +(40) 245
- Vehicle reg.: DB
- Website: primariacrevedia.ro

Crevedia is a commune in Dâmbovița County, Muntenia, Romania with a population of 8,811 people as of 2021. It is composed of five villages: Cocani, Crevedia, Dârza, Mănăstirea, and Samurcași.

The commune is situated in the Wallachian Plain, at an altitude of 111 m (364 ft), on the banks of the Colentina River and its tributary, the Crevedia. It is located in the southeastern extremity of Dâmbovița County, 60 km (37 mi) from the county seat, Târgoviște, on the border with Ilfov County, next to the town of Buftea; the city of Ploiești is 44 km (27 mi) to the northeast, while Bucharest is 27 km (17 mi) to the southeast.

Crevedia is crossed by national road DN1A, which connects Bucharest and Brașov via Ploiești. The Dârza halt serves the CFR Main Line 500, which runs from Bucharest to Ploiești and on towards Moldavia and the Ukrainian border.

The commune mayor's illegal liquefied petroleum gas business was the cause of a series of explosions in August 2023 resulting in six deaths and numerous injured including firefighters that were responding to the blaze that caused the explosion. The mayor also attempted to build a commercial centre near a liquefied petroleum gas station, which was cancelled by the Dâmbovița Court.

Historical population
Year	Pop.	±%
2002	6,749	—
2011	7,750	+14.8%
2021	8,811	+13.7%
Source: Census data
