= Lake Băneasa =

Reservoir in Bucharest, Romania

Lake Băneasa Lacul Băneasa
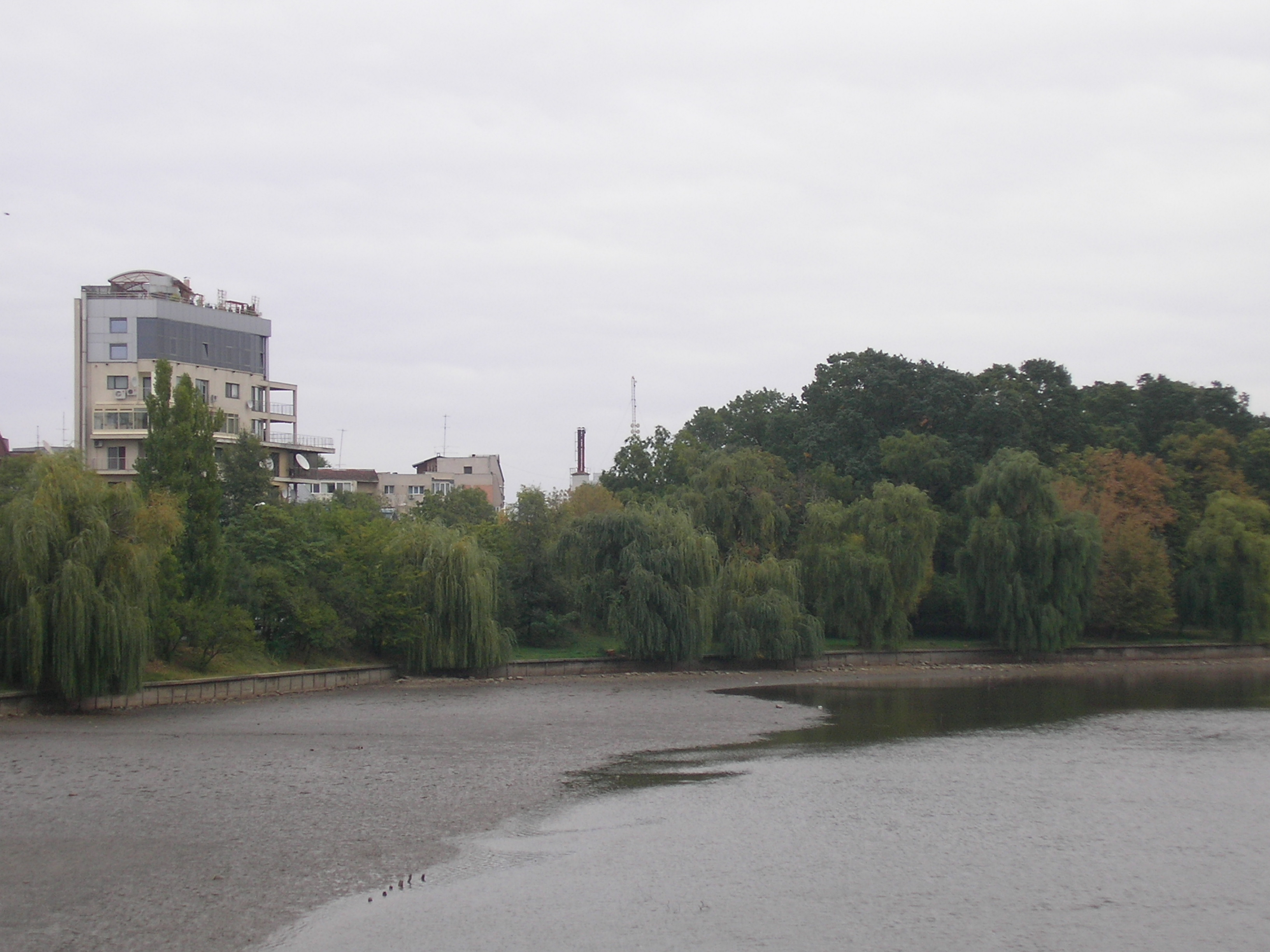

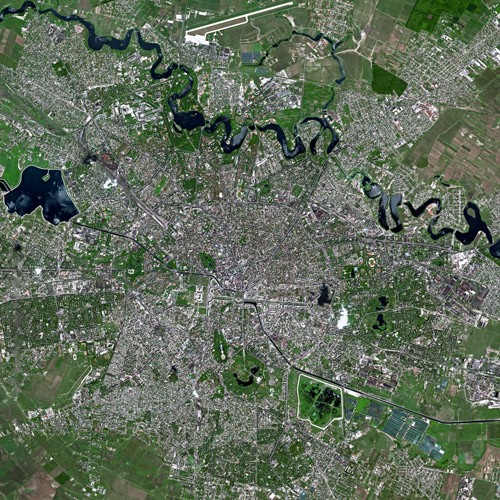
- Location within Bucharest, Romania
- Location: Băneasa, Sector 1, Bucharest
- Coordinates: 44.4923°N 26.0719°E
- Type: reservoir
- Primary inflows: Colentina River
- Primary outflows: Colentina River
- Basin countries: Romania
- Max. length: 3 km (1.9 mi)
- Max. width: 400 m (1,300 ft)
- Surface area: 40 ha (99 acres)
- Max. depth: 3 m (9.8 ft)
- Water volume: 630,000 m^{3} (510 acre⋅ft)

Lake Băneasa (Romanian: Lacul Băneasa) is a reservoir on the Colentina River at Băneasa in Sector 1 of Bucharest, Romania. The lake has a length of 3 kilometers (1.9 miles), a width between 50 meters (160 feet) and 400 meters (1,300 feet), a surface area of 40 hectares (0.40 km2), a depth between 1 meter (3.3 feet) and 3 meters (9.8 feet), a volume of 630,000 cubic meters (22,000,000 cubic feet) and a debit of 2.5 m/s.

== See also ==
- List of lakes in Bucharest
