= Colentina (river) =

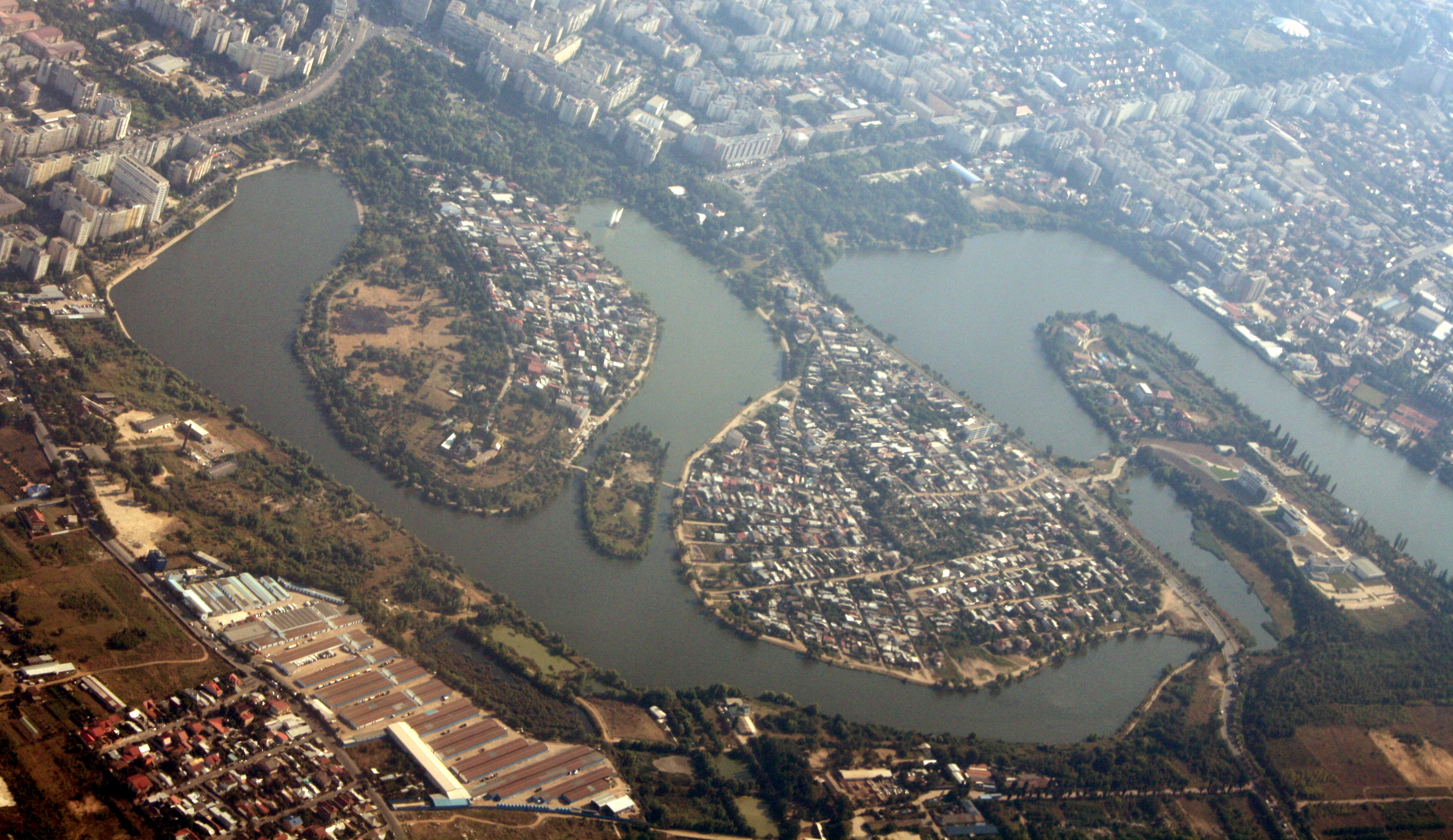

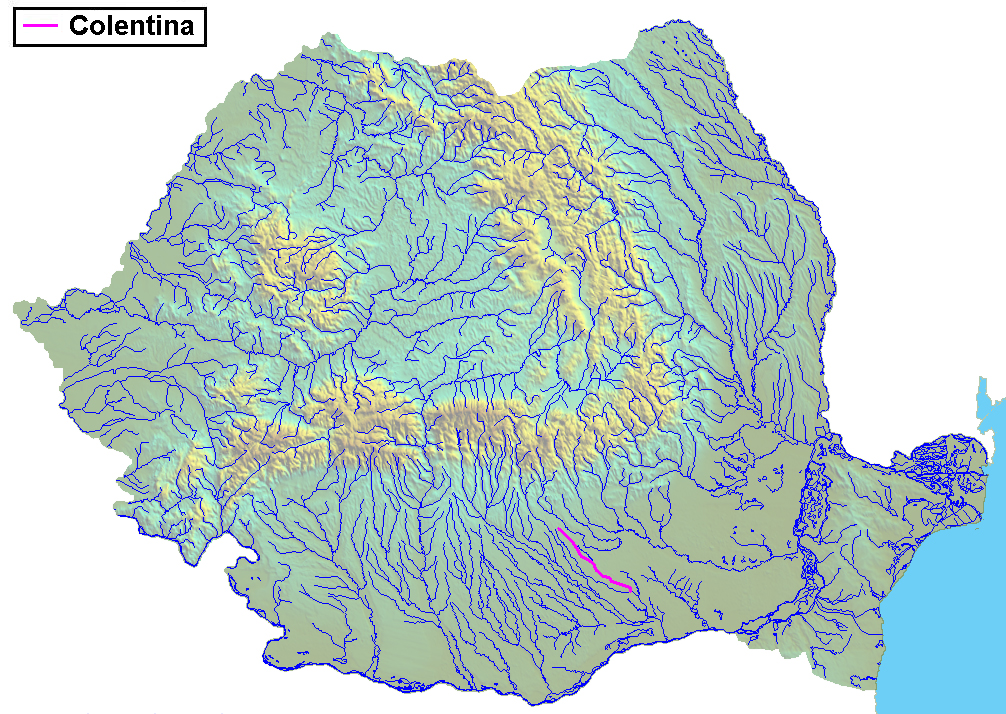

Location
- Country: Romania
- Counties: Dâmbovița, Bucharest, Ilfov

Physical characteristics
- Source: Near Cornățelu, Dâmbovița County
- Mouth: Dâmbovița
  - location: near Bălăceanca
  - coordinates: 44°23′56″N 26°17′16″E
- Length: 101 km (63 mi)
- Basin size: 643 km^{2} (248 sq mi)

Basin features
- Progression: Dâmbovița→ Argeș→ Danube→ Black Sea
- Tributaries
  - left: Baranga, Crevedia, Valea Saulei

The Colentina is a left tributary of the river Dâmbovița in Romania. It discharges into the Dâmbovița near Bălăceanca. It passes through the city of Bucharest and the villages and towns Călugăreni, Bălănești, Ghimpați, Ciocănești, Crevedia, Buftea, Mogoșoaia, Pantelimon, and Cernica. Its length is 101 km (63 mi) and its basin size is 643 km^{2} (248 sq mi).

The following lakes are built on the river:

- Lake Moarta
- Lake Ciocănești I
- Lake Ciocănești I
- Lake Crevedia VI
- Lake Buftea – 307 ha
- Lake Mogoșoaia – 66 ha
- Lake Chitila – 75 ha
- Lake Străulești – 39 ha
- Lake Grivița – 80 ha
- Lake Băneasa – 40 ha
- Lake Herăstrău – 77 ha
- Lake Floreasca – 70 ha
- Lake Tei – 80 ha
- Lake Plumbuita – 55 ha
- Lake Colentina – 26ha
- Lake Fundeni – 123 ha
- Lake Pantelimon I – 120 ha
- Lake Pantelimon II – 260 ha
- Lake Cernica – 360 ha
