= Cornățelu =

- Commune
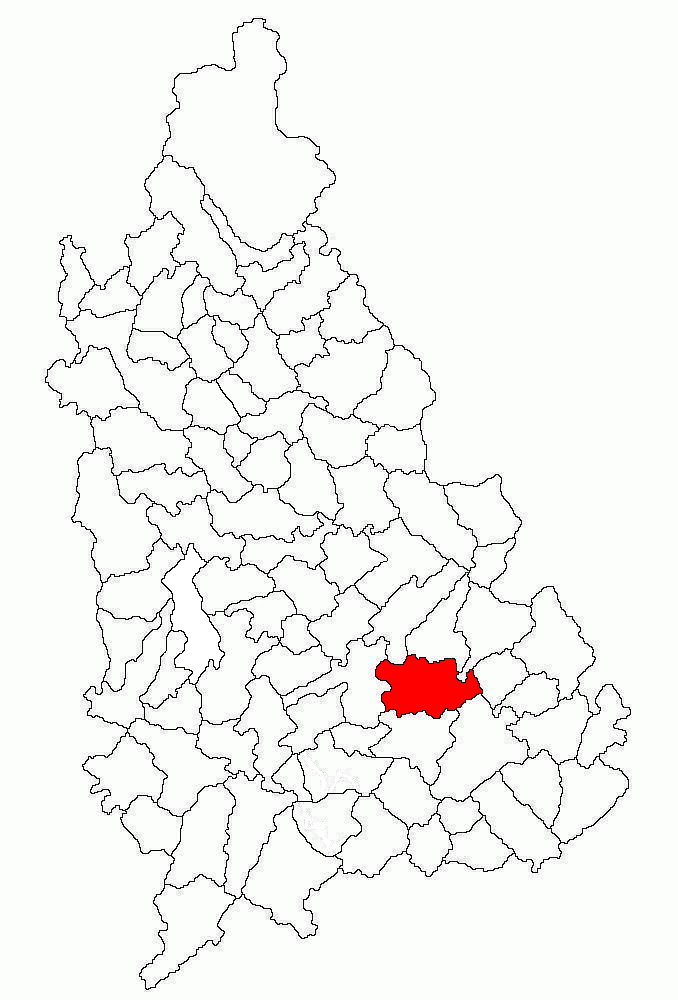
- Location in Dâmbovița County

- Location in Romania
- Coordinates: 44°45′N 25°40′E
- Country: Romania
- County: Dâmbovița

Government
  - Mayor (2020–2024): Florin-Nelu Ivan (PNL)
- Area: 63.86 km^{2} (24.66 sq mi)
- Elevation: 173 m (568 ft)
- Population (2021-12-01): 1,684
  - Density: 26/km^{2} (68/sq mi)
- Time zone: EET/EEST (UTC+2/+3)
- Postal code: 137145
- Area code: +(40) 245
- Vehicle reg.: DB
- Website: primariacornatelu.ro

Cornățelu is a commune in Dâmbovița County, Muntenia, Romania with a population of 1,684 as of 2021. It is composed of five villages: Alunișu, Bolovani, Cornățelu, Corni, and Slobozia.

Historical population
Year	Pop.	±%
2002	1,767	—
2011	1,675	−5.2%
2021	1,684	+0.5%
Source: Census data

== Natives ==
- Florica Petcu-Dospinescu (born 1951), rower
- Ilie Savu (1920–2010), footballer
