= Arena Națională =

Football stadium in Bucharest

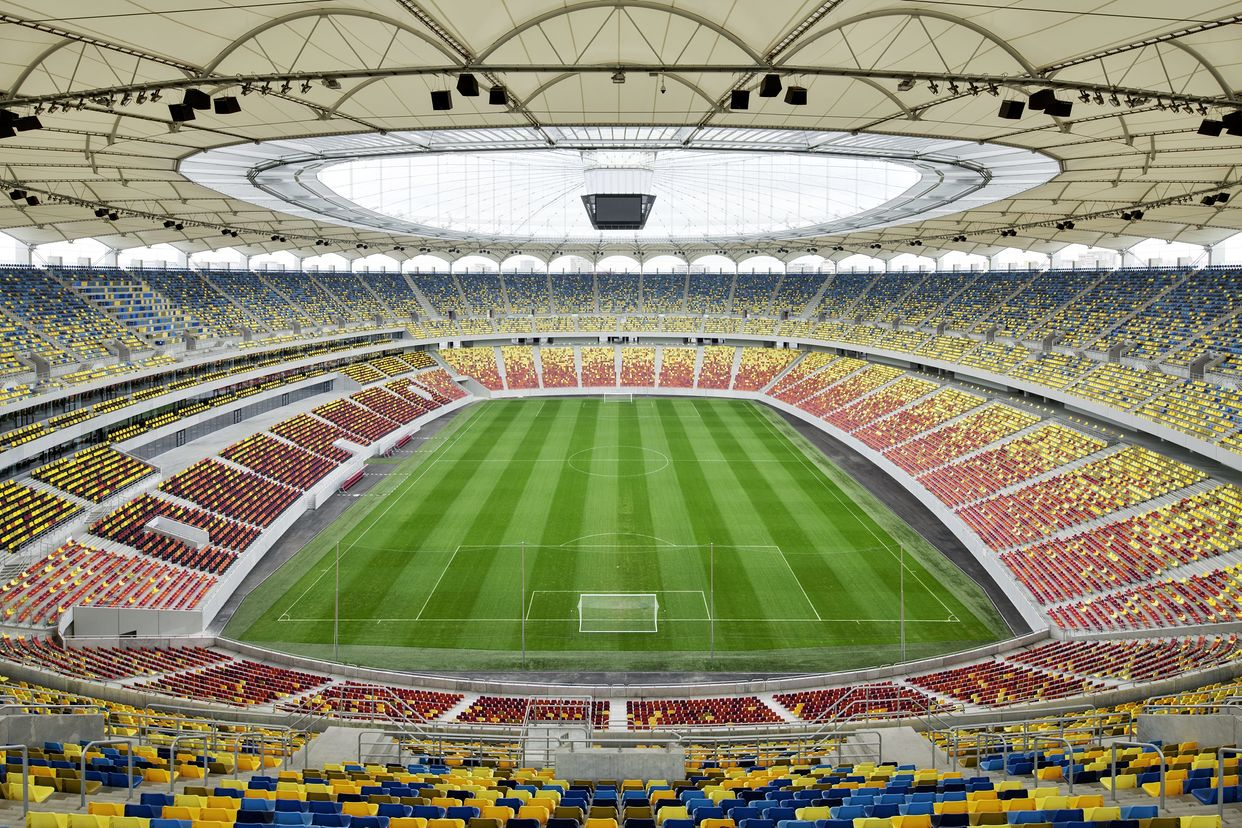
- UEFA
- Interactive map of Arena Națională
- Location: Bulevardul Basarabia 37-39, Bucharest, Romania
- Coordinates: 44°26′14″N 26°09′09″E
- Owner: Municipality of Bucharest
- Capacity: 55,634 (football)
- Executive suites: 42
- Roof: Retractable
- Surface: Hybrid pitch (Natural grass reinforced with synthetic fibers)
- Record attendance: 67,964 (Metallica, 13 May 2026)
- Field size: 105 x 68 m

Construction
- Groundbreaking: 20 February 2008
- Opened: 6 September 2011
- Cost: €234 million (€338 million in 2021 euros)
- Architect: Gerkan, Marg and Partners
- Main contractors: Max Bögl; Astaldi

Tenants
- Romania National Team (2011–present); FCSB (2015–present); FC Dinamo București (2025–present)

The National Arena (Romanian: Arena Națională) is a retractable roof football stadium in Bucharest, Romania. It opened in 2011 on the site of the original National Stadium, which was demolished between 2007 and 2008. The stadium hosts major football matches including home matches of the Romania National Football Team, and usually Romanian Cup Final. With 55,634 seats, it is the largest stadium in Romania.

Designed by Gerkan, Marg and Partners, the stadium was built by Max Bögl and Astaldi firms. The stadium has a retractable roof which covers the playing surface.

In addition to Romania home games and the Romanian Cup final, the stadium also hosts other major games in Romanian football, including the season-opening Supercupa României. A UEFA category four stadium, the National Arena hosted the 2012 UEFA Europa League final, and four games at UEFA Euro 2020 (including the Round of 16 match between France and Switzerland, ended in a 3–3 draw, with Switzerland defeating France 5–4 at penalties).

The stadium has also been used as the venue for The International 2021, the annual Dota 2 world championship event that still holds the Guinness World Records for the largest Esports prize pool for a single tournament ($40,018,195). Arena Națională has hosted concerts by Metallica, Guns N' Roses, Red Hot Chili Peppers, Depeche Mode, and Ed Sheeran.

On 15 September 2026, the UEFA Executive Committee officially designated the Arena Națională as the host venue for the 2028 UEFA Europa League final, scheduled to be played on 17 May 2028. The selection marks the second time the stadium will organize the competition's final act, 16 years after hosting the historic 2012 UEFA Europa League final between Atlético Madrid and Athletic Bilbao.

The Arena Națională is currently the home ground of FCSB, the biggest brand in Romanian football. FC Dinamo București also plays some selected matches at the Arena Națională.

== Construction ==
The old stadium was demolished between 18 December 2007 and 20 February 2008, although a symbolic removal of seats took place on 21 November 2007, after Romania defeated Albania 6–1 in a qualifying match for Euro 2008.

The construction phase generated some controversy over costs and delays, with Bucharest mayor Sorin Oprescu claiming that the works were 20 weeks behind schedule in May 2009. On 8 October 2009, it was decided that the stadium should also include a retractable roof worth €20,000,000.

Construction was temporarily halted in December 2009 due to unfavorable weather conditions.

== Facilities ==
The venue holds 55,634 people. 3,600 VIP seats are available, with another 126 seats allotted for the press (with a possible expansion to 548 seats). The stadium includes some 360 restrooms and a retractable roof, which can be opened or closed in 15 minutes. It is also endowed with a floodlight system and 2100 parking spaces. The stadium is also very similar to the Kazimierz Górski National Stadium in Warsaw, Poland, in terms of age, capacity and the roof.

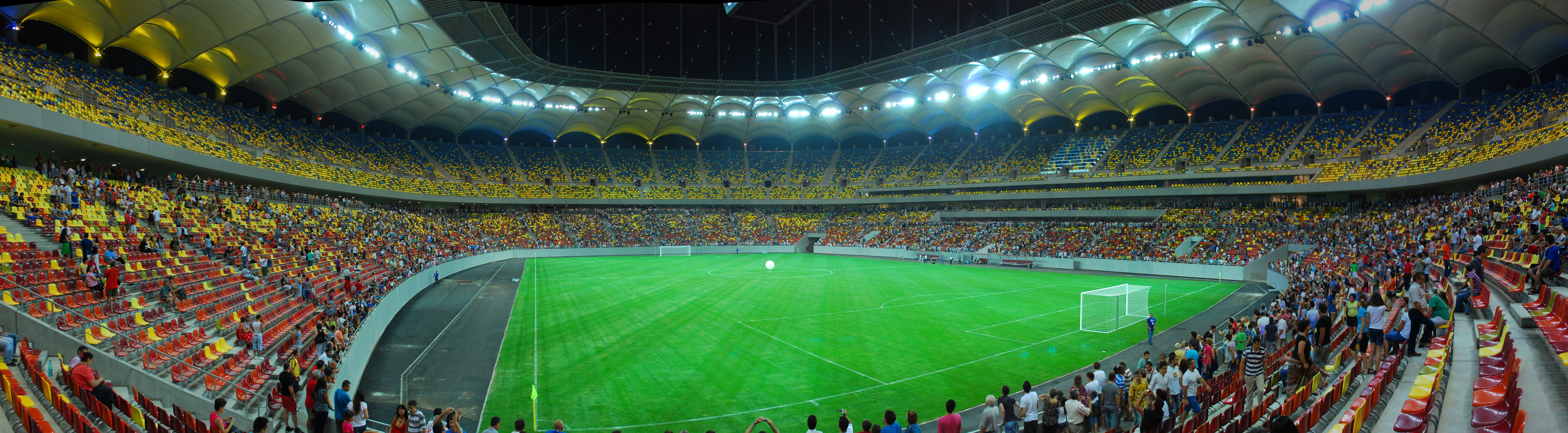
A panoramic view of the stadium

== Usage ==
The National Stadium is a Category 4 venue and as such, it hosted the UEFA Europa League 2011–12 final, as announced by UEFA at Nyon on 29 January 2009. It was required to host at least two major events beginning in July 2011, one with an attendance of 10,000 and the second with an attendance of at least 40,000.

The stadium also hosted The International 2021, the annual world championship for the video game Dota 2, in October 2021. This came after the original hosts, Sweden, did not classify esports as a sporting event, making it more difficult for players to procure visas to the country.

== History ==
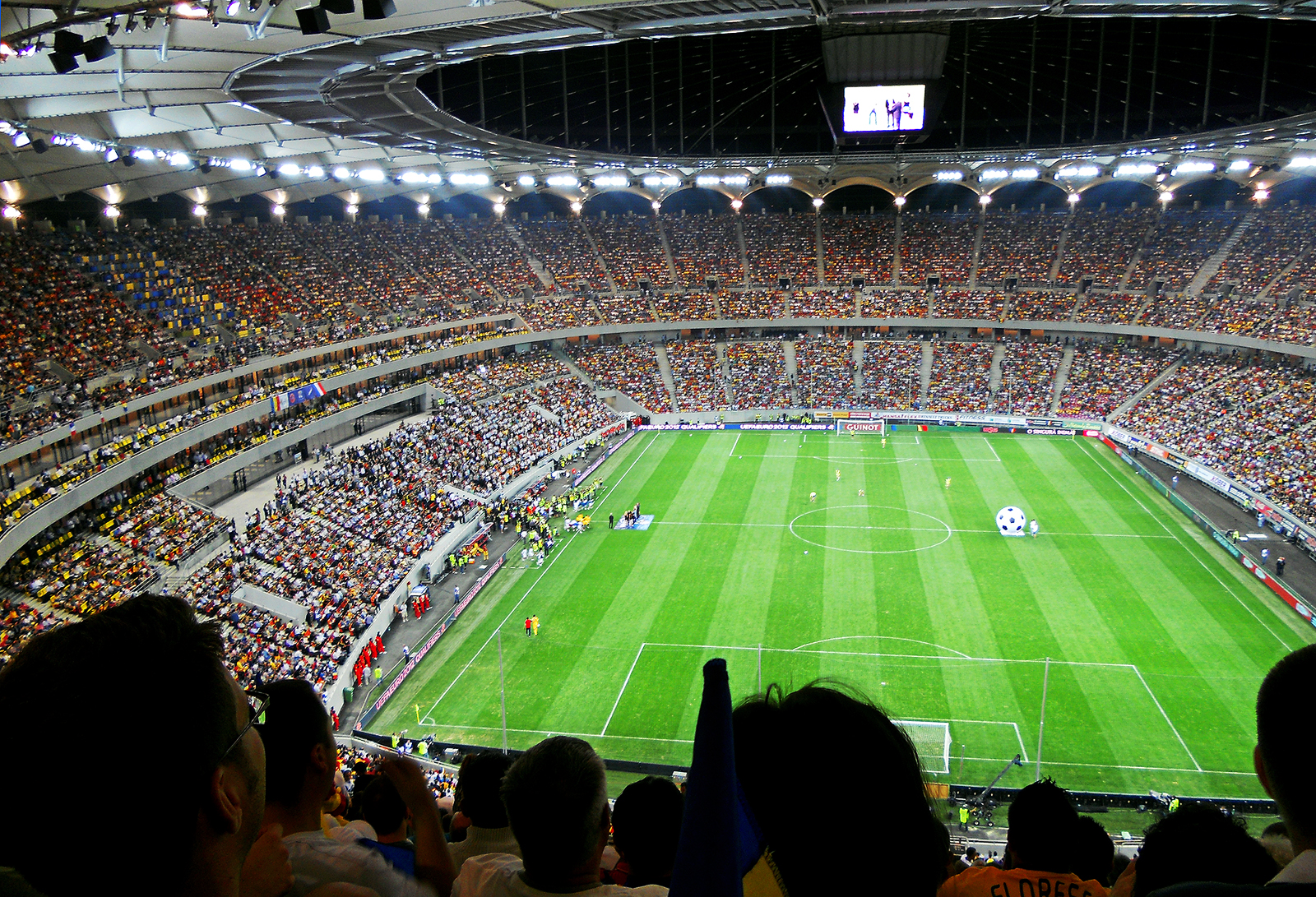
Romania-France opening match

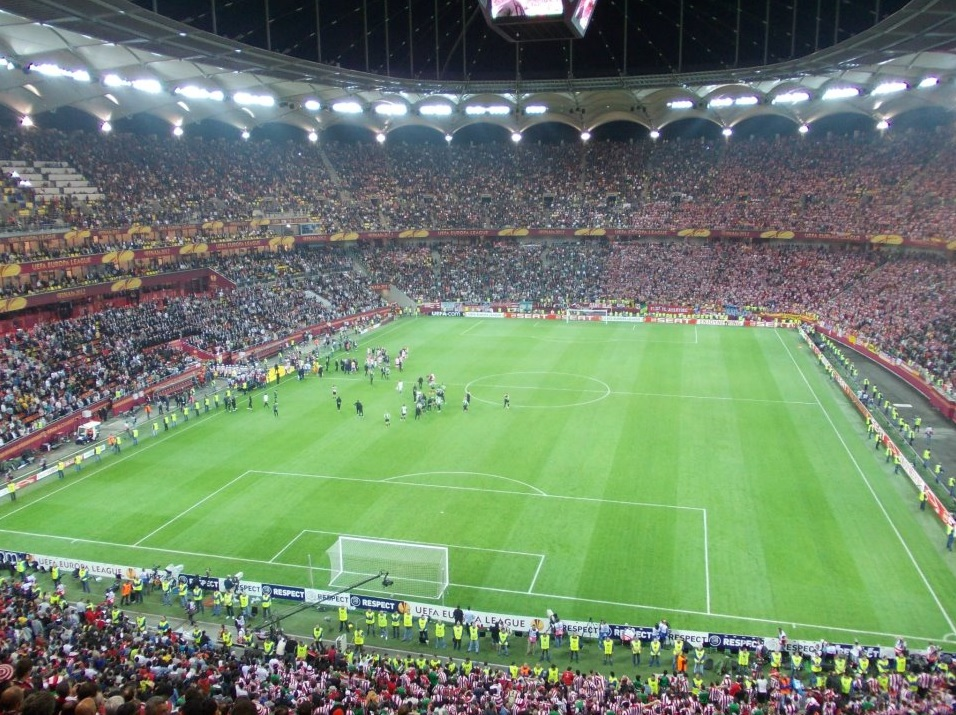
2012 UEFA Europa League final

The official inauguration was initially scheduled for 10 August 2011, and was to feature a football match between Romania and Argentina. However, on 26 July, Argentina officially cancelled the friendly match after their manager Sergio Batista departed the team.

The stadium was inaugurated on 6 September 2011, with a UEFA Euro 2012 Group D qualifier match between Romania and France. In the front of 49,137 fans, Romania and France drew 0–0. The result meant that Romania lost any chance of qualifying for the tournament, hosted by neighbours Ukraine and Poland.

=== Notable attendances ===
The highest audience for a football match was achieved at an exhibition game between Romania's "Golden Generation" and the "World Stars" team, ended with a 3–2 score, which brought 54.967 spectators at the stadium. It was the retirement match of arguably the best Romanian national team ever.

The second highest audience for a football game was achieved at the Liga 1 football match between FCSB and CFR Cluj hosted on 11 May 2024, which brought 54,673 people to the stadium.

Another large audience was hosted at the UEFA Europa League final on 9 May 2012. The game between the two Spanish teams, Atlético Madrid and Athletic Bilbao, brought 52,347 people to the stadium.

Another match with a notable audience was between Romania and Switzerland on 21 November 2023, in the qualifying stage of the UEFA Euro 2024 final tournament. With 50,224 people in the stands, Romania won 1–0, thus making it the winner of Group I and giving it a place in Pot 2 for the final tournament in Germany.

== Association football ==
International football clubs matches
Date	Competition	Home	Away	Score	Attendance
27 September 2011	UEFA Champions League	(Romania) Oțelul Galați	(Portugal) Benfica	0–1	6,824
29 September 2011	UEFA Europa League	(Romania) Rapid București	(Netherlands) PSV Eindhoven	1–3	21,320
18 October 2011	UEFA Champions League	(Romania) Oțelul Galați	(England) Manchester United	0–2	28,047
20 October 2011	UEFA Europa League	(Romania) Rapid București	(Poland) Legia Warsaw	0–1	13,726
3 November 2011	UEFA Europa League	(Romania) FCSB	(Israel) Maccabi Haifa	4–2	31,233
22 November 2011	UEFA Champions League	(Romania) Oțelul Galați	(Switzerland) Basel	2–3	5,797
30 November 2011	UEFA Europa League	(Romania) Rapid București	(Israel) Hapoel Tel Aviv	1–3	4,529
14 December 2011	UEFA Europa League	(Romania) FCSB	(Cyprus) AEK Larnaca	3–1	50,051
16 February 2012	UEFA Europa League	(Romania) FCSB	(Netherlands) Twente	0–1	49,588
9 May 2012	UEFA Europa League final	(Spain) Atlético Madrid	(Spain) Athletic Bilbao	3–0	52,347
2 August 2012	UEFA Europa League	(Romania) FCSB	(Slovakia) Spartak Trnava	0–1	23,494
9 August 2012	UEFA Europa League	(Romania) Rapid București	(Netherlands) Heerenveen	1–0	1,928
23 August 2012	UEFA Europa League	(Romania) Dinamo București	(Ukraine) Metalist Kharkiv	0–2	14,800
4 October 2012	UEFA Europa League	(Romania) FCSB	(Denmark) Copenhagen	1–0	48,694
25 October 2012	UEFA Europa League	(Romania) FCSB	(Norway) Molde	2–0	43,651
22 November 2012	UEFA Europa League	(Romania) FCSB	(Germany) Stuttgart	1–5	50,445
21 February 2013	UEFA Europa League	(Romania) FCSB	(Netherlands) Ajax	2–0 (4–2 p.)	35,423
7 March 2013	UEFA Europa League	(Romania) FCSB	(England) Chelsea	1–0	50,016
11 July 2013	UEFA Europa League	(Romania) Astra Giurgiu	(Slovenia) Domžale	2–0	1,513
16 July 2013	UEFA Champions League	(Romania) FCSB	(North Macedonia) Vardar	1–0	40,725
18 July 2013	UEFA Europa League	(Romania) Astra Giurgiu	(Cyprus) Omonia	1–1	2,164
6 August 2013	UEFA Champions League	(Romania) FCSB	(Georgia (country)) Dinamo Tbilisi	1–1	44,225
8 August 2013	UEFA Europa League	(Romania) Astra Giurgiu	(Slovakia) Trenčín	2–2	1,440
21 August 2013	UEFA Champions League	(Romania) FCSB	(Poland) Legia Warsaw	1–1	52,303
1 October 2013	UEFA Champions League	(Romania) FCSB	(England) Chelsea	0–4	36,713
22 October 2013	UEFA Champions League	(Romania) FCSB	(Switzerland) Basel	1–1	23,899
26 November 2013	UEFA Champions League	(Romania) FCSB	(Germany) Schalke 04	0–0	50,633
23 July 2014	UEFA Champions League	(Romania) FCSB	(Norway) Strømsgodset	2–0	18,043
6 August 2014	UEFA Champions League	(Romania) FCSB	(Kazakhstan) Aktobe	2–1	24,386
19 August 2014	UEFA Champions League	(Romania) FCSB	(Bulgaria) Ludogorets Razgrad	1–0	35,342
18 September 2014	UEFA Europa League	(Romania) FCSB	(Denmark) AaB	6–0	0
23 October 2014	UEFA Europa League	(Romania) FCSB	(Portugal) Rio Ave	2–1	15,753
11 December 2014	UEFA Europa League	(Romania) FCSB	(Ukraine) Dynamo Kyiv	0–2	7,620
22 July 2015	UEFA Champions League	(Romania) FCSB	(Slovakia) Trenčín	2–3	0
29 July 2015	UEFA Champions League	(Romania) FCSB	(Serbia) Partizan	1–1	0
20 August 2015	UEFA Europa League	(Romania) FCSB	(Norway) Rosenborg	0–3	21,204
3 August 2016	UEFA Champions League	(Romania) FCSB	(Czech Republic) Sparta Prague	2–0	37,127
16 August 2016	UEFA Champions League	(Romania) FCSB	(England) Manchester City	0–5	45,327
15 September 2016	UEFA Europa League	(Romania) Astra Giurgiu	Austria Wien	2–3	3,300
29 September 2016	UEFA Europa League	(Romania) FCSB	(Spain) Villarreal	1–1	13,231
20 October 2016	UEFA Europa League	(Romania) FCSB	(Switzerland) Zürich	1–1	13,154
3 November 2016	UEFA Europa League	(Romania) Astra Giurgiu	(Czech Republic) Viktoria Plzeň	1–1	1,450
24 November 2016	UEFA Europa League	(Romania) FCSB	(Turkey) Osmanlıspor	2–1	6,020
8 December 2016	UEFA Europa League	(Romania) Astra Giurgiu	(Italy) Roma	0–0	7,100
25 July 2017	UEFA Champions League	(Romania) FCSB	(Czech Republic) Viktoria Plzeň	2–2	33,795
27 July 2017	UEFA Europa League	(Romania) Dinamo București	(Spain) Athletic Bilbao	1–1	26,783
23 August 2017	UEFA Champions League	(Romania) FCSB	(Portugal) Sporting CP	1–5	49,220
14 September 2017	UEFA Europa League	(Romania) FCSB	(Czech Republic) Viktoria Plzeň	3–0	20,714
2 November 2017	UEFA Europa League	(Romania) FCSB	(Israel) Hapoel Be'er Sheva	1–1	27,134
7 December 2017	UEFA Europa League	(Romania) FCSB	(Switzerland) Lugano	1–2	13,231
15 February 2018	UEFA Europa League	(Romania) FCSB	(Italy) Lazio	1–0	33,455
2 August 2018	UEFA Europa League	(Romania) FCSB	(Slovenia) Rudar Velenje	4–0	7,030
16 August 2018	UEFA Europa League	(Romania) FCSB	(Croatia) Hajduk Split	2–1	27,410
30 August 2018	UEFA Europa League	(Romania) FCSB	(Austria) Rapid Wien	2–1	31,274
27 August 2020	UEFA Europa League	(Romania) FCSB	(Armenia) Shirak	3–0	0
23 February 2021	UEFA Champions League	(Spain) Atlético Madrid	(England) Chelsea	0–1	0
22 July 2021	UEFA Europa Conference League	(Romania) FCSB	(Kazakhstan) Shakhter Karagandy	1–0	5,812
28 July 2022	UEFA Europa Conference League	(Romania) FCSB	(Georgia (country)) Saburtalo Tbilisi	4–2	25,228
11 August 2022	UEFA Europa Conference League	(Romania) FCSB	(Slovakia) FC DAC 1904 Dunajská Streda	1–0	40,457
18 August 2022	UEFA Europa Conference League	(Romania) FCSB	(Norway) Viking FK	1–2	30,134
15 September 2022	UEFA Europa Conference League	(Romania) FCSB	(Belgium) Anderlecht	0–0	29,613
13 October 2022	UEFA Europa Conference League	(Romania) FCSB	(Denmark) Silkeborg	0–5	9,103
3 November 2022	UEFA Europa Conference League	(Romania) FCSB	(England) West Ham	0–3	20,172
26 September 2024	UEFA Europa League	(Romania) FCSB	(Latvia) FK RFS	4–1	34,257
7 November 2024	UEFA Europa League	(Romania) FCSB	(Denmark) FC Midtjylland	2–0	37,152
28 November 2024	UEFA Europa League	(Romania) FCSB	(Greece) Olympiacos	0–0	43,572
30 January 2025	UEFA Europa League	(Romania) FCSB	(England) Manchester United	0–2	50,128
20 February 2025	UEFA Europa League	(Romania) FCSB	(Greece) PAOK	2–0	50,248
6 March 2025	UEFA Europa League	(Romania) FCSB	(France) Olympique Lyon	1–3	53,028
30 July 2025	UEFA Champions League	(Romania) FCSB	(North Macedonia) KF Shkendija	1–2	32,457
7 August 2025	UEFA Europa League	(Romania) FCSB	(Kosovo) FC Drita	3–2	13,825
28 August 2025	UEFA Europa League	(Romania) FCSB	(Scotland) Aberdeen	3–0	35,341
2 October 2025	UEFA Europa League	(Romania) FCSB	(Switzerland) Young Boys	0–2	25.056
23 October 2025	UEFA Europa League	(Romania) FCSB	(Italy) Bologna	1–2	27.643
11 December 2025	UEFA Europa League	(Romania) FCSB	(Netherlands) Feyenoord	4–3	22.857
29 January 2026	UEFA Europa League	(Romania) FCSB	(Turkey) Fenerbahçe		

Notes

1. The match was played behind closed doors due to punishment by UEFA.
2. The match was played behind closed doors due to COVID-19 pandemic.

=== Romania national football team matches ===
On 6 September 2011, the Romania national football team, played the opening match against the French team which ended with a goalless draw, after Argentina cancelled the official inauguration, a friendly match between Romania and Argentina on 10 August 2011.

Nr	Competition	Date	Opponent	Attendance	Result	Scorers for Romania
1	UEFA Euro 2012 qualifying	6 September 2011	France	49,137	0–0	–
2	UEFA Euro 2012 qualifying	7 October 2011	Belarus	29,846	2–2	2 x Adrian Mutu
3	Friendly	29 February 2012	Uruguay	15,000	1–1	Bogdan Stancu
4	2014 FIFA World Cup qualification	11 September 2012	Andorra	24,630	4–0	Gabriel Torje, Costin Lazăr, Valerică Găman, Alexandru Maxim
5	2014 FIFA World Cup qualification	16 October 2012	Netherlands	53,329	1–4	Ciprian Marica
6	Friendly	14 November 2012	Belgium	5,000	2–1	Alexandru Maxim, Gabriel Torje
7	Friendly	4 June 2013	Trinidad and Tobago	10,128	4–0	3 x Ciprian Marica
8	Friendly	14 August 2013	Slovakia	6,738	1–1	Bogdan Stancu
9	2014 FIFA World Cup qualification	6 September 2013	Hungary	41,405	3–0	Ciprian Marica, Mihai Pintilii, Cristian Tănase
10	2014 FIFA World Cup qualification	10 September 2013	Turkey	44,357	0–2	–
11	2014 FIFA World Cup qualification	15 October 2013	Estonia	18,852	2–0	2 x Ciprian Marica
12	2014 FIFA World Cup qualification	19 November 2013	Greece	49,793	1–1	–
13	Friendly	5 March 2014	Argentina	45,034	0–0	–
14	UEFA Euro 2016 qualifying	11 October 2014	Hungary	50,085	1–1	Raul Rusescu
15	UEFA Euro 2016 qualifying	14 November 2014	Northern Ireland	28,892	2–0	2 x Paul Papp
16	Friendly	18 November 2014	Denmark	10,000	2–0	2 x Claudiu Keșerü
17	UEFA Euro 2016 qualifying	7 September 2015	Greece	38,153	0–0	–
18	UEFA Euro 2016 qualifying	8 October 2015	Finland	47,987	1–1	Ovidiu Hoban
19	Friendly	3 June 2016	Georgia	27,937	5–1	Adrian Popa, Nicolae Stanciu, Gabriel Torje, Claudiu Keșerü
20	2018 FIFA World Cup qualification	11 November 2016	Poland	48,531	0–3	–
21	2018 FIFA World Cup qualification	1 September 2017	Armenia	27,178	1–0	Alexandru Maxim
22	Friendly	14 November 2017	Netherlands	26,000	0–3	–
23	2018–19 UEFA Nations League	14 October 2018	Serbia	48,513	0–0	–
24	UEFA Euro 2020 qualifying	5 September 2019	Spain	50,024	1–2	Florin Andone
25	UEFA Euro 2020 qualifying	15 October 2019	Norway	29,854	1–1	Alexandru Mitriță
26	UEFA Euro 2020 qualifying	15 November 2019	Sweden	49,678	0–2	–
27	2020–21 UEFA Nations League	4 September 2020	Northern Ireland	0	1–1	George Pușcaș
28	2022 FIFA World Cup qualification	25 March 2021	North Macedonia	0	3–2	Florin Tănase, Valentin Mihăilă, Ianis Hagi
29	2022 FIFA World Cup qualification	28 March 2021	Germany	0	0–1	–
30	2022 FIFA World Cup qualification	5 September 2021	Liechtenstein	9,404	2–0	Alin Toșca, Cristian Manea
31	UEFA Euro 2024 qualifying	28 March 2023	Belarus	27,837	2–1	Andrei Burcă, Nicolae Stanciu
32	UEFA Euro 2024 qualifying	9 September 2023	Israel	49,123	1–1	Denis Alibec
33	UEFA Euro 2024 qualifying	12 September 2023	Kosovo	29,982	2–0	Nicolae Stanciu, Valentin Mihăilă
34	UEFA Euro 2024 qualifying	15 October 2023	Andorra	21,723	4–0	Nicolae Stanciu, Ianis Hagi, Răzvan Marin, Florinel Coman
35	UEFA Euro 2024 qualifying	21 November 2023	Switzerland	50,224	1–0	Denis Alibec
36	Friendly	22 March 2024	Northern Ireland	30,439	1–1	Dennis Man
37	2024–25 UEFA Nations League	15 November 2024	Kosovo	48,957	3–0 (Note: The Romania v Kosovo match was suspended at 0–0 during second-half stoppage time, after Romanian supporters allegedly began chanting pro-Serbian and anti-Kosovo slogans. The Kosovo team left the pitch, with the match abandoned thereafter. On 20 November 2024, UEFA announced the match had been awarded as a 3–0 win for Romania.)	–
38	2024–25 UEFA Nations League	18 November 2024	Cyprus	45,318	4–1	Daniel Bîrligea, 2 x Răzvan Marin, Florinel Coman
39	2026 FIFA World Cup qualification	21 March 2025	Bosnia and Herzegovina	49,413	0–1	–
40	2026 FIFA World Cup qualification	10 June 2025	Cyprus	43,524	2–0	Dennis Man, Florin Tănase
41	Friendly	5 September 2025	Canada	29,125	0–3	–
42	Friendly	9 October 2025	Moldova	11,232	2–1	Louis Munteanu, Ianis Hagi
43	2026 FIFA World Cup qualification	12 October 2025	Austria	39,581	1–0	Virgil Ghiță
44	2026–27 UEFA Nations League	28 September 2026	Bosnia and Herzegovina	0	2–4	Daniel Bîrligea, Alexandru Cicâldău
45	2026–27 UEFA Nations League	5 October 2026	Sweden	49,426	0–1	–
46	2026–27 UEFA Nations League	14 November 2026	Poland		–	

Notes

1. The match was played behind closed doors due to COVID-19 pandemic.

=== Euro 2020 matches ===
Arena Națională was one of the stadiums that hosted matches for the UEFA Euro 2020. Three Group C matches and a Round of 16 game were played there.

Date	Time (EEST)	Team #1	Result	Team #2	Round	Attendance
13 June 2021	19:00	Austria	3–1	North Macedonia	Group C	9,082
17 June 2021	16:00	Ukraine	2–1	North Macedonia	Group C	10,001
21 June 2021	19:00	Ukraine	0–1	Austria	Group C	10,472
28 June 2021	22:00	France	3–3 (a.e.t.) (4–5 p)	Switzerland	Round of 16	22,642

== Concerts ==
List of concerts at Arena Națională, showing date, artist, tour and attendance
Date	Artist	Tour	Attendance	Revenue	Ref.
31 August 2012	(United States) Red Hot Chili Peppers	I'm with You World Tour	34,729		
15 May 2013	(United Kingdom) Depeche Mode	Delta Machine Tour	44,729		
17 June 2017	(United States) Kings of Leon	Walls Tour	16,000		
3 July 2019	(United Kingdom) Ed Sheeran	÷ Tour	48,044		
14 August 2019	(United States) Metallica	WorldWired Tour	50,319		
16 July 2023	(United States) Guns N' Roses	We're F'N' Back! Tour	42,000		
26 July 2023	(United Kingdom) Depeche Mode	Memento Mori World Tour	46,634		
12 June 2024	(United Kingdom) Coldplay	Music of the Spheres World Tour	105,420		
13 June 2024	(United Kingdom) Coldplay	Music of the Spheres World Tour	105,420		
24 August 2024	(United Kingdom) Ed Sheeran	+-=÷x Tour	57,444		
13 May 2026	(United States) Metallica	M72 World Tour	62.800 / 62.800	$9.300.000	Highest revenue ever at the stadium and in the country for a single concert. Largest attendance for a show at the National Stadium.
23 May 2026	(Belarus) Max Korzh		40,000		
28 May 2026	(United Kingdom) Iron Maiden	Run for Your Lives World Tour	32,000		

== Transport ==
The stadium is served by public transport with buses, trolleybuses, trams and the subway system. The nearest subway station (Piata Muncii) is about 1.7 km away (a 22-minute walk).

Transport means	Stadium entrance	Routes
Transport in Bucharest	Strada Pierre de Coubertin / Peluza I NORD	Trolleybuses routes → 75, 80, 86, 87, 90 – 100 metre walk to stadium entrance Bus routes → 104 – 300 metre walk to stadium entrance Trams routes → 5, 14, 46, 55 – 500 metre walk to stadium entrance Bus routes → 101, 143, 335, N102 – 550 metre walk to stadium entrance Trams routes → 14, 36 – 600 metre walk to stadium entrance Trolleybuses routes → 69, 82, 85 – 1400 metre walk to stadium entrance Bus routes → 143, 382, 383, 682 – 1400 metre walk to stadium entrance
Transport in Bucharest	Bulevardul Basarabia / Peluza II SUD	Trams routes → 40, 56 – 250 metre walk to stadium entrance Bus routes → N109 – 250 metre walk to stadium entrance Trams routes → 36 – 750 metre walk to stadium entrance Bus routes → 101, 102, 253, 335 – 750 metre walk to stadium entrance Trolleybuses routes → 70, 79, 80, 92 – 800 metre walk to stadium entrance Bus routes → N104 – 800 metre walk to stadium entrance Metro routes → M1: Piața Muncii – 1400 metre walk to stadium entrance Trams routes → 1 – 1500 metre walk to stadium entrance Bus routes → 135, 253, 311, 330 – 1500 metre walk to stadium entrance Metro routes → M1: Costin Georgian – 1500 metre walk to stadium entrance Bus routes → 104 – 1500 metre walk to stadium entrance
Transport in Bucharest	Strada Maior Ion Coravu / Tribuna I VEST	Trams routes → 40, 56 – 500 metre walk to stadium entrance Bus routes → N109 – 500 metre walk to stadium entrance Trolleybuses routes → 75, 80, 86, 87, 90 – 600 metre walk to stadium entrance Bus routes → 104, 143 – 600 metre walk to stadium entrance Trams routes → 1, 10, 34 – 1100 metre walk to stadium entrance Bus routes → 135, 311, 330 – 1100 metre walk to stadium entrance Metro routes → M1: Piața Muncii – 1500 metre walk to stadium entrance Trolleybuses routes → 70, 79, 80, 92 – 1500 metre walk to stadium entrance
Transport in Bucharest	Strada Socului / Tribuna II EST	Trams routes → 36, 46 – 500 metre walk to stadium entrance Bus routes → 101, 335 – 500 metre walk to stadium entrance Trams routes → 14, 46, 55 – 800 metre walk to stadium entrance Bus routes → 104 – 850 metre walk to stadium entrance Bus routes → 102, N109 – 950 metre walk to stadium entrance Trams routes → 40, 56 – 950 metre walk to stadium entrance Bus routes → 253 – 1400 metre walk to stadium entrance Bus routes → N104 – 1500 metre walk to stadium entrance Trolleybuses routes → 70, 79, 80, 92 – 1500 metre walk to stadium entrance

== See also ==
- Stadionul Steaua
- Stadionul Arcul de Triumf
- Stadionul Rapid
- List of football stadiums in Romania
- Kazimierz Górski National Stadium
- Waldstadion

== Notes ==
Preceded by Aviva Stadium; Dublin	UEFA Europa League; Final venue 2012	Succeeded by Amsterdam Arena; Amsterdam
