= Iancului =

District of Bucharest, Romania

Coordinates: 44.441394°N 26.133728°E

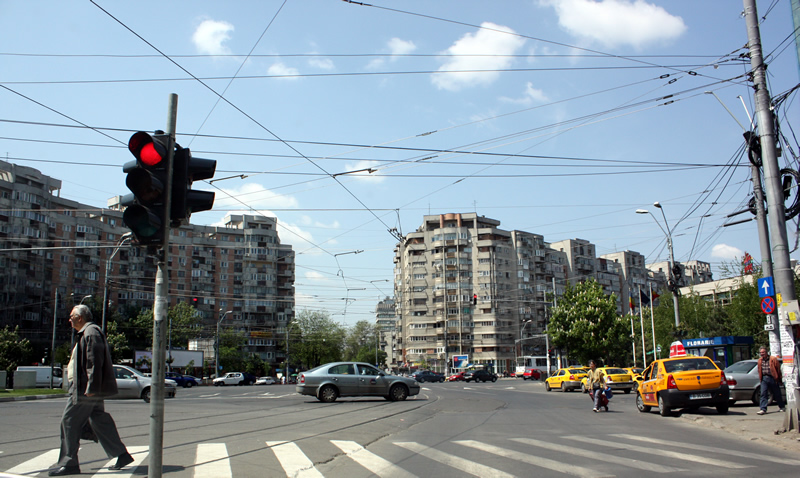
Piața Iancului

Iancului is the name of a district in Sector 2 situated in the northeastern part of Bucharest, the capital of Romania. Piața Iancului is also the name of an intersection in the same district, and has a connection to the Piața Iancului metro station. The name "Iancu" comes from a Romanian revolutionary, Avram Iancu.

The main artery crossing the district is national road DN3; to the east of Piața Iancului, this is known as Pache Protopopescu Boulevard, and to the west, it is known as Iancului Boulevard. The road intersects at Piața Iancului with Șoseaua Mihai Bravu.
