= Piața Muncii metro station =

Bucharest metro station

Piața Muncii
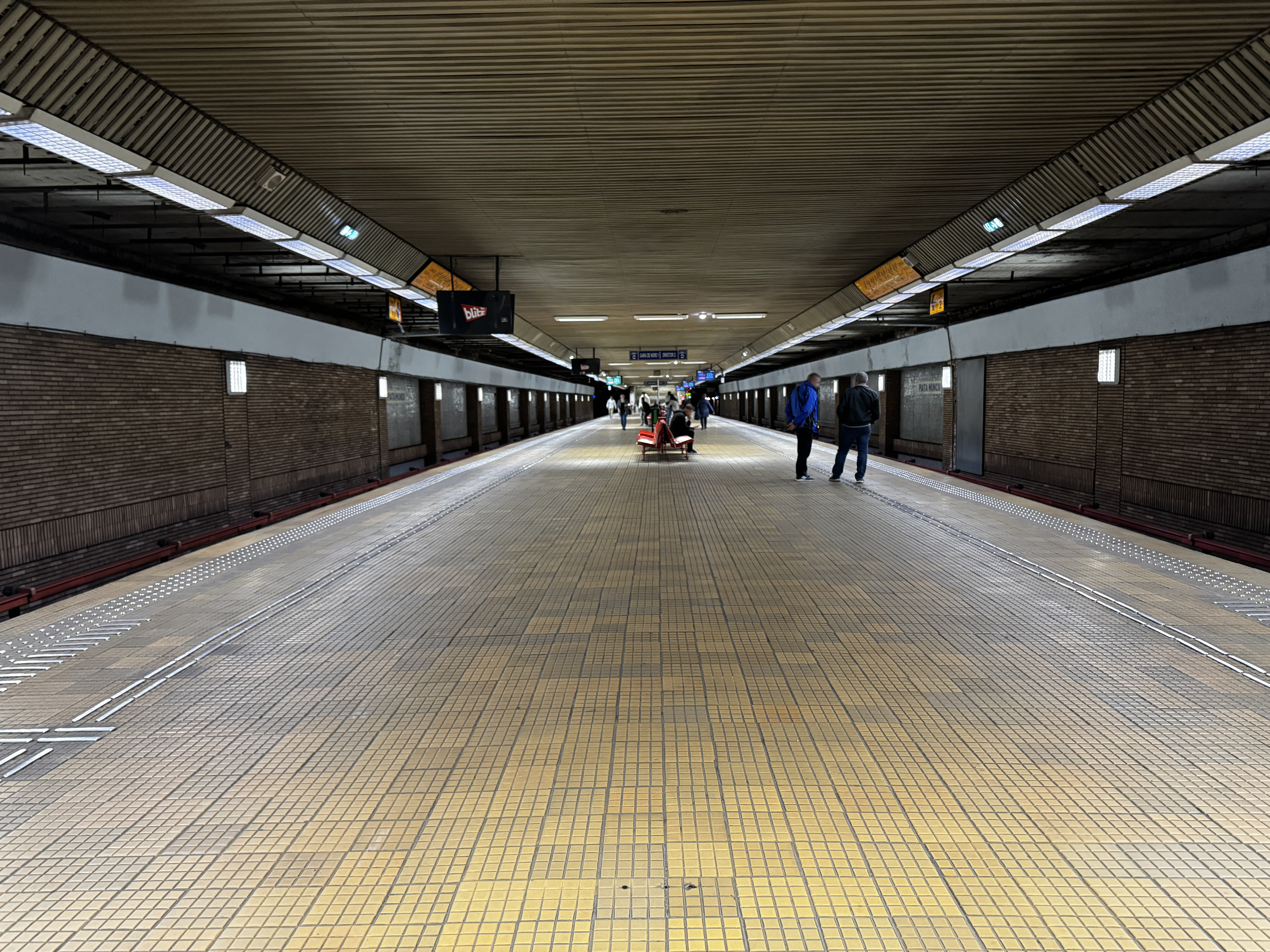
- Station

General information
- Location: Piața Muncii; Sector 3, Bucharest; Romania
- Coordinates: 44°25′57″N 26°08′18″E
- Platforms: 1 island platform
- Tracks: 2
- Tram routes: 1, 10
- Bus routes: 104, 640

Construction
- Structure type: Underground

History
- Opened: 17 August 1989

Services
Preceding station	Bucharest Metro	Following station
Dristor 2 Terminus	Line M1	Piața Iancului towards Republica
Location

Piața Muncii (Labour Square in English) is a metro station in Bucharest, Romania. The station is named after the old name of the square where it is located (the current name being Piața Hurmuzachi). The station is near the Arena Națională, on a junction. The nearby STB lines are: 40 (tram lines) and 104 (bus line). The N109 night bus also serves the station.

The station was opened on 17 August 1989 as part of the extension from Gara de Nord to Dristor.
