= Transport in Bucharest =

Public transportation opeated by TPBI in Bucharest

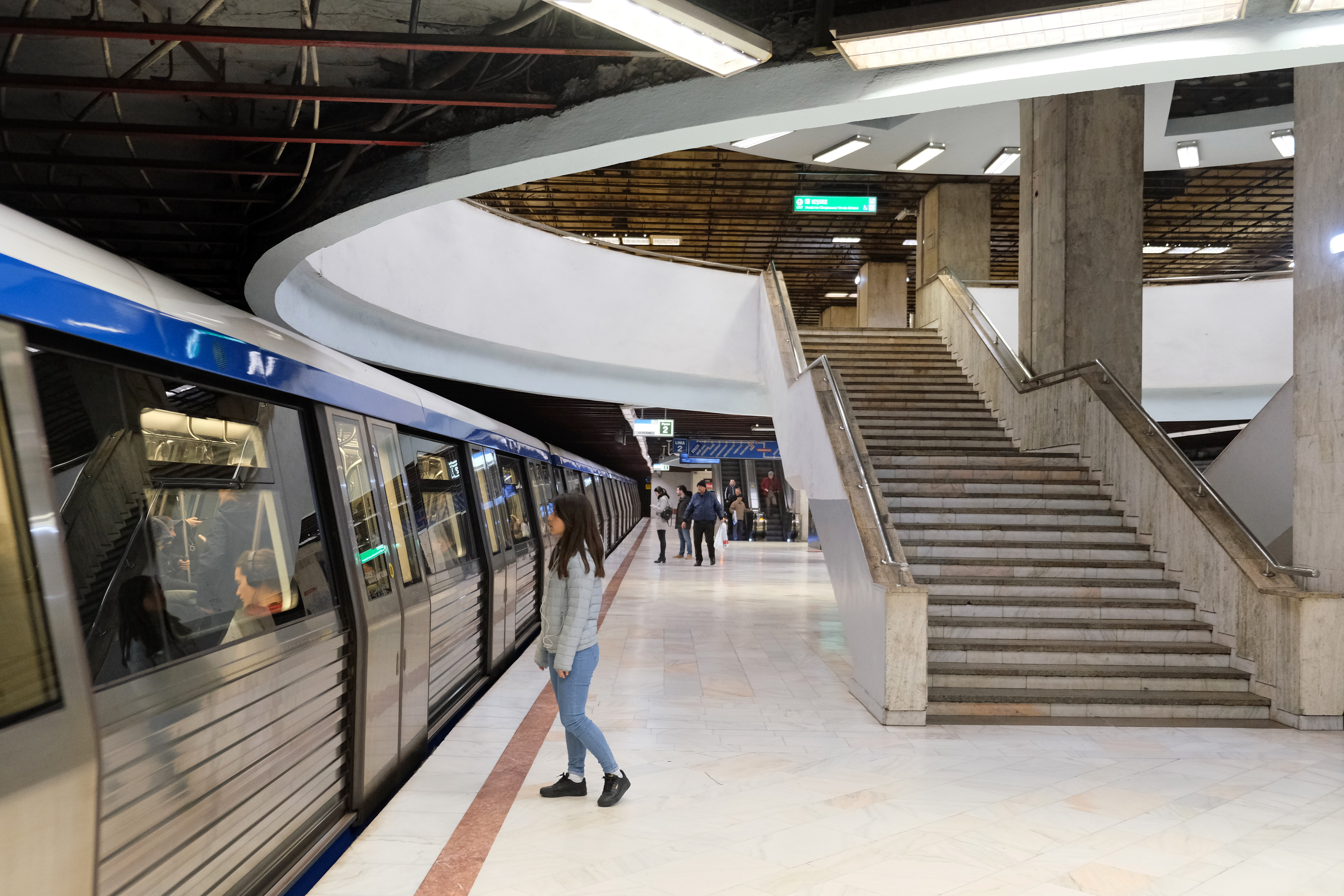
CAF metro train at Universitate metro station

Bucharest has the largest transport network in Romania, and one of the largest in Europe. The Bucharest transport network is made up of a metro network and a surface transport network. Although there are multiple connection points, the two systems operate independently of each other, and are run by different organisations (the metro is run by Metrorex and the surface transport network by Bucharest-Ilfov Intercommunity Development Association for Public Transport. The two companies used separate ticketing systems until 2021, when a new smart-card was introduced alongside the old tickets, which allows travel on both the TPBI and the Underground.

== Bucharest Metro ==
Bucharest has a fairly extensive metro system consisting of five lines (M1, M2, M3, M4, and M5) ran by Metrorex. In total, the network is 80.1 km (49.8 mi) long and has 64 stations, with 1.5 km (0.9 mi) average distance between stops. It is one of the fastest ways to get around the city. The oldest metro line is M1, which was opened in 1979. The newest metro line is M5, which was opened in 2020. A sixth metro line, M6 line, is currently under construction.

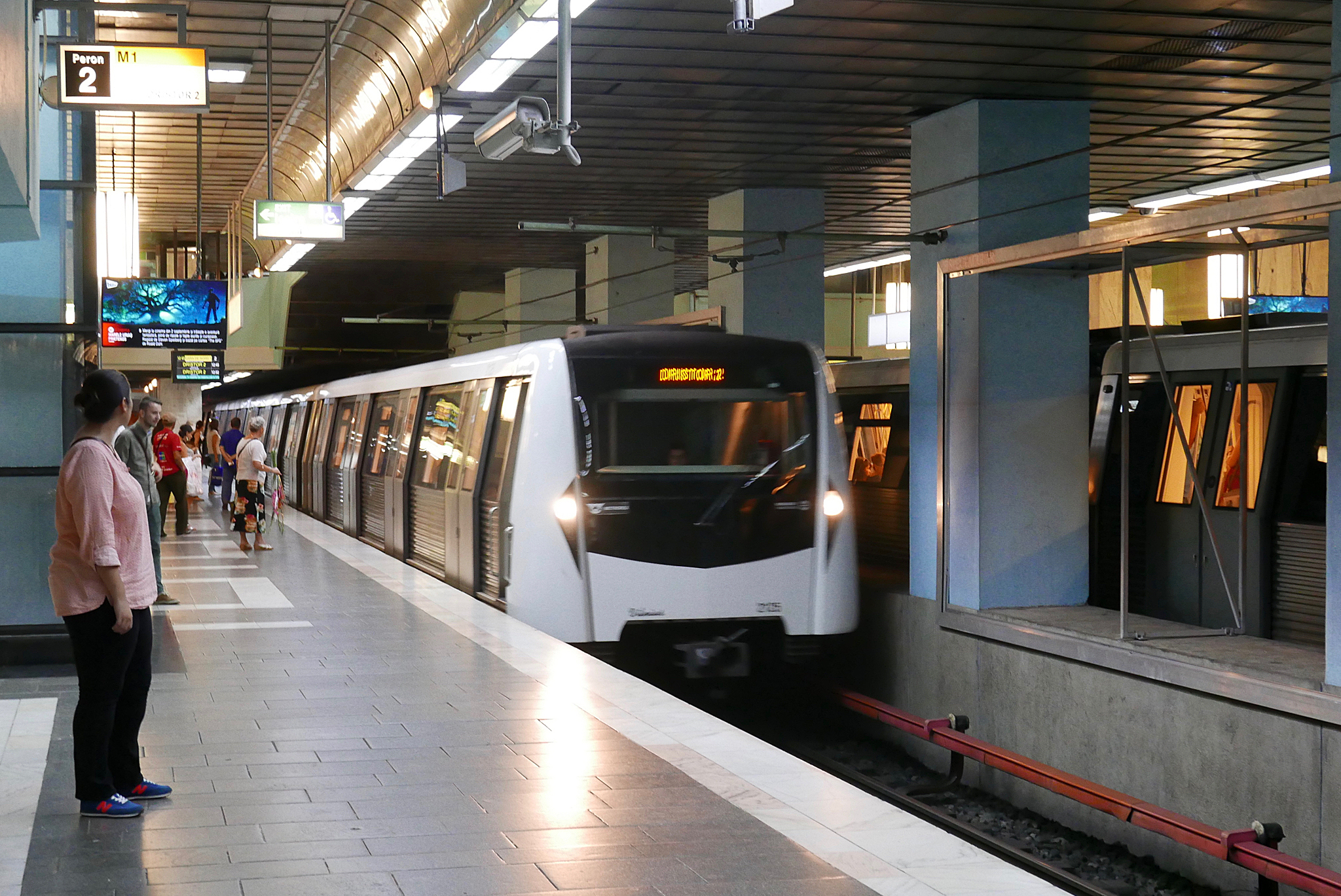
Bombardier Movia 346 metro train entering Gara de Nord metro station

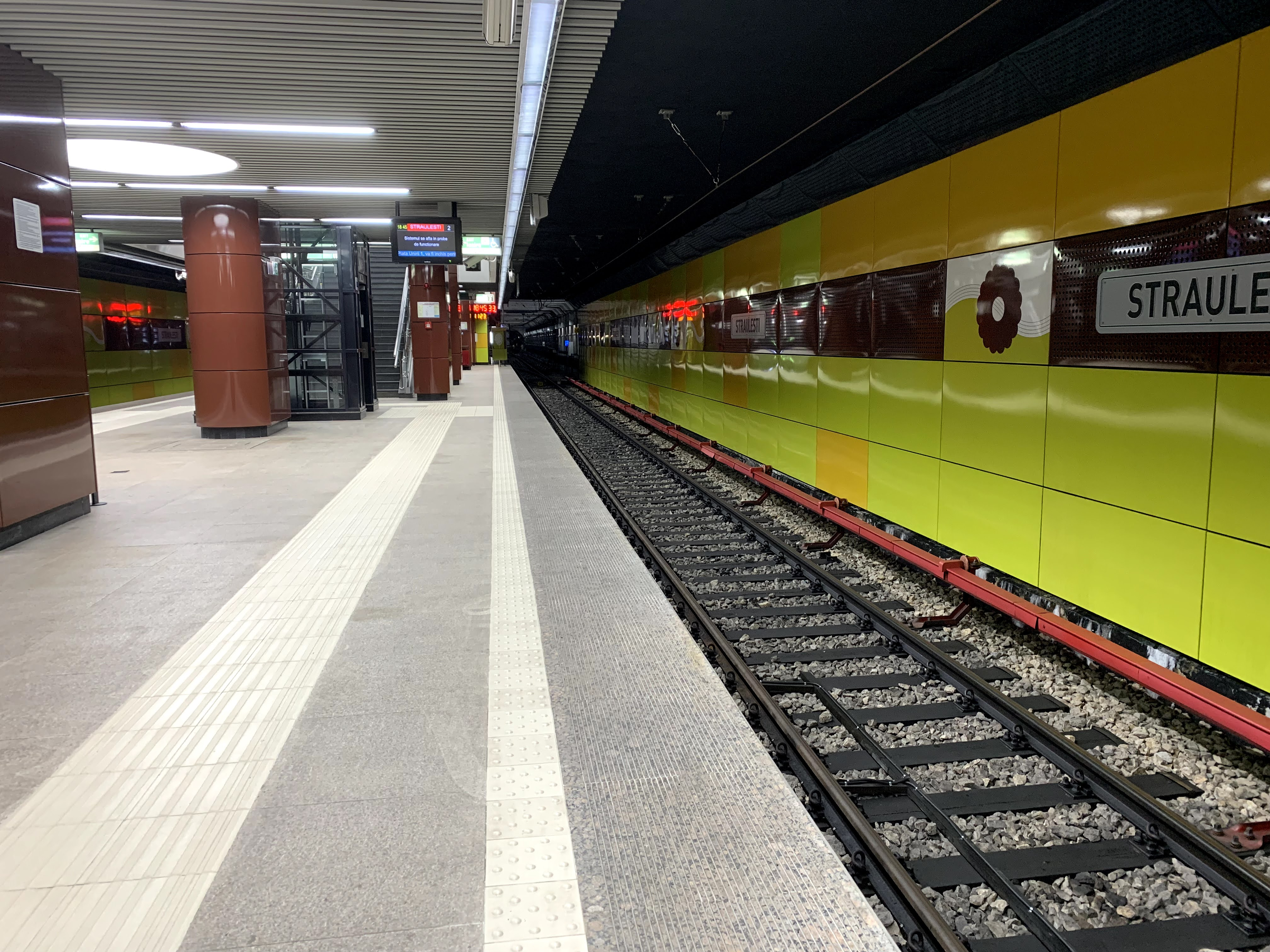
Străulești metro station, which was added to M4 line in 2017

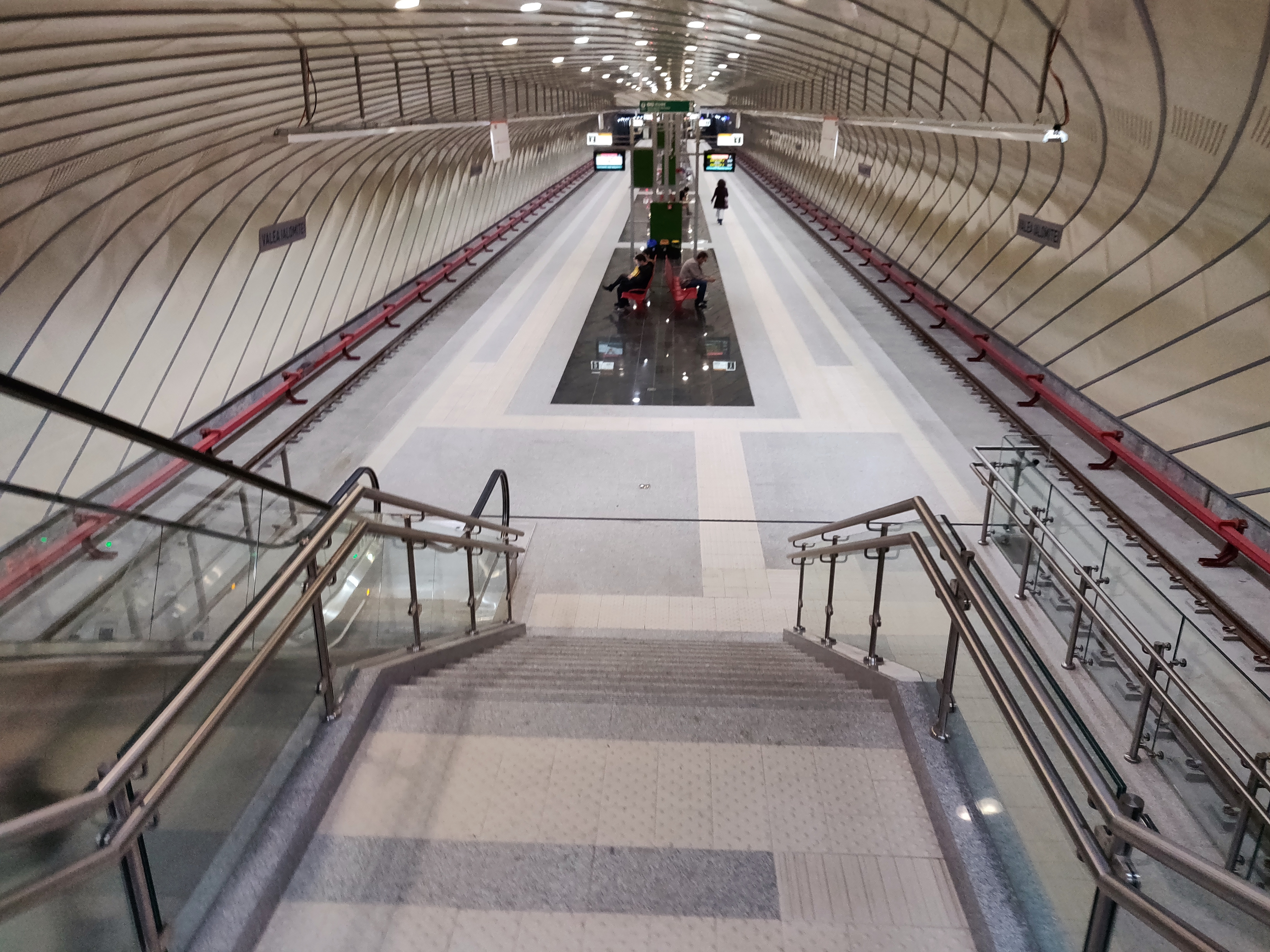
Valea Ialomiței metro station of M5 line, which is the newest metro line of Bucharest Metro, opened in 2020

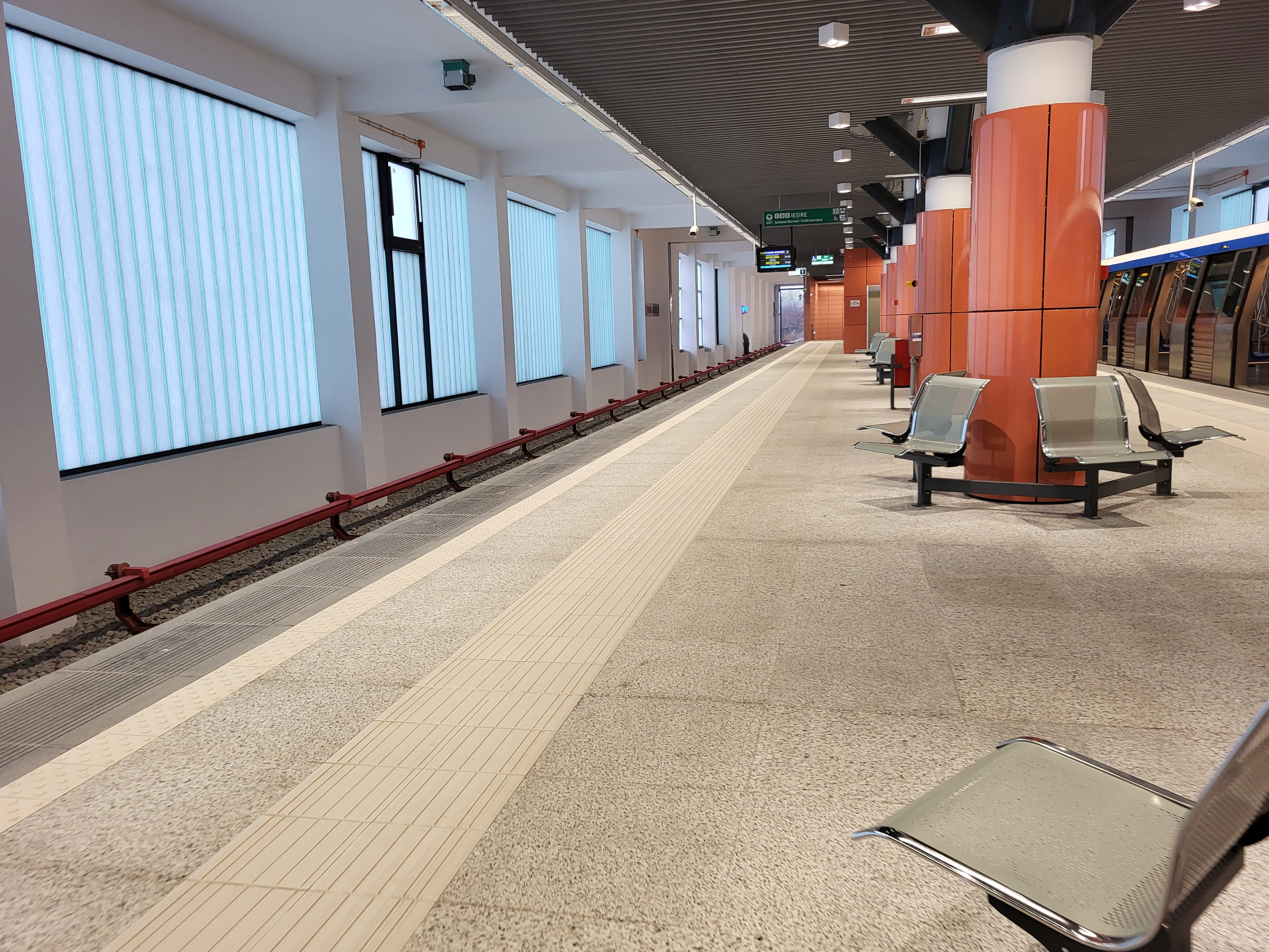
Tudor Arghezi metro station, which was added to M2 line in 2023, being the newest metro station to date

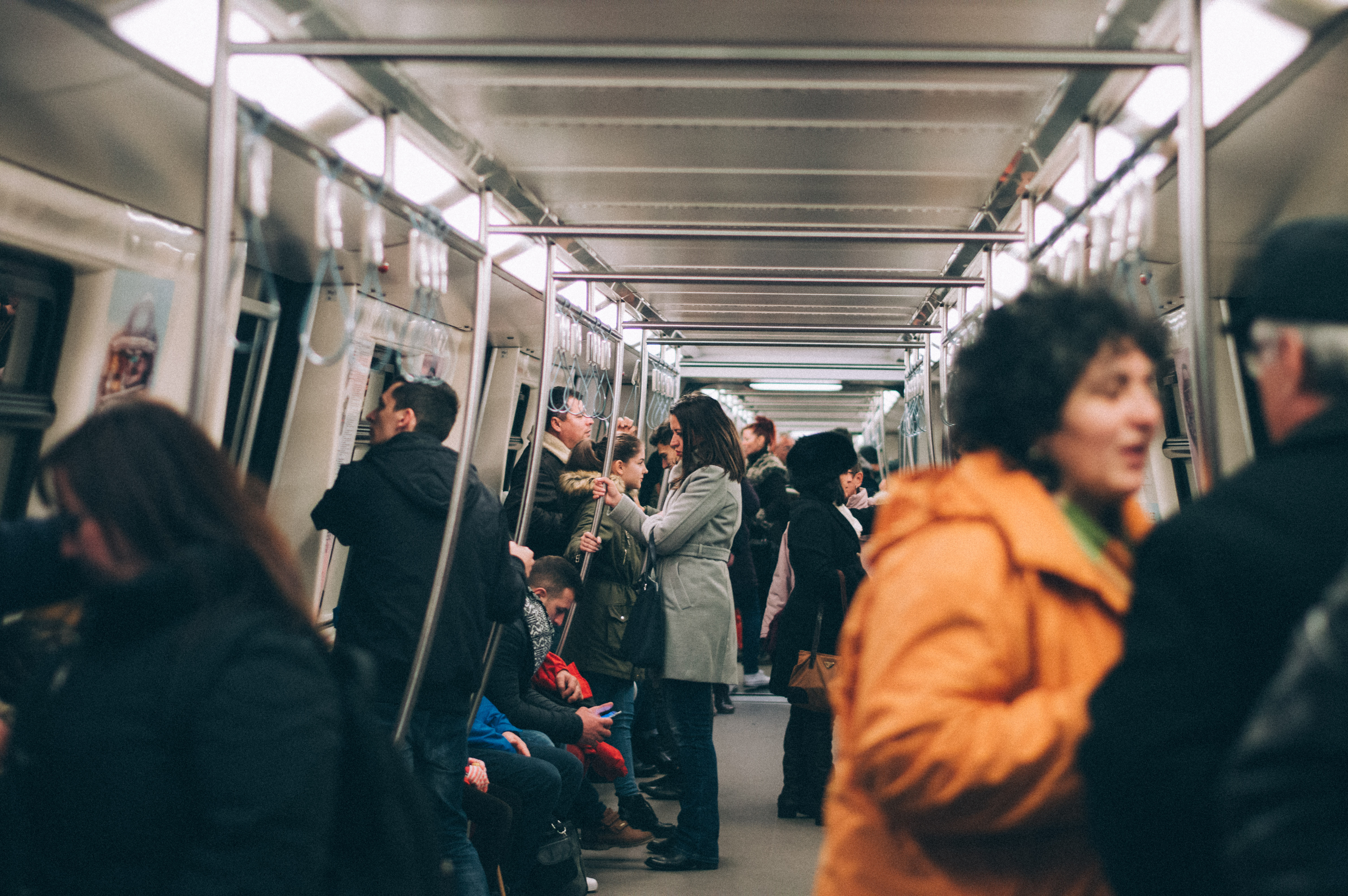
Interior of a metro train

Map of Bucharest Metro stations, also showing M6 line, which is currently under construction

== Surface transport ==
Surface transport in Bucharest is run by Bucharest-Ilfov Intercommunity Development Association for Public Transport (TPBI) and it is operated by Societatea de Transport București (STB), Societatea de Transport Voluntari (STV), a.o..

TPBI consists of a network of buses, trolleybuses, trams and light rail. The TPBI network is one of the densest in Europe, and the fourth largest on the continent, carrying about 1.7 million passengers daily on 85 bus lines, 23 tram lines, 2 light rail lines and 15 trolleybus lines. At times, however, it suffers from severe overcrowding.

Network map of public transport in Bucharest region

=== Buses ===
With a total route length of 1,374 km (854 mi), the TPBI urban bus network is the densest of all the transport types in Bucharest. There are 85 bus lines (plus 25 night routes) operating mostly in the municipality of Bucharest, as well as over 39 bus lines serving commuters from surrounding towns and villages in Ilfov County. In mid-2005, the lines that linked the city to the peripheral area were licensed out to independent transportation providers, but in early 2006, they were returned to STB control due to a wide range customer complaints about the private operators. Sometime in 2010, all the STB lines of the peripheral network were removed, leading to an increase in minivans owned by private transport companies, and so far only a few of these lines have been put back.

In 2017 was founded Bucharest-Ilfov Intercommunity Development Association for Public Transport, and with that STV took over most of the peripheral bus routes.

==== Fleet ====
The main public transport operator in Bucharest ( STB ) has a bus fleet made up of 1,143 vehicles (2018), which are all wheelchair-accessible (low floor) and around 55% are air-conditioned. The fleet utilisation rate during workdays stood at 78.1% in 2018.

Between 2005 and 2009, the fleet underwent its most substantial renewal since 1989, and is now among the most modern in Europe. In December 2005, STB signed a contract for 500 Mercedes Citaro low-floor, wheelchair-accessible buses. The buses were delivered between June 2006 and April 2007. In January 2008, the first of a further series of 500 Citaro low-floor buses were put into service.

The fleet makeup, as of 2019, is as follows, with years of delivery shown in brackets:

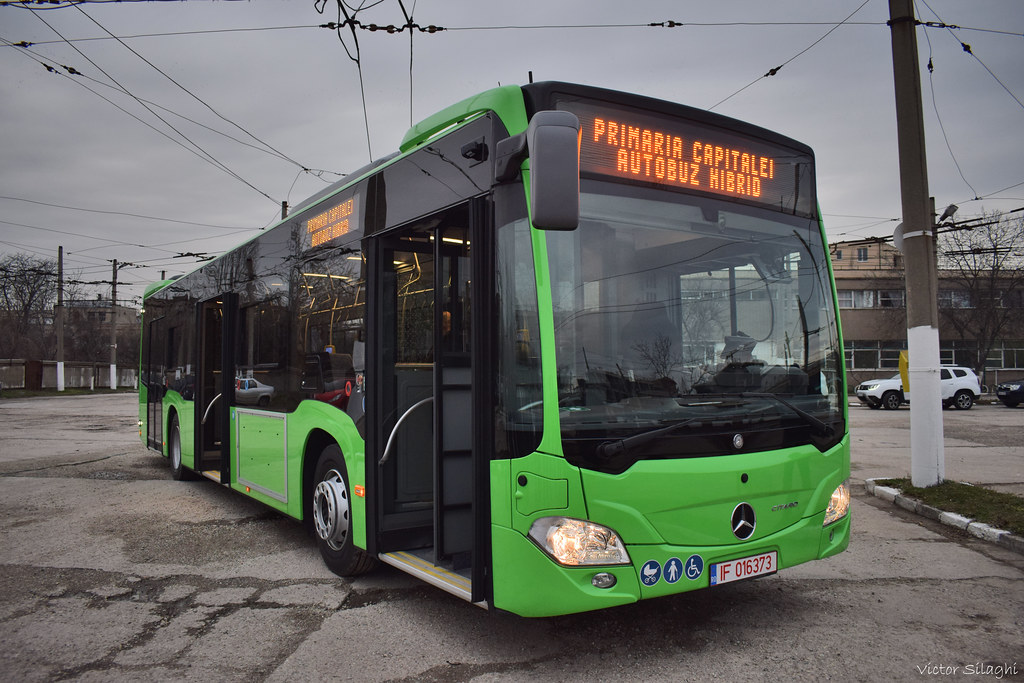
Mercedes Citaro Hybrid Bus (2020–present)
air-conditioned
130 vehicles

Otokar Kent (2018–2019)
air-conditioned
400 vehicles

Mercedes Citaro Facelift (2008–2009)
air-conditioned
500 vehicles

Central Lines are usually populated by Electric and Hybrid buses, while lines connecting residential areas tend to use the Otokar and Mercedes Citaro buses.

=== Trolleybuses ===
Trolleybuses supplement buses on the TPBI system network, which operates 15 trolleybus lines (mainly on high-usage routes), measuring 164.1 km (102.0 mi) of routes on 73.2 km (45.5 mi) network. During the 1990s, the fleet was updated with modern trolleybuses manufactured by Ikarus, in light blue and yellow livery, which have acoustic station announcements and digital display screens.

In early 2007, 100 wheelchair-accessible Irisbus Citelis trolleybuses were introduced on routes 61, 62, 69, 70, 86, 90, 91, and 92.

Two distinct, non-interconnected networks exist in Bucharest, the main network (comprising the two main east–west lines as well as a spur in the northern part of town) and a relatively small southern network in Berceni. Each of the networks has its own, separate trolleybus depots (including separate fleets) and is not connected to the other in any way, in 1987 being separated after the opening of M2 metro line. The trolleybus network is currently being overhauled or expanded — a goal is to eventually unite the two networks.

The newer fleet of Solaris Trollino 12 trolleybuses is used to convert diesel bus routes to trolleybus routes (Eg.: Bus route 133 became part of Trolleybus route 97).

==== Fleet ====
In 2022, the STB had a fleet of 265 trolleybuses spread across 3 depots and 1 mixed tram-trolleybus depot. Most of them were Astra-Ikarus 415T (163 trolleybuses). The fleet utilisation rate during workdays stood at 67.66% in 2022. In 2024, the STB started receiving 100 Solaris Trollino 12 trolleybuses.

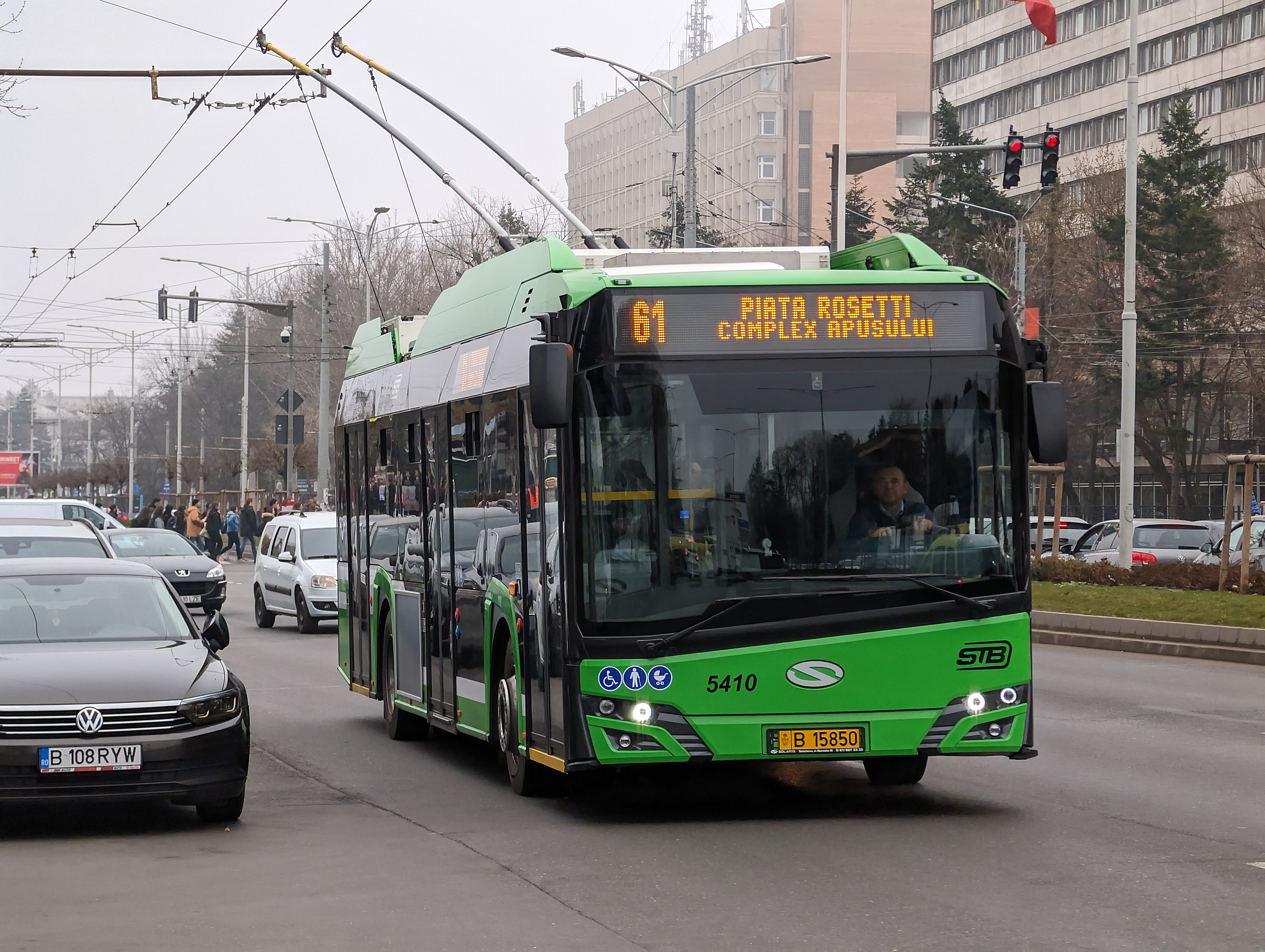
Solaris Trollino 12M on route 61
air-conditioned
100 vehicles being delivered

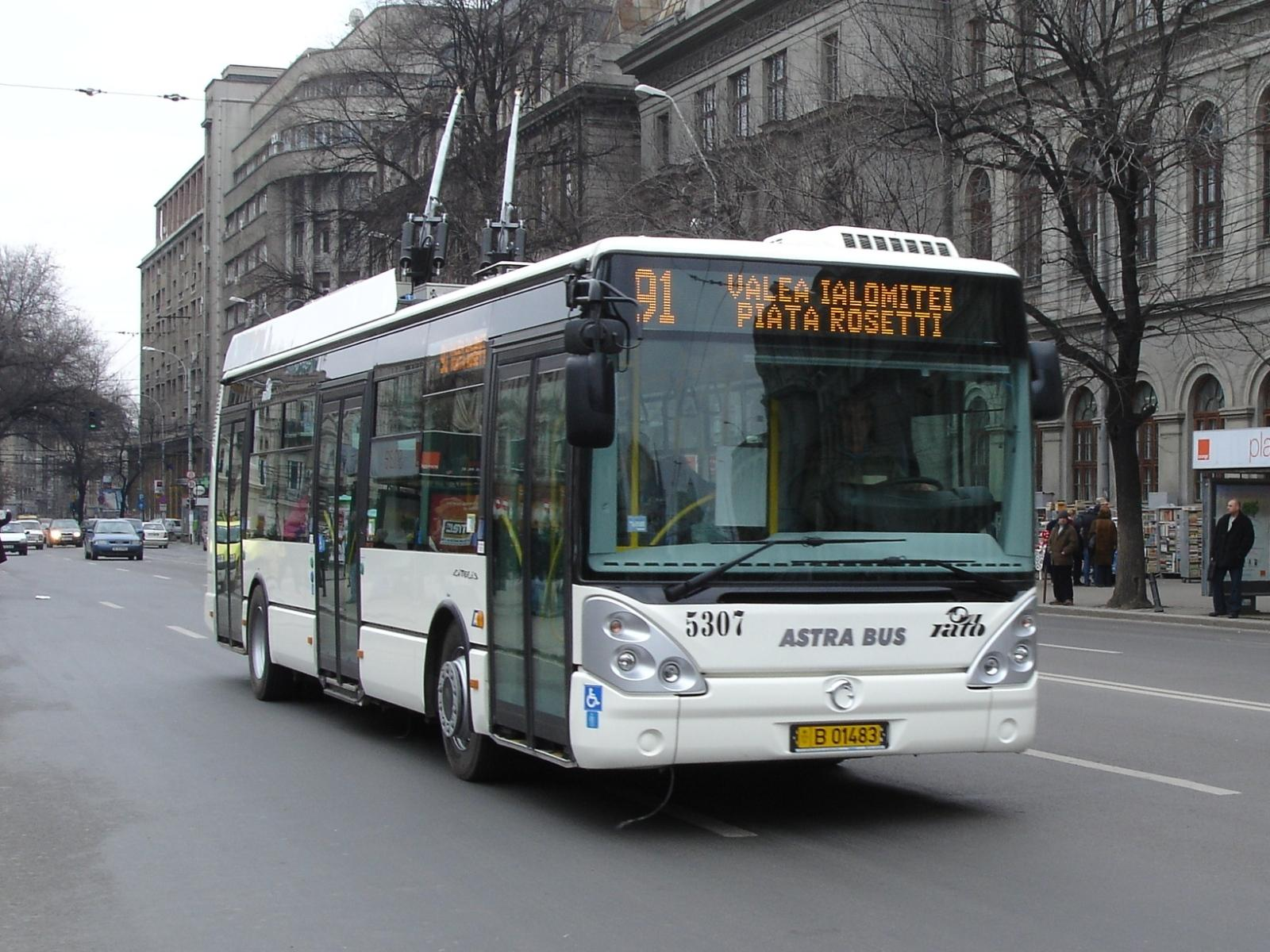
Astra Citelis
trolleybus on Route 91
100 vehicles

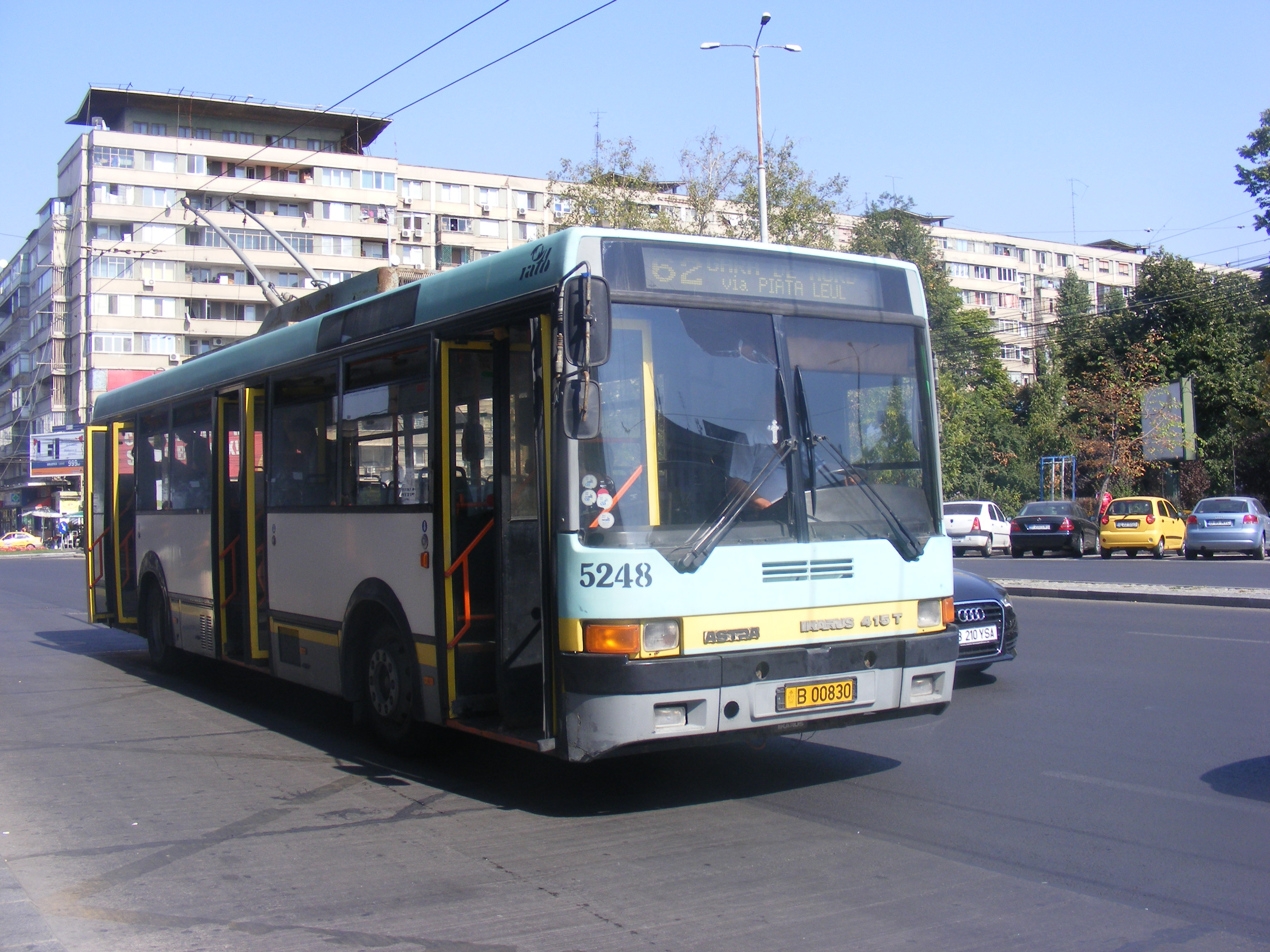
Ikarus 415T
trolleybus on Route 62
163 vehicles

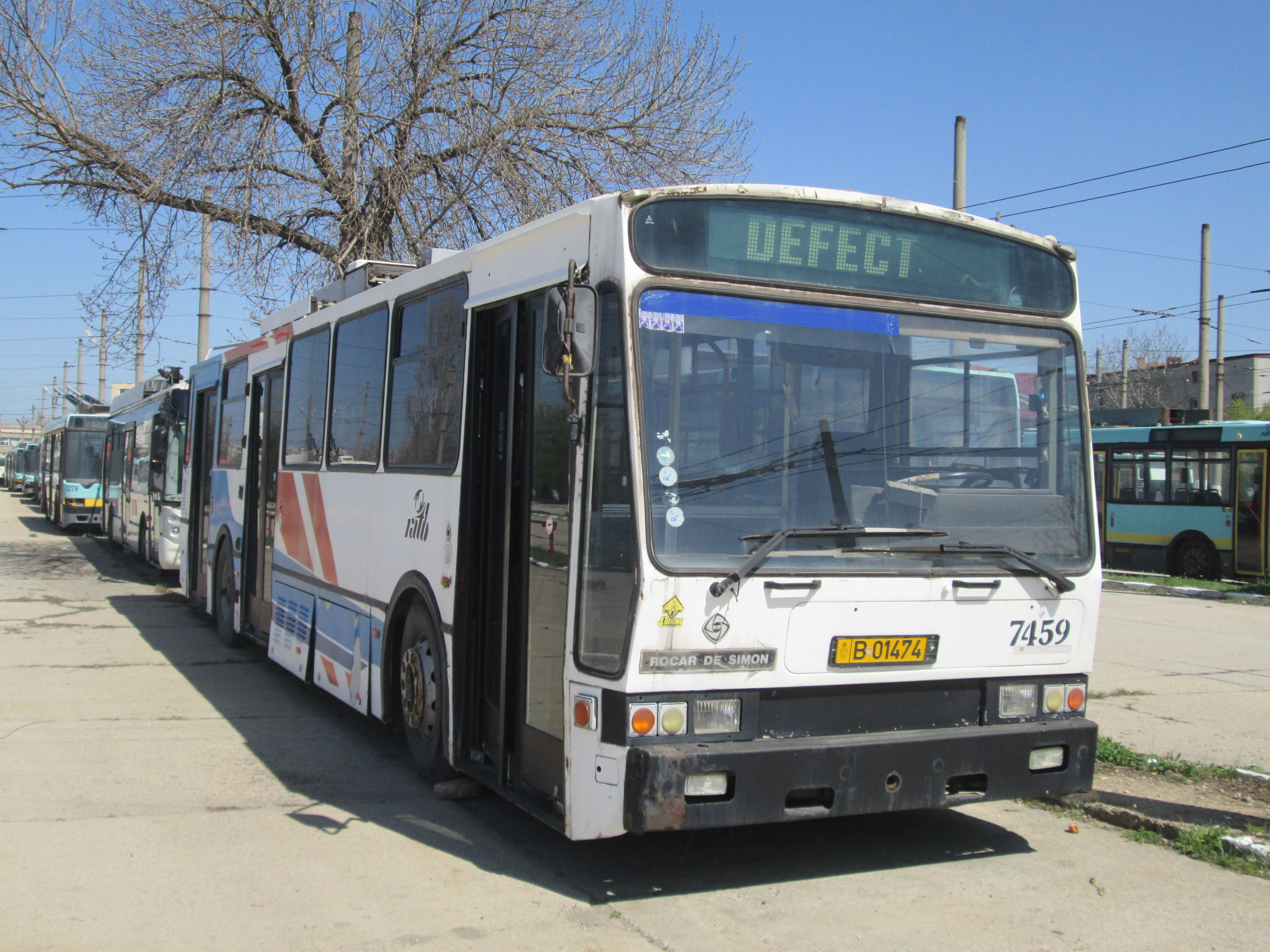
Rocar 412E. Only one exists these days, with AC motors. Stored due to faulty equipment.

=== Trams and light rail ===
STB operates a complex system of trams measuring 332.2 km (206.4 mi) of routes on 143.9 km (89.4 mi) of lines throughout Bucharest. In addition to 23 tram lines, there are two converted light rail lines called metrou uşor ("light metro"), numbered 41, which serve the western and south-western parts of Bucharest. This line has upgraded trams running on separate designated corridors for faster travel times.

67% of the city's tram infrastructure had been modernised by 2018. The light rail service is expected to be expanded by upgrading existing tram lines to light rail status.

Most trams operated by STB (all V3A, Bucur 1 and Bucur LF models) are manufactured internally by STB at their subsidiary URAC Bucharest (the same subsidiary also handles tramway repairs and is in charge of scrapping vehicles reaching the end of their useful life). Currently, URAC produces three models for STB – two three-section, partially low-floor, wheelchair-accessible models (V3A-CH-PPC/CA-PPC derived from the earlier V3A-93 model and the all-new Bucur-LF model) as well as a two-section, non-wheelchair-accessible model (Bucur 1), made from scrapped Tatra axles with new equipment. It is uncertain if their production will continue, because as of now their production has been halted for the past 7 years.

Routes 1, 7, 10, 11, 21, 25, 32, 41 are wheelchair-accessible, using new Astra Imperio Metropolitan, V3A-93-PPC, V3A-CH-PPC/V3A-CA-PPC or Bucur LF trams. Lines 14, 16/17 (17 is an off-days variant of line 16), 19, 23, 27, 40, 42, 44, 47, 53 and 55 are also wheel chair accessible when V3A-93-PPC (number is limited to 8 vehicles at this moment, 008, 164, 169, 181, 206, 227, 303 and 343 can be seen on these routes occasionally, or CA/CH-PPC are sent on these routes. Other routes (if most) will become wheelchair-accessible as soon as more V3A-PPC will undergo reparations or modernisations, or even buy more new tramsets (is it planned an acquisition of 250 trams, of different lengths).

The maximum speed of trams in Bucharest is 60 kilometres per hour (37 mph).

==== Fleet ====
In 2018, the STB had a fleet of 486 trams, most of which were the V3A-M type (323 trams). The fleet is spread across 7 tram depots and 1 mixed tram-trolleybus depot. The fleet utilisation rate during workdays stood at 55.6% in 2018. In December 2022, the first 15 Astra Imperio Metropolitan trams (out of a total order of 100 units) were put into circulation.

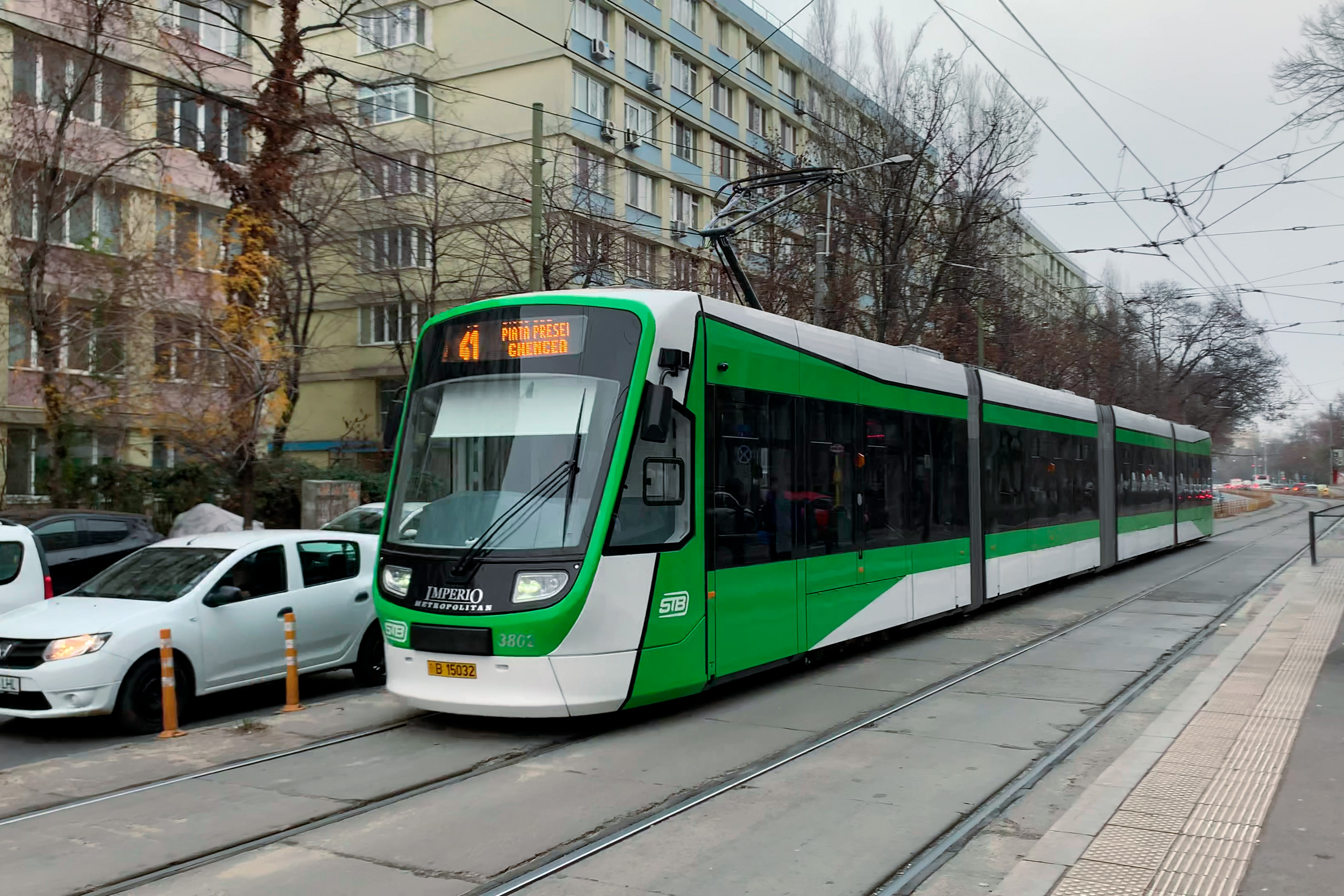
Astra Imperio Metropolitan

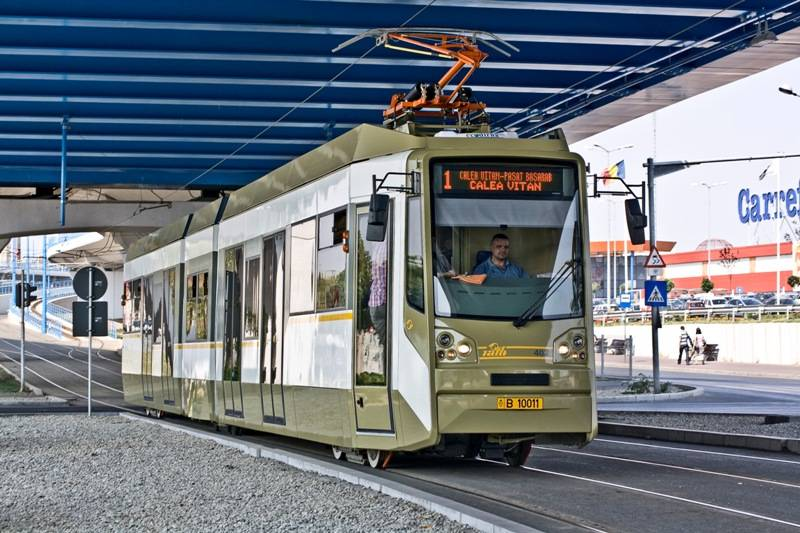
Bucur LF low-floor tram

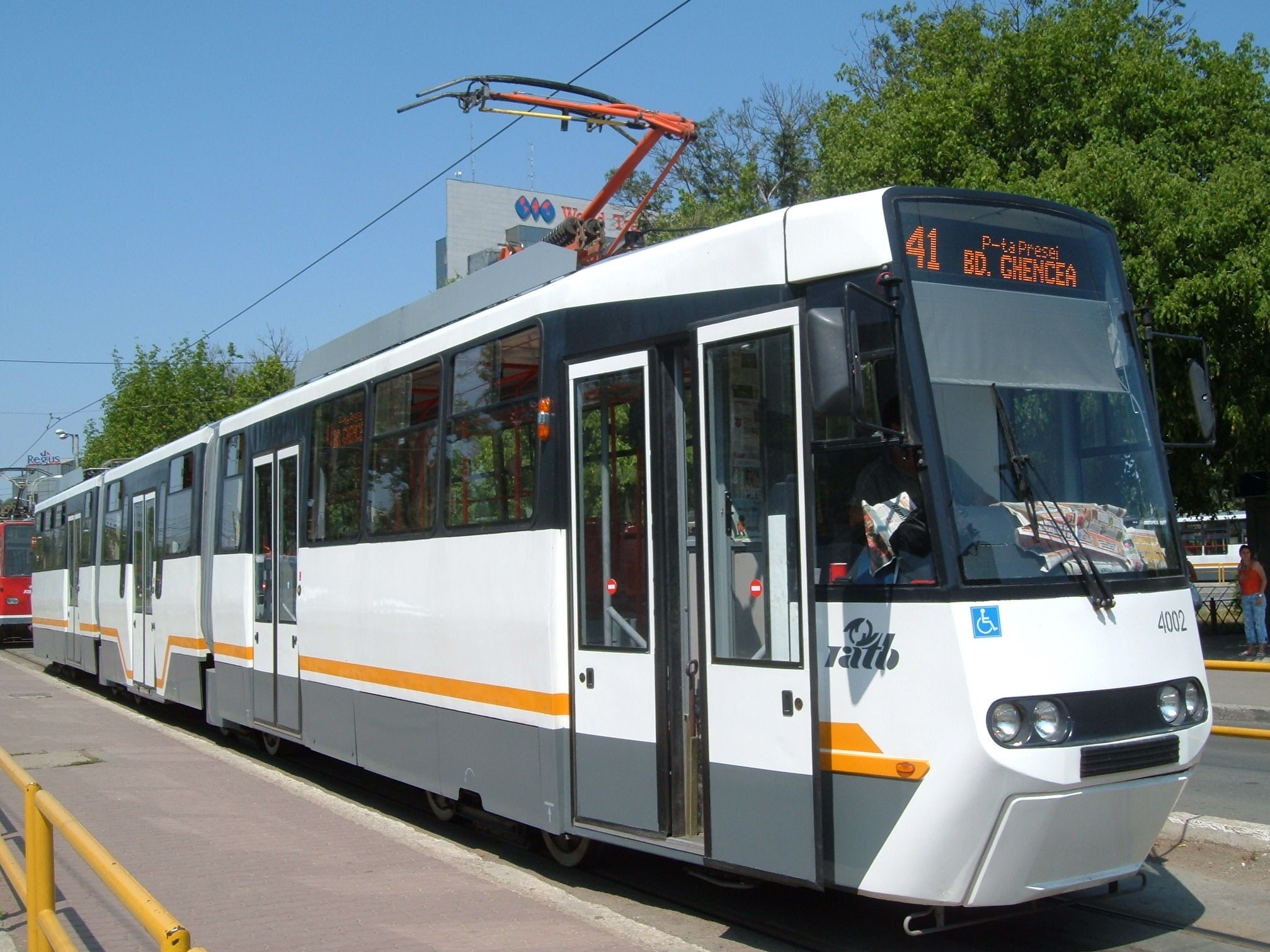
V3A-CH-PPC partial low-floor tram. The other variant is V3A-2010-CA with AC motors.

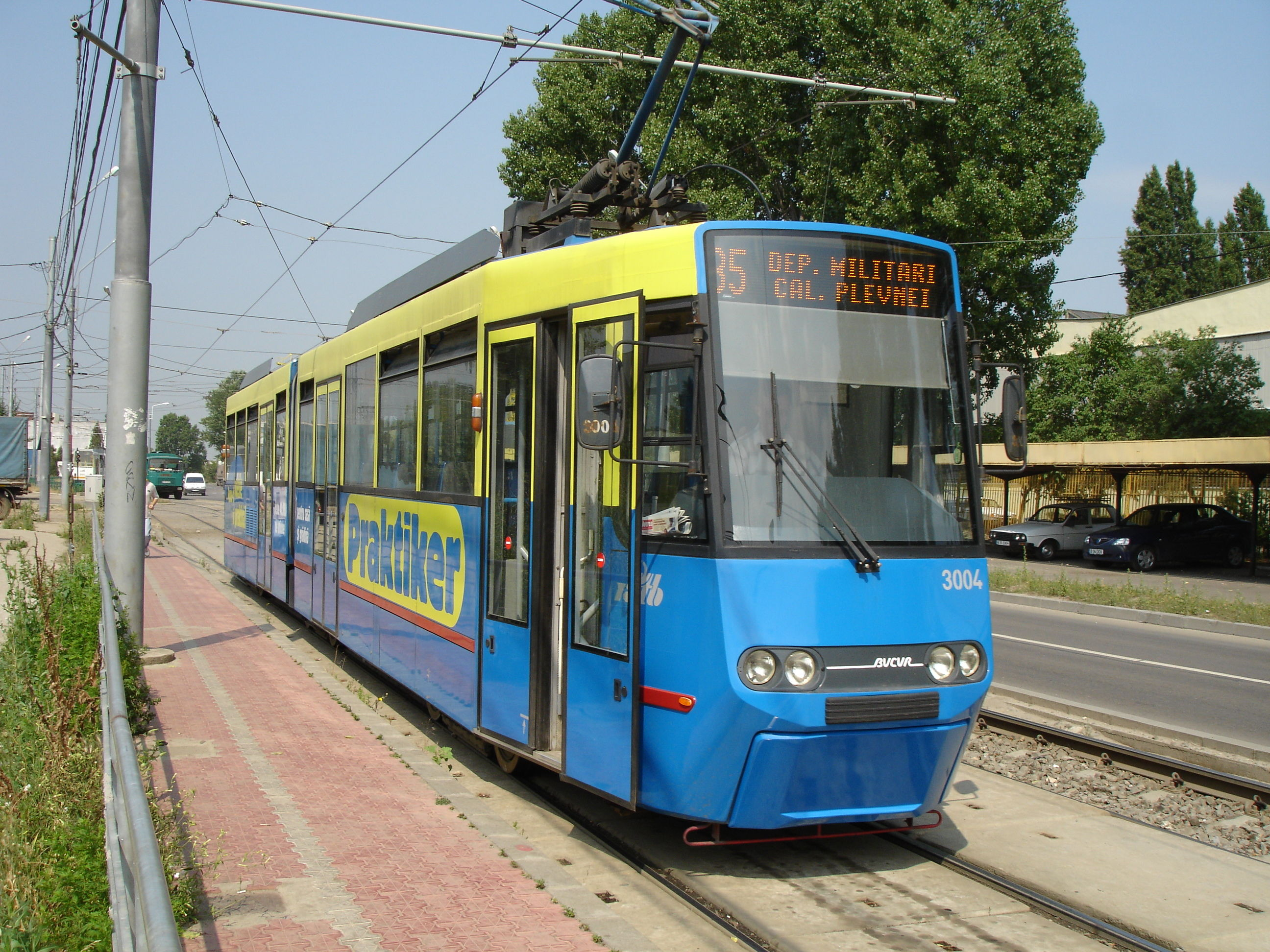
Bucur-1/V2A-T tram

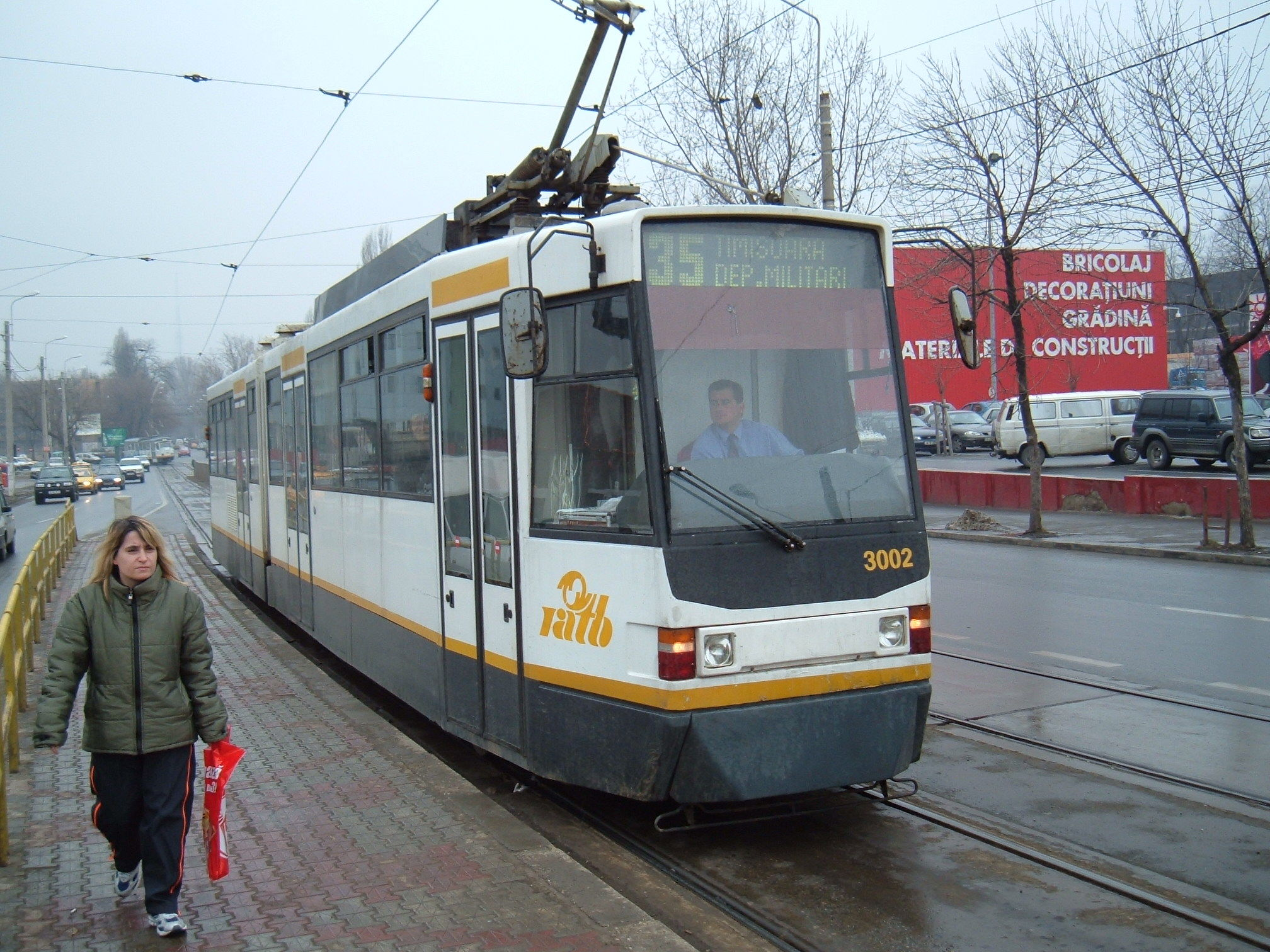
Bucur-1-V2S-T tram
Only 2 exist. Stored in Militari Depot

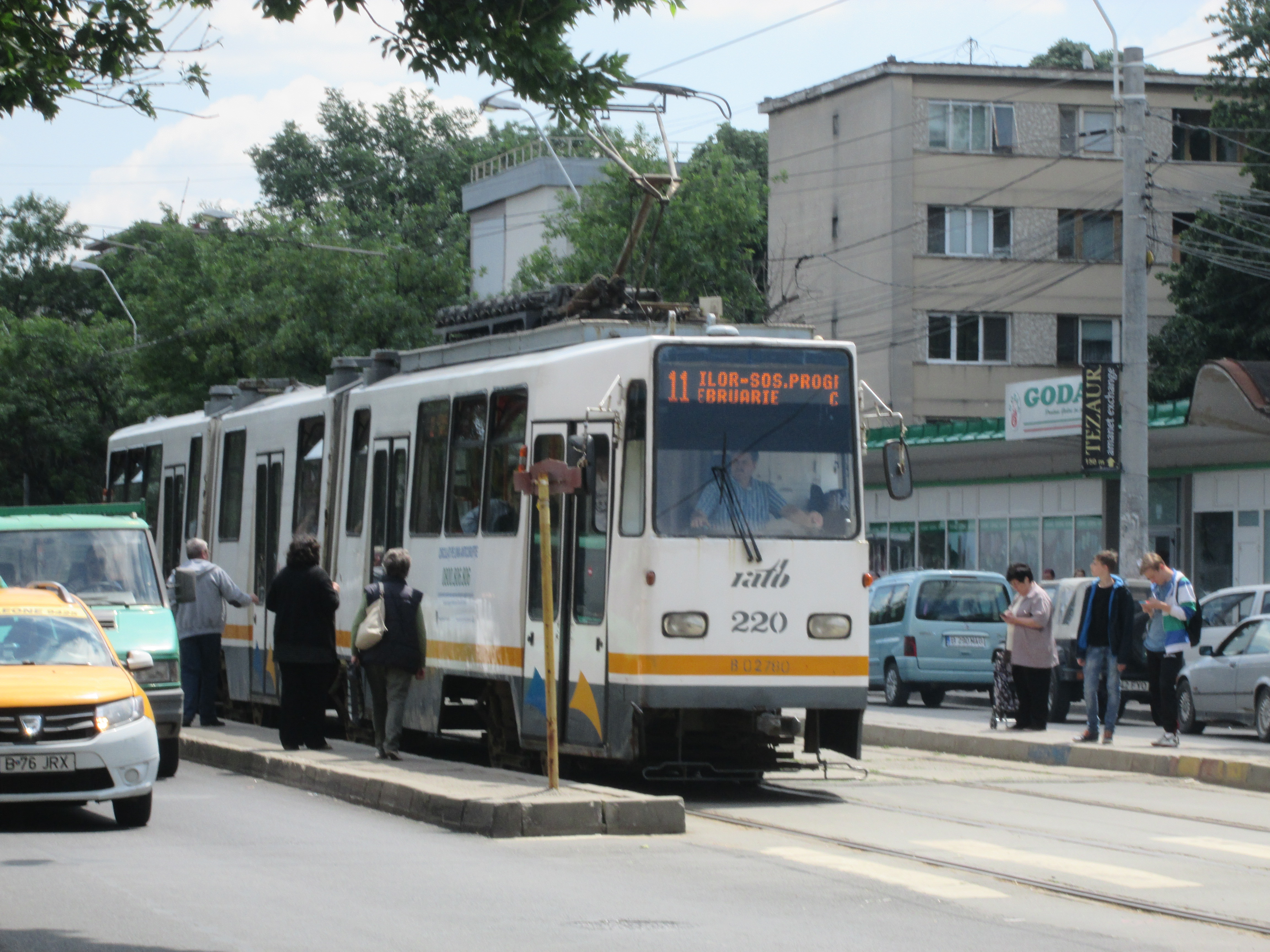
V3A-93

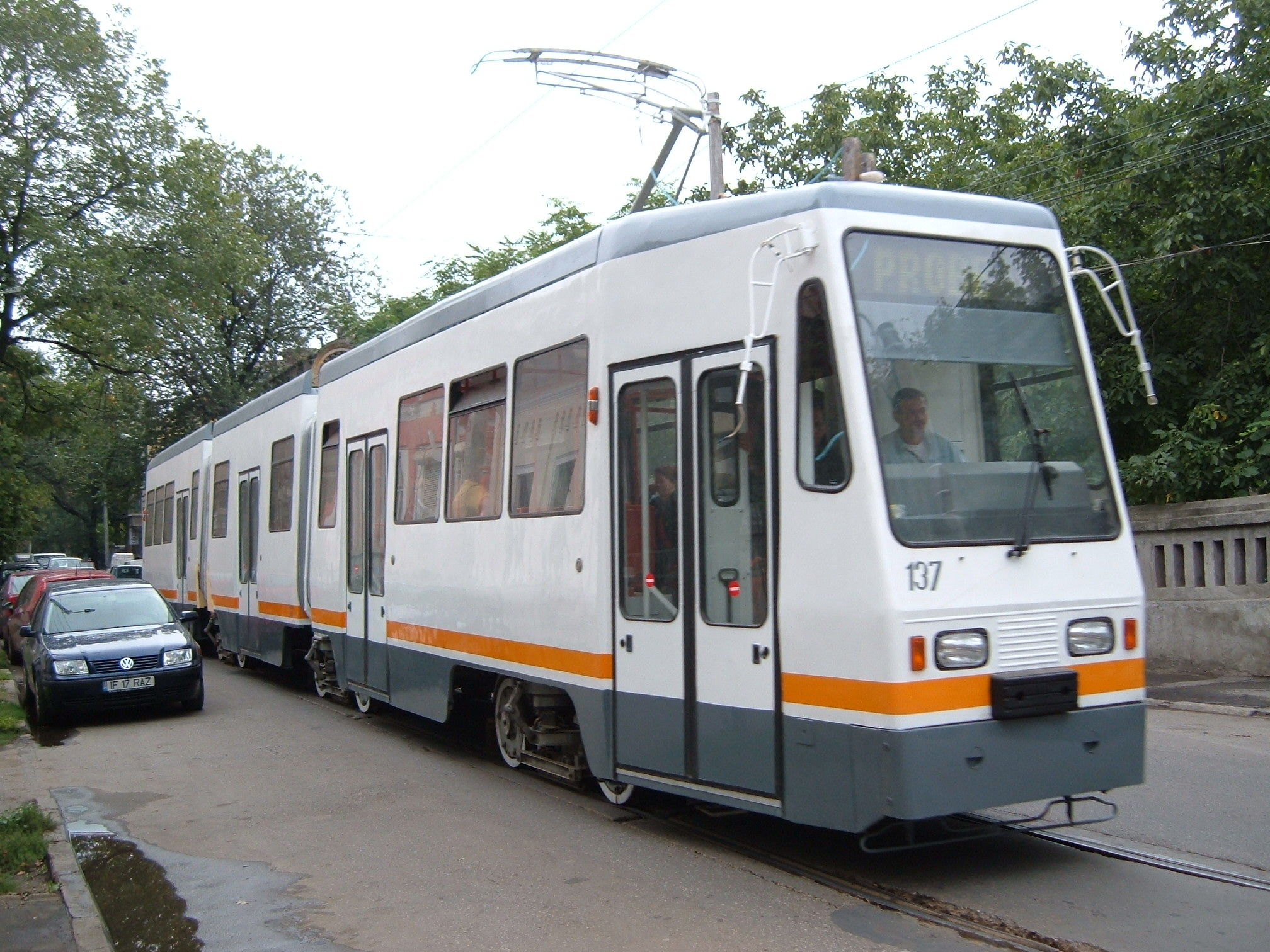
V3A-93M/Electroputere

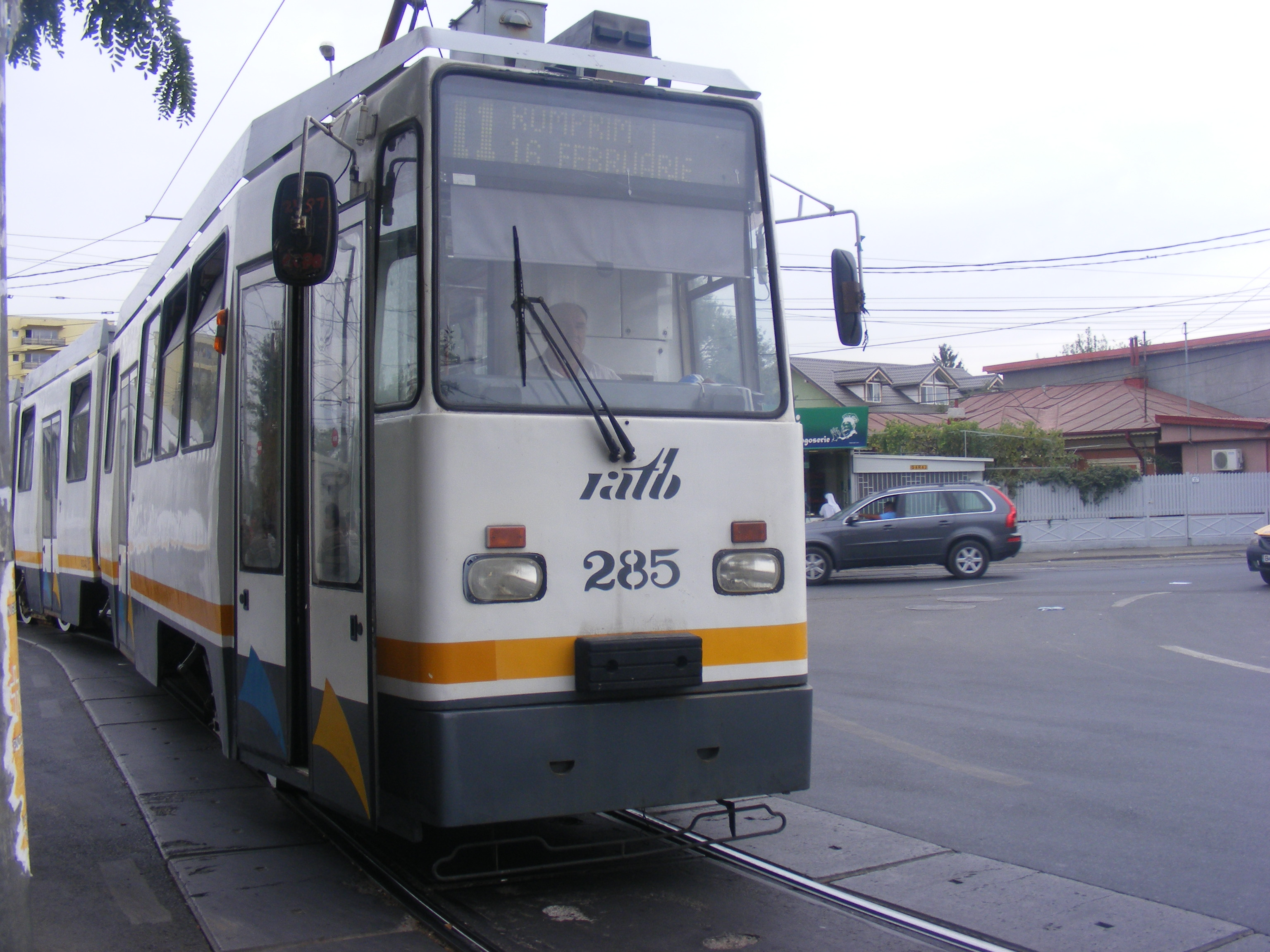
V3A-93M-FAUR

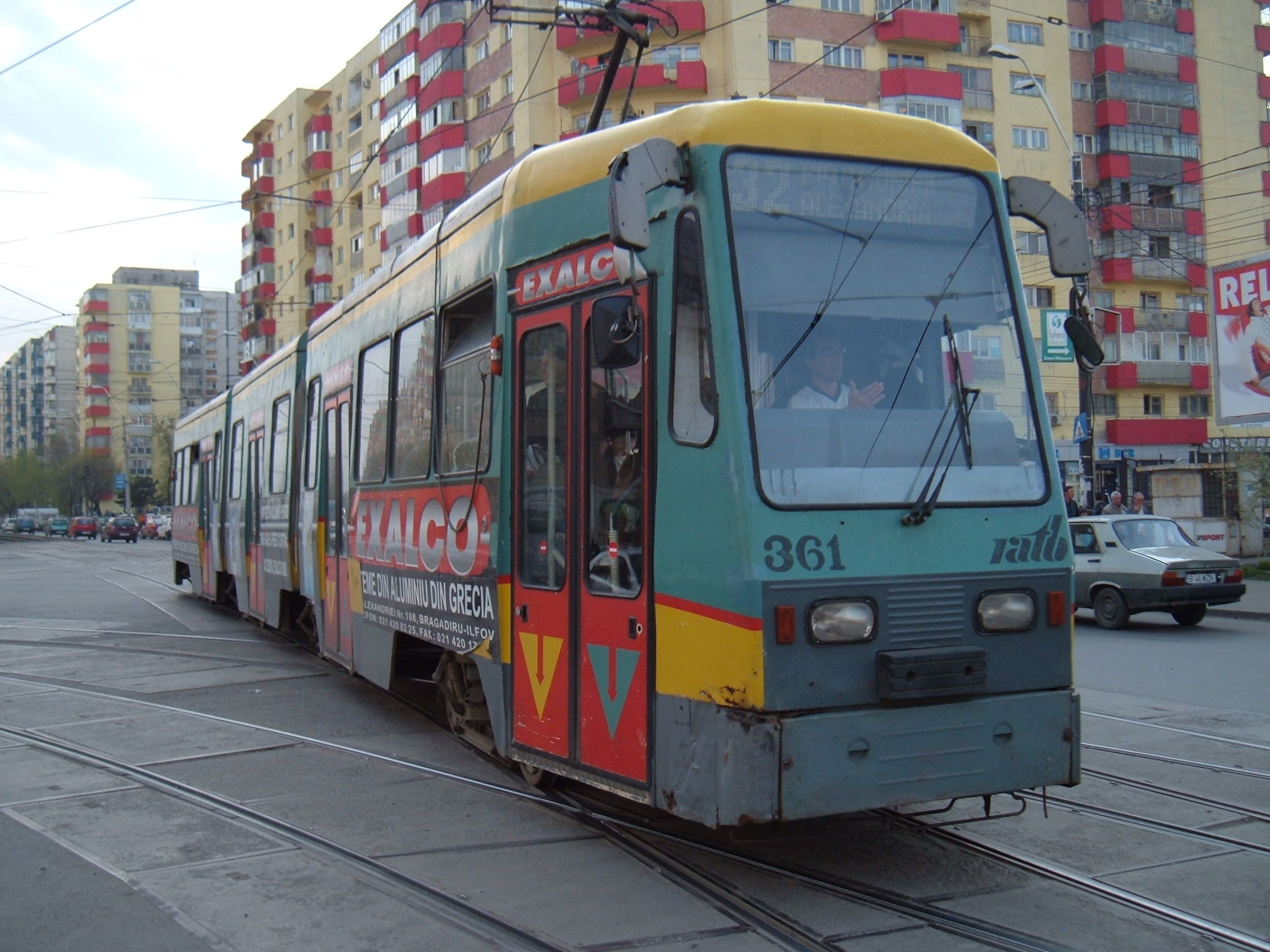
V3A-H tram

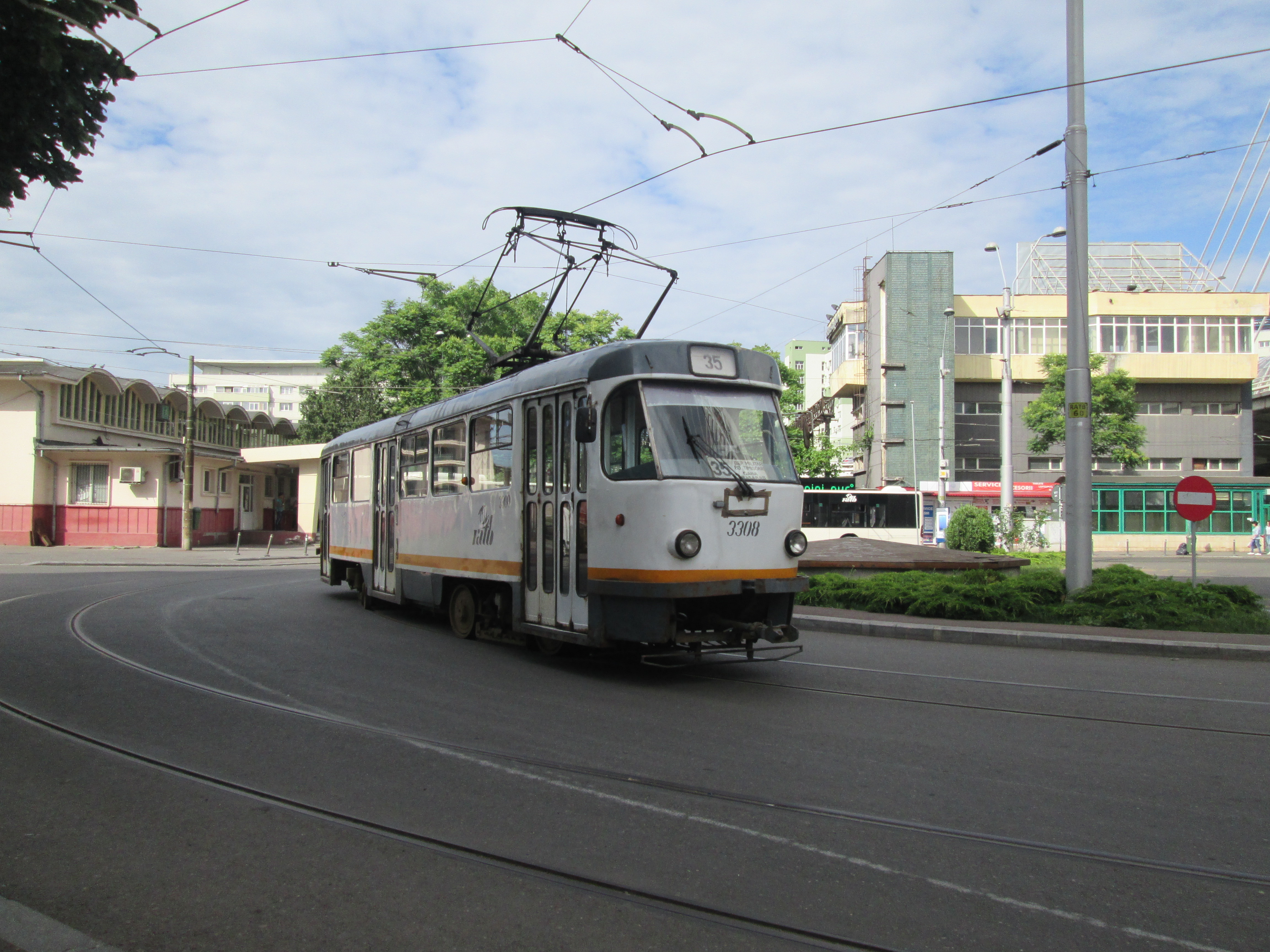
Tatra T4R

== Tickets ==
Surface transportation, operated by STB uses a different ticketing system from the metro network, operated by Metrorex, a separate entity. Their tickets and prices can be found on their website, available in English as well. http://www.stb.ro/

They include subscriptions, rechargeable cards as well as single use cards. A simple metropolitan ticket valid on all surface lines for 90 minutes costs 3 RON and can be activated by tapping either a STB transit card or a contactless bank card on the ticket machines present inside all vehicles. Tickets can also be bought through SMS by sending a message to 7458, with the message "C", you will be charged 0.65 EUR + VAT. You can also purchase a 24-hour pass for 8 RON at any kiosk or by sending the message "AB" to the same number, costing you 1.5 EUR + VAT.

This method of SMS-based payment is also available through the app, InfoTB. The app can also plan routes using all types of transportation in the city, and show the GPS location of vehicles. Approximately 85% of vehicles are equipped with a GPS positioning system.

A separate app, 24Pay, can be used to pay for fares using a credit card.

An online account can also be created on the website, that allows clients to add credit to their STB cards.

BCR (Romanian Commercial Bank) ATMs also allow clients to recharge their physical cards with money.

Metrorex and STB have integrated tickets and passes, information which is available on their websites, but also on the Bucharest Metro page. An integrated fare costs 5 RON and can be used simultaneously on both surface lines and the metro, with a time limit of 120 minutes.

The Bucharest Metro uses a per-entry constant fare system, regardless of stations travelled, time spent or zones used, changing lines doesn't require additional pay and is free, the only exception is Gara De Nord, where the 2 corresponding stations are separate and thus you are required to exit the system and pay again at the other station to transfer lines, though free transfers from the M1 to the M4 can be done at the neighbouring Basarb station.

Passengers can purchase paper tickets loaded with 1, 2 or 10 fares or simply tap their contactless bank cards at the turnstiles, which will charge them 3 RON. Rechargeable contactless metro cards can also be issued and loaded with passes available for either a day, a week, a month or a year. The most commonly used pass is the 1 month pass priced at 80 RON.

=== Personal cars ===
At the end of 2008, in Bucharest there were 1.24 million vehicles, of which 985.000 were personal cars. In 2007 there were 150.000 fewer vehicles, which means the number of vehicles increased by 13.76% in one year.

With so many cars and a very high population density (50% higher than Tokyo and 4 times bigger than Rome for example), parking is a problem in Bucharest.

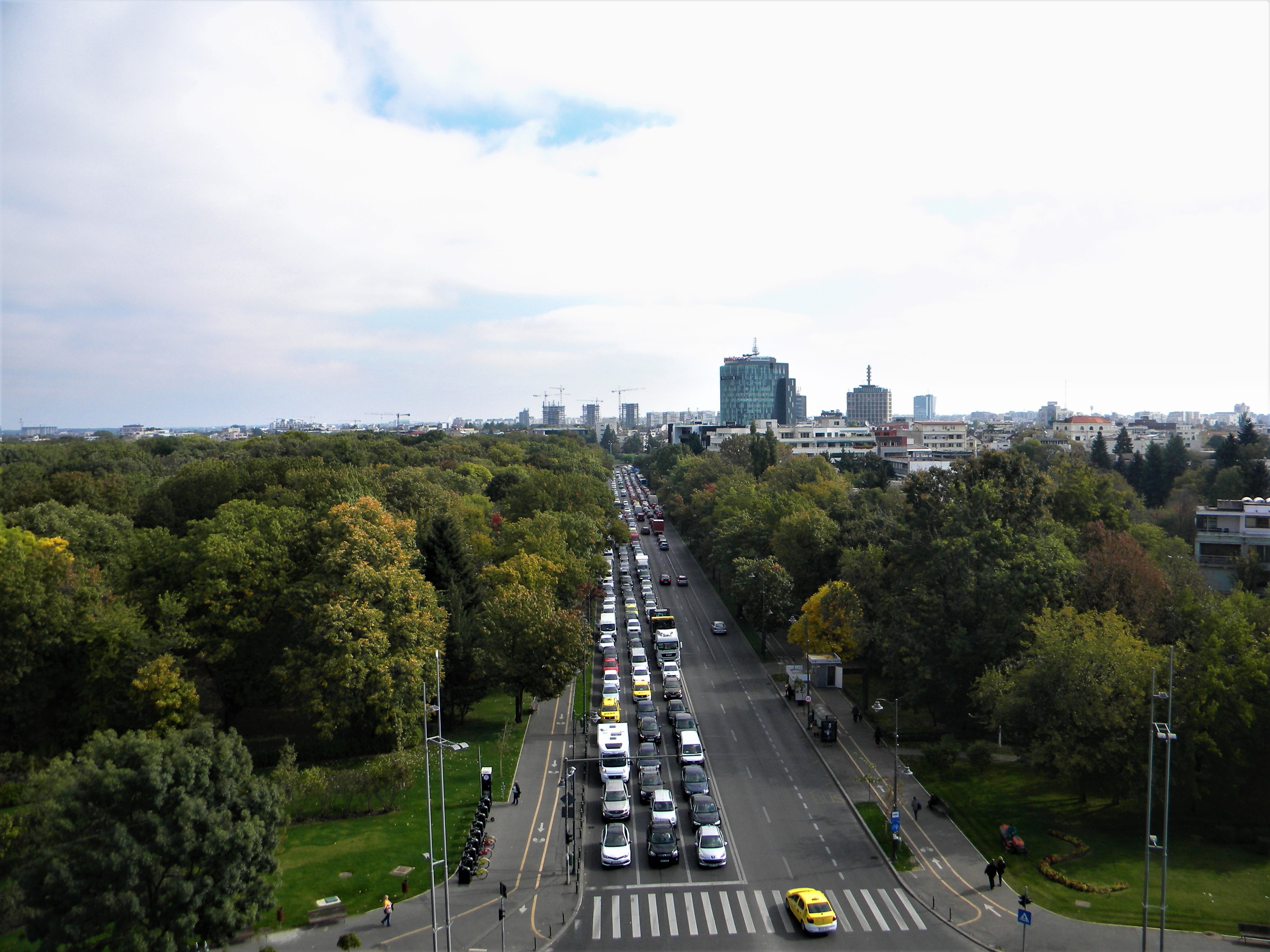

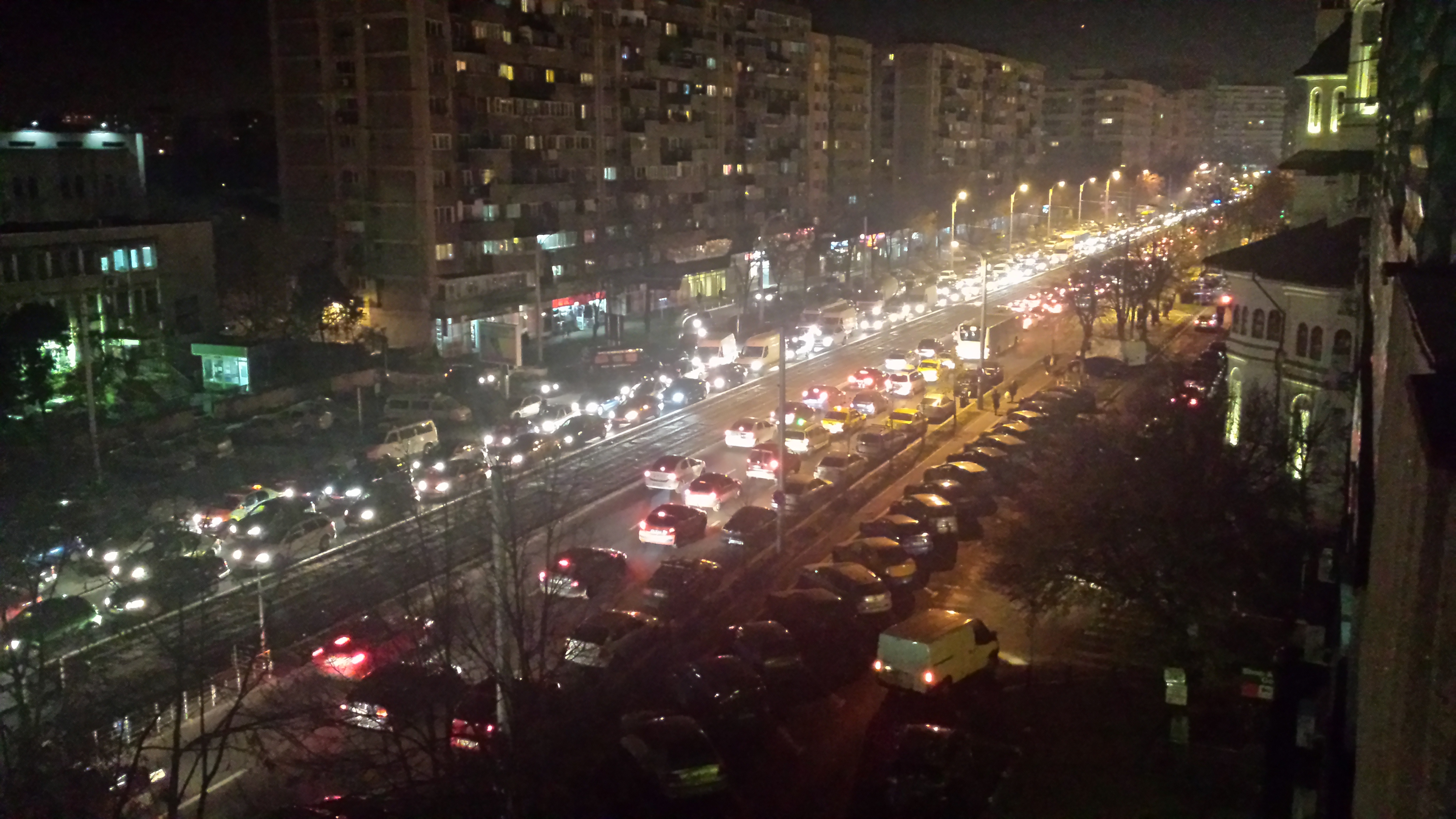

== CFR Trains ==
In 2011, Bucharest had 99 km of railway lines, 79 of which were electric.

Bucharest has several train stations throughout and around the city, the main one being Gara de Nord where trains depart to all destinations. Other main stations include Baneasa, Obor and Basarab.

Gara de Nord is a relatively modern station. It was opened in 1872 and has undergone modernization and refurbishment several times. From here, trains leave to every destination in Romania and to other European cities. The other stations only see around five trains a day and are not considered "important" stations by CFR.

Bucharest was once home to a vast system of industrial railways that sprawled all over the city, linking factories to the surrounding neighbourhoods and towns. However most of these are now gone and what remains has fallen into disrepair. Therefore, Bucharest doesn't have an RER/S-Bahn type of commuter network. Attempts have been made in the past to introduce such a system, but so far not much has been achieved. It is true that there are trains operated by CFR from Bucharest to neighbouring towns, however due to long journey times and poor rolling stock most people tend to use personal cars to get into the city.

== Road network ==
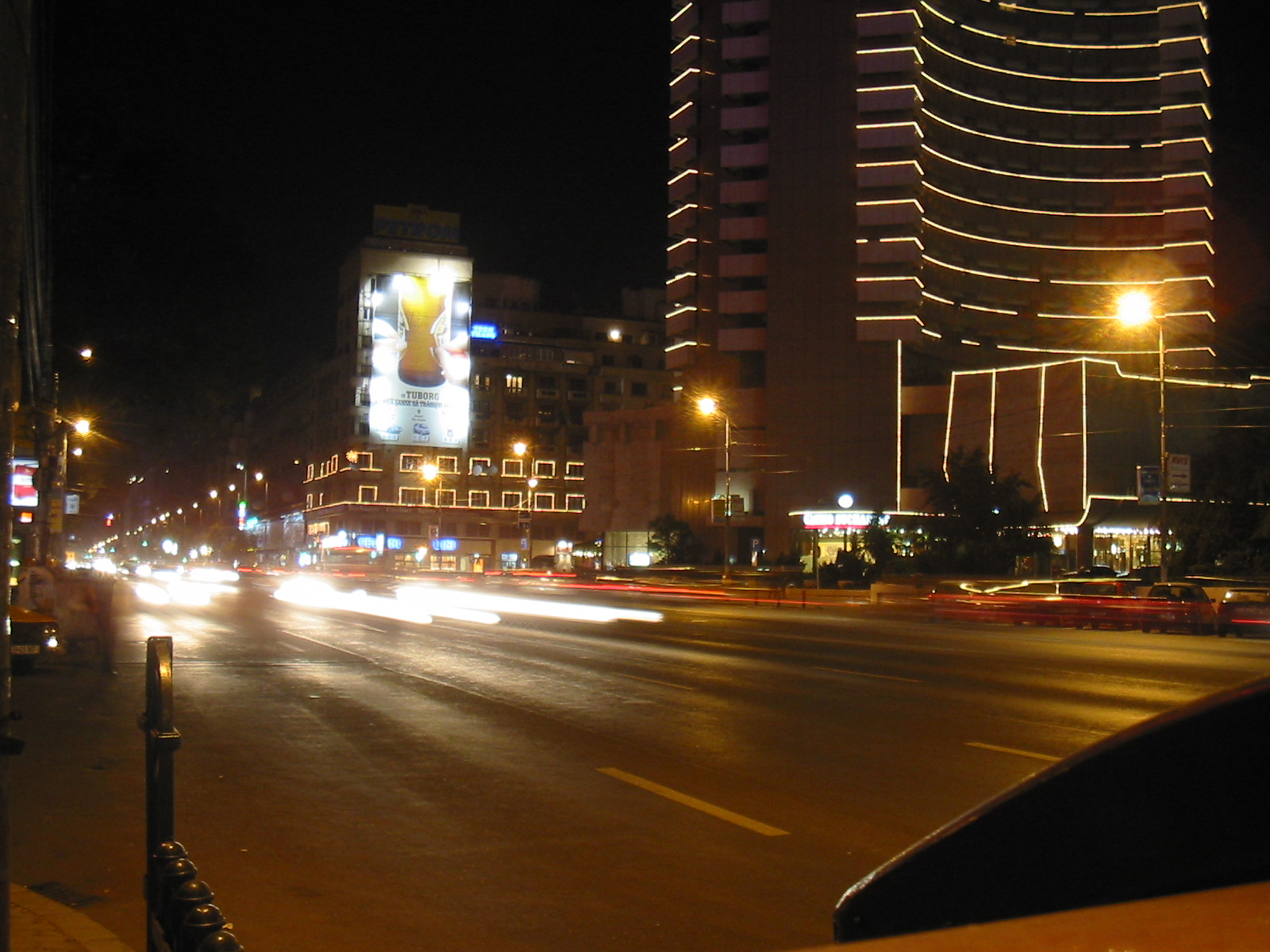
Magheru Boulevard at night

The city's municipal road network is centred on a series of high-capacity boulevards (6 to 10 lanes), which generally radiate out from the city centre to the outskirts and are arranged in geographical axes (principally north–south, east–west and northwest–southeast). The principal and thus most congested boulevards are Calea Victoriei, Bulevardul Unirii and Șoseaua Mihai Bravu, which is the longest in Bucharest and forms a sort of semicircle around the northeastern part of the old district. The city also has two ring roads, one internal (Mihai Bravu is part of it) and one external, which are mainly used for cars that bypass the city as well as trucks, which aren't allowed in the city centre, Works on a third ring road (the A0), which would be mainly used for transit and freight traffic around the city, began in 2020 on some segments. Aside from the main roads, the city also has a number of secondary roads, which connect the main boulevards. In the historical city centre, particularly the Lipscani area, many streets are cobbled and are classified as pedestrian zones.

The city's roads are usually very crowded during rush hours, due to an increase in car ownership in recent years. Every day, there are more than one million vehicles travelling within the city limits. This has resulted in wearing of the upper layer of tarmac on many of roads in Bucharest, particularly secondary roads which are now used in an equal amount, this being identified as one of Bucharest's main infrastructural problems. The pothole problem is notorious enough to have inspired a song by the band Taxi with a chorus "Cratere ca-n București, nici pe luna nu gaseşti!" ("Craters like in Bucharest you won't even find on the moon"). However, in recent years, there has been a comprehensive effort on behalf of the City Hall to boost improvement of road infrastructure, mainly by resurfacing and widening roads, and repairing footpaths. Faulty urban planning will likely lead to an increase in traffic and parking problems, since new housing areas are built with houses and apartment buildings literally squeezed into existing small grid roads, a problem commonly identified in the "suburbs" of the city.

Bucharest is one of the principal junctions of Romania's national road network, which links the city to all of Romania's major cities as well as to neighbouring countries such as Hungary, Bulgaria and Ukraine. Furthermore, the city is the starting point of the A1 motorway, towards Pitești, the A2, linking the capital with the country's ports and seaside resorts on the Black Sea and the A3, towards Ploiești.

== Airports ==
Bucharest has two international airport:

- Henri Coandă International Airport, located north of the Bucharest metropolitan area, in the town of Otopeni, Ilfov. Currently the airport has one terminal divided into three inter-connected buildings (International Departures Hall, International Arrivals Hall and the Domestic Flights Hall – at the ground level of the Arrivals Hall). The International Departures Hall consists of 36 check-in desks, one finger with 10 gates (5 equipped with jetways), while the Domestic Hall has an extra four gates. Today's International Arrivals Hall is the old Otopeni terminal, while the new Departures Hall, including the finger and the airbridges was built and inaugurated in 1997. A second finger with 7 jetways is under construction and a new building terminal on the east side is in project phase. The airport received 8,317,168 passengers in 2015. It is accessible by STB buses 100 and the future M6 underground line, which will link the airport with the main train station of Bucharest.
- Aurel Vlaicu International Airport is situated only 8 km north of the Bucharest city centre and is accessible by STB buses 100, 131, 330, 335, tram line 5 (temporarily closed, replaced by 605) and taxi.

== Water transport ==
Although it is situated on the banks of a river, Bucharest has never functioned as a port city, with other Romanian cities such as Constanţa and Brăila acting as the country's main ports. However, the Danube-Bucharest Canal, which is 73 km long, was under construction until 1990 and is not being worked on as of 2015. When eventually finished, the canal will link Bucharest to the Danube River and, via the Danube-Black Sea Canal, to the Black Sea. This transport corridor is expected to be a significant component of the city's transport infrastructure and increase sea traffic by a large margin.
