= TPBI =

Asociația de Dezvoltare Intercomunitară pentru Transport Public București – Ilfov (TPBI)

Overview
- Owner: Municipality of Bucharest
- Area served: Bucharest and Ilfov County
- Transit type: Bus; Trolleybus; Light rail Tram
- Chief executive: Nicușor Dan (President)
- Headquarters: Bucharest, 5th Sector, Bd. Tudor Vladimirescu, No. 22
- Website: tpbi.ro

Operation
- Began operation: 2017

Bucharest has the largest public transportation network in Romania and one of the largest in Europe.

TPBI (Bucharest-Ilfov Intercommunity Development Association for Public Transport) was established as a cooperative structure of the local public authorities in the region, being founded on 20 October 2017. The association has its own legal personality and public utility status recognized by law, intended to jointly exercise the competencies of local public administration authorities related to the provision of public transport services.

== Purpose of TPBI ==
The Association's objectives are:

- The establishment, organization, regulation, operation, monitoring, and joint management of the local public transport services within the association's member Local Administrative Units;
- Improving integrated mobility by coordinating and appropriately financing public transport services;
- Strategic planning, monitoring, and approval of activities related to the authorization, organization, management, and oversight of public passenger transport services in the Bucharest-Ilfov region for buses, trolleybuses, trams, and other means of public passenger transport;
- Executing the measures and investment projects outlined in the Bucharest-Ilfov Sustainable Urban Mobility Plan 2016–2030, approved by all local public authorities in the Bucharest-Ilfov region;
- Implementing Regulation (EC) No. 1370/2007 of the European Parliament and Council, dated October 23, 2007, on public rail and road passenger transport services—mandatory for all member states as of December 2009—through concluding public service contracts or service management delegation agreements with public passenger transport operators.

== Public transport operators ==
Currently, in the Bucharest-Ilfov Region, there are four public transport operators that have signed service management delegation contracts with TPBI:

- Societatea de Transport București – STB SA (Bucharest Transport Company)
- Serviciul de Transport Voluntari – STV SA (Voluntari Transport Service)
- Ecotrans STCM SRL
- Regio Serv Transport SRL
