= Gorjului metro station =

Bucharest metro station

Coordinates: 44.43427°N 26.02088°E

Gorjului
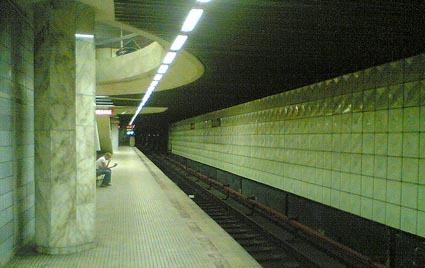
- Metro station in 2006

General information
- Location: Dezrobirii & Iuliu Maniu Avenues, Militari, Sector 6, Bucharest; Romania
- Platforms: One island platform
- Tracks: 2
- Bus routes: 61, 62, 63, 106, 137, 138, 434, 483.

Construction
- Structure type: Underground

History
- Opened: 31 August 1994 (outbound platform); 15 November 1998 (inbound platform)

Services
Preceding station	Bucharest Metro	Following station
Păcii towards Preciziei	Line M3	Lujerului towards Anghel Saligny
Location

Gorjului is a metro station in Bucharest named after the Piaţa Gorjului (Gorjului Market), east of which is situated. The station was opened on 31 August 1994 on already operating extension from Eroilor to Industriilor.

It is an infill station that was added later to the system in the 1990s, and built in two stages. The platform for trains headed for Industriilor was built first and opened in 1994, and after a few years, the platform for trains headed for Eroilor entered revenue service in 1998. As a consequence the two platforms and associated vestibules were built with different materials and different colour schemes were used (the outbound platform features a warm reddish colour scheme, while the inbound platform uses a darker colder materials and colours).
