= 1 Decembrie 1918 metro station =

Bucharest metro station

M3 1 Decembrie 1918
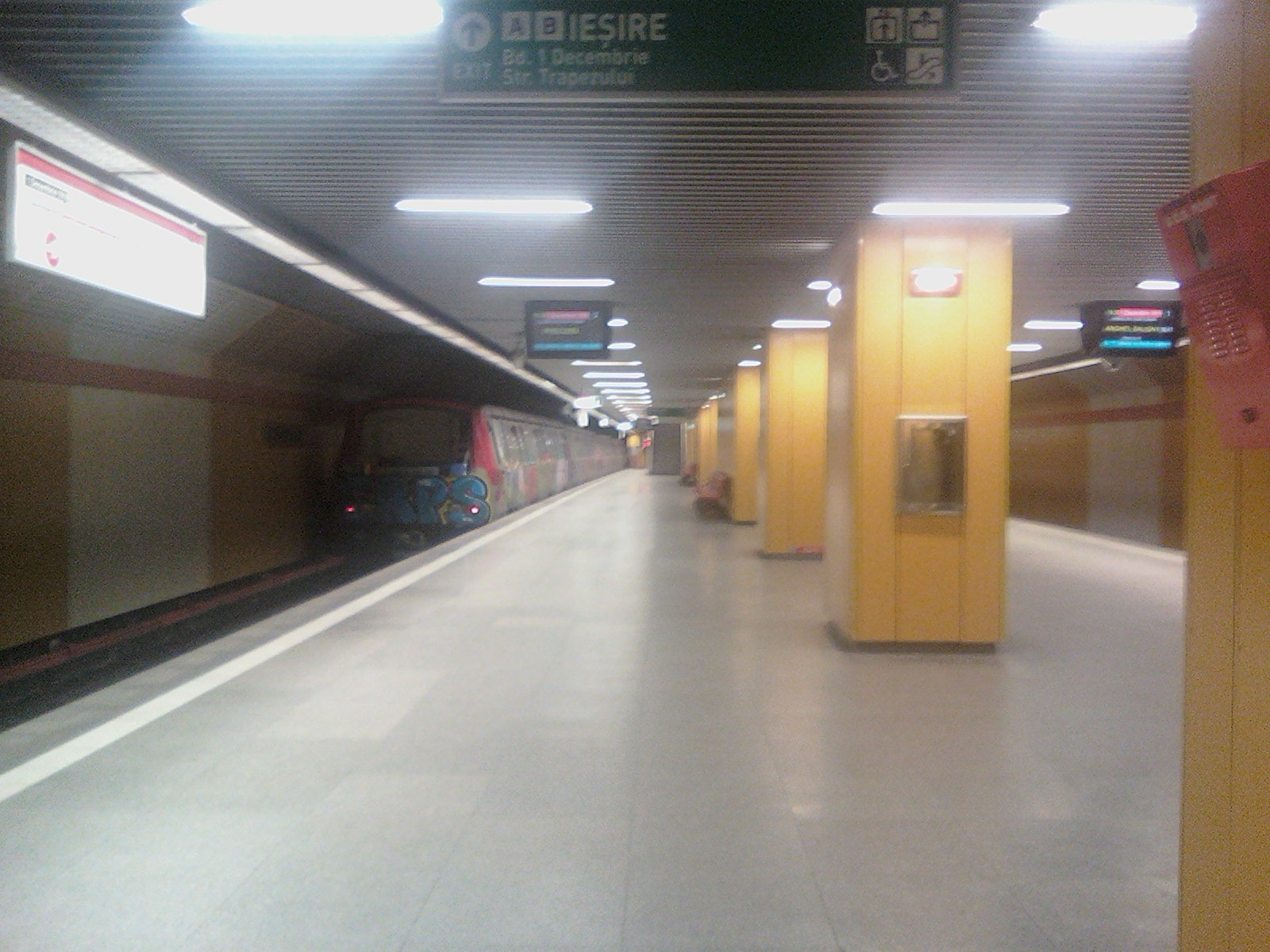

General information
- Location: Theodor Pallady Avenue, 1 Decembrie 1918 Avenue; Sector 3, Bucharest; Romania
- Coordinates: 44°24′38″N 26°10′28″E
- Operated by: Metrorex
- Platforms: 1 island platform
- Tracks: 2
- Tram routes: ~~19*~~, ~~27*~~, ~~40~~
- Bus routes: STB: 619*, 627*, N111

Construction
- Structure type: Underground
- Accessible: Yes

History
- Opened: 20 November 2008

Services
Preceding station	Bucharest Metro	Following station
Nicolae Grigorescu towards Preciziei	Line M3	Nicolae Teclu towards Anghel Saligny
Location

1 Decembrie 1918 is a metro station located in southeastern Bucharest on Line M3. It's named to celebrate 1 December 1918, when the union between Romania and Transylvania occurred – It is a public holiday in Romania.

It is on the Linia de Centură branch of the Bucharest Metro, and was opened on 20 November 2008 as part of the extension from Nicolae Grigorescu to Linia de Centură (now Anghel Saligny). Initially, a shuttle started operating between Nicolae Grigorescu and Anghel Saligny. The regular operation started on 4 July 2009.

== Route ==
It serves the neighbourhoods of southern Titan, 1 Decembrie Ozana and Trapezului. It is one of sixty-three stations that will be equipped with Braille signage panels and tactile stainless-steel elements as part of a European-funded project worth RON 24.12 million.
