= Mihai Bravu metro station =

Bucharest metro station

Coordinates: 44°24′43″N 26°07′38″E

Mihai Bravu
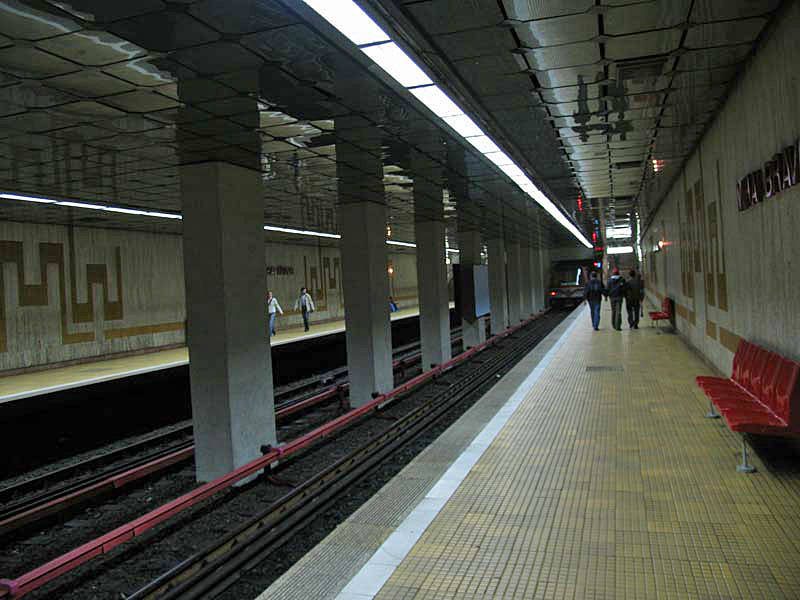
- Metro station in 2005

General information
- Location: Șoseaua Mihai Bravu; Sector 3, Bucharest; Romania
- Platforms: 2 side platforms
- Tracks: 2
- Tram routes: 1, 10.
- Bus routes: 223, 312.

Construction
- Structure type: Underground

History
- Opened: 28 December 1981

Services
Preceding station	Bucharest Metro	Following station
Timpuri Noi towards Dristor 2	Line M1	Dristor 1 towards Republica
Timpuri Noi towards Preciziei	Line M3	Dristor 1 towards Anghel Saligny
Location

Mihai Bravu is a metro station in Bucharest. It is named after the road underneath which it is built. It serves the residential areas of Vitan, northern Tineretului, and Bârzești. The station was opened on 28 December 1981 as part of the second phase of Line 1 between Timpuri Noi and Republica.
