= Titan, Bucharest =

Neighbourhood of Bucharest

Coordinates: 44°25′27.49″N 26°9′39.47″E

Titan on the map of Bucharest

Titan (Romanian pronunciation: [tiˈtan]) is a neighborhood of Eastern Bucharest, part of Sector 3. It surrounds the Alexandru Ioan Cuza Park, formerly known as "Titan", "I.O.R." (Intreprinderea Optică Română), and "Balta Albă" (The White Pond).

The name of "Titan" comes from a cement factory located here in the 20th century. Starting with the 1950s, the development stage began. In the context of an acute housing crisis, the Titan was chosen for further city development as there were few constructions on it. Large industrial units were built in the vicinity. Construction lasted until the 1970s, when the Alexandru Ioan Cuza Park was also built around the Titan Lake.

Titan consists mostly of housing facilities. The Alexandru Ioan Cuza Park (also known as Titan) is located in the center of the neighborhood. It is one of the biggest parks in Bucharest, with a total surface measuring over 85 ha (210 acres). The park is built around the Titan Lake, which is divided in half by a road bridge and contains five small islands.

Transportation is well-developed, the region being linked to other parts of Bucharest by subway, tram-lines, trolleys, buses, and taxis. The subway stations located in Titan are Nicolae Grigorescu, Titan, Costin Georgian, 1 Decembrie 1918, Nicolae Teclu, and Anghel Saligny.

The most important boulevards are named after Nicolae Grigorescu, Camil Ressu, and Theodor Pallady. The latter is a continuation of the Bucharest–Constanța freeway inside the city. There are several large shopping centres, the biggest ones being Auchan and Cora hypermarkets. The Gloria cinema is sited on the intersection of Baba Novac and Nicolae Grigorescu boulevards.

Nearby neighborhoods include Dristor, Vitan, Dudești, Pantelimon. At the northwestern end of the neighborhood there is the Basarabiei Boulevard and the National Arena.

ParkLake Shopping Center, Bucharest's newest mall, opened its gates for visitors on 1 September 2016. The 70,000 square meters mall is set to be one of Bucharest's top 5 shopping destinations, alongside Băneasa Shopping City, AFI Cotroceni, Sun Plaza, and Mega Mall. ParkLake is located next to the Alexandru Ioan Cuza Park. The mall has more than 200 stores, restaurants and service vendors, a multiplex cinema operated by Cinema City, and a World Class fitness center.

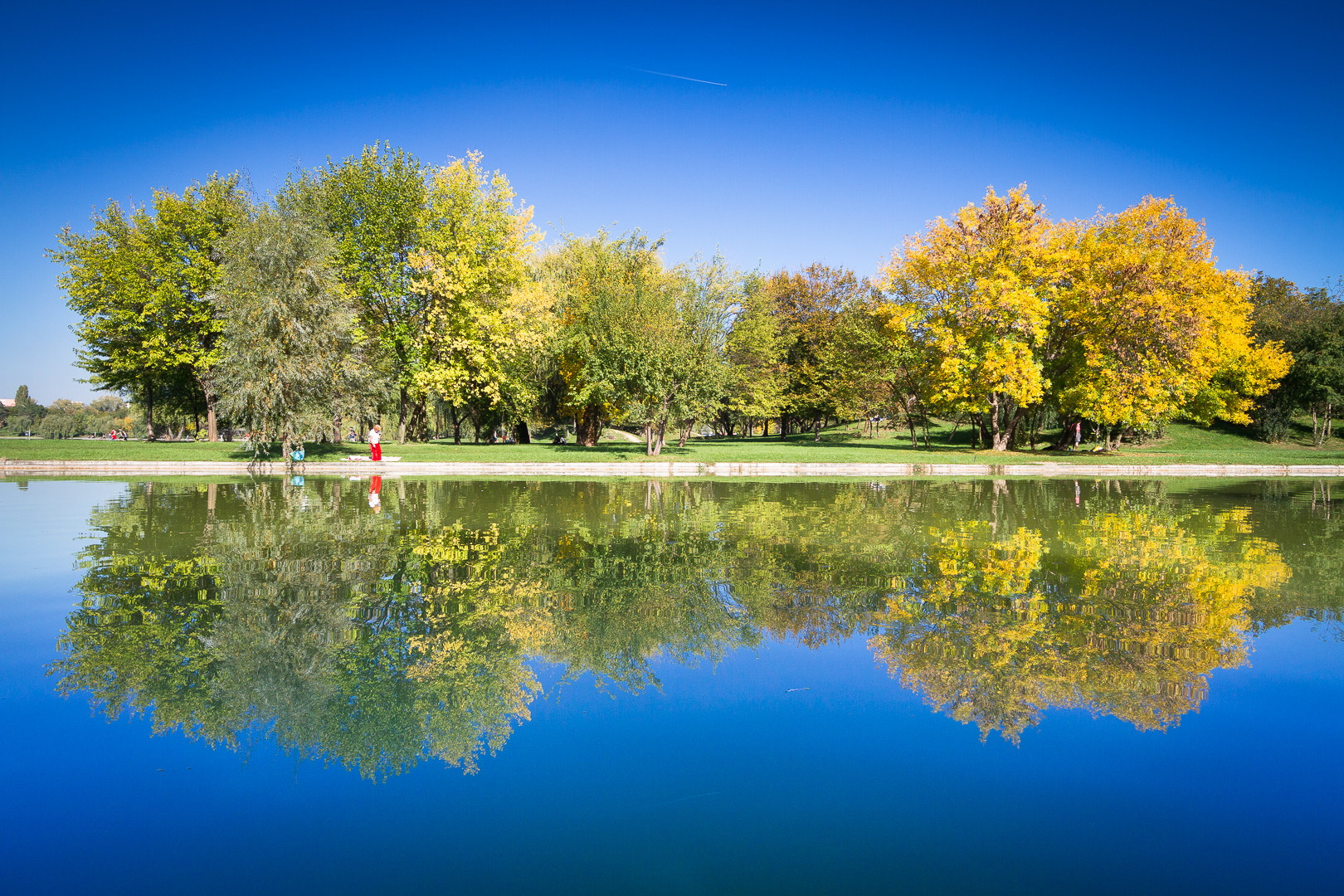
Titan Lake

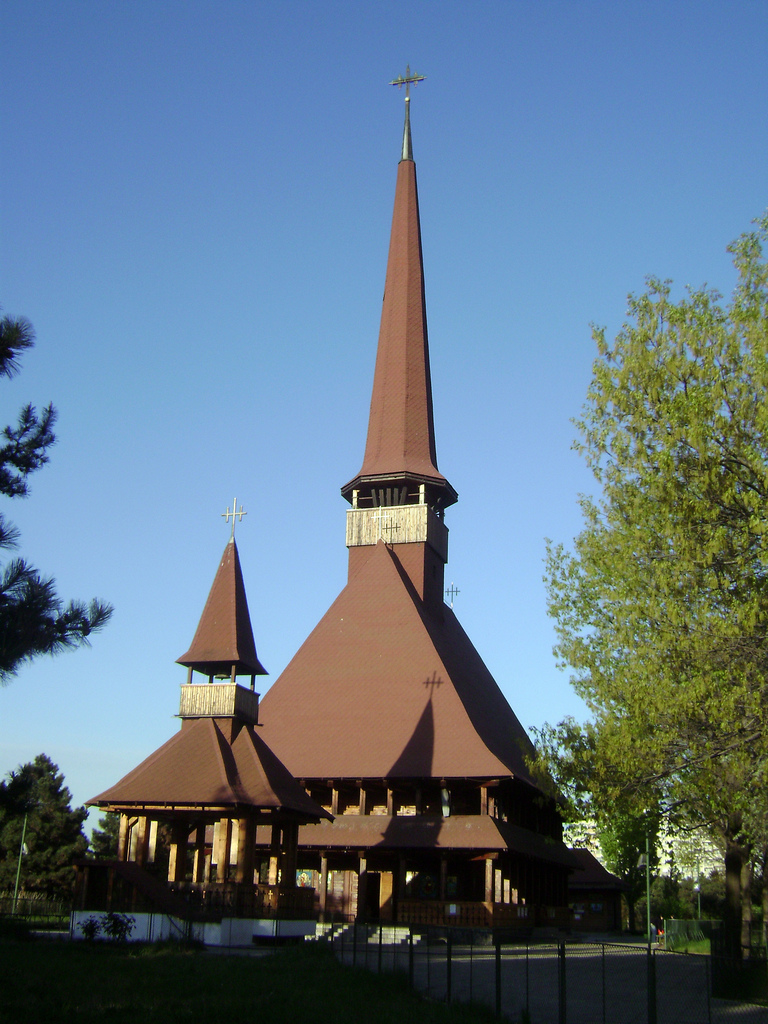
Traditional wooden-style church

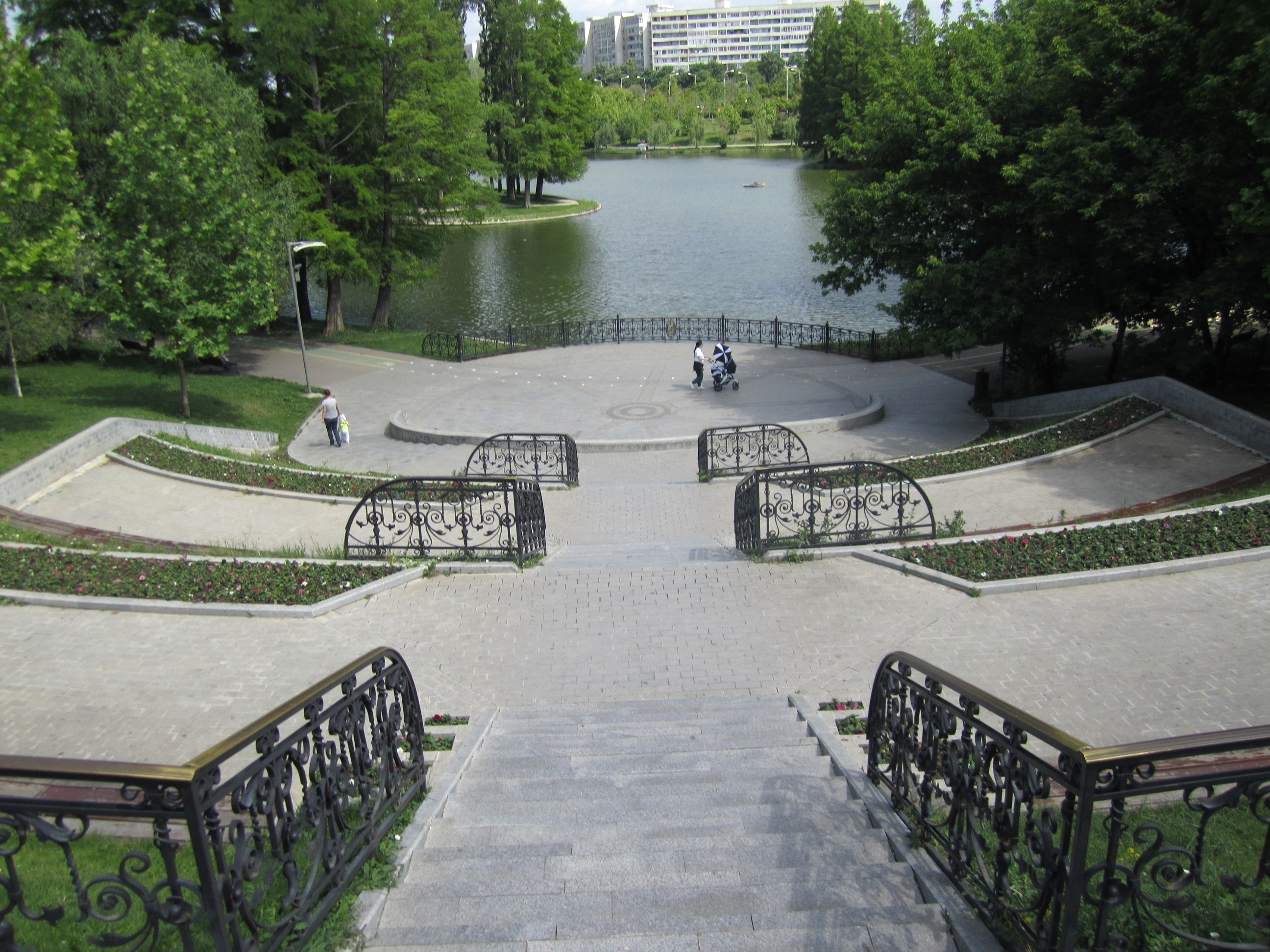
Alexandru Ioan Cuza (Titan) Park

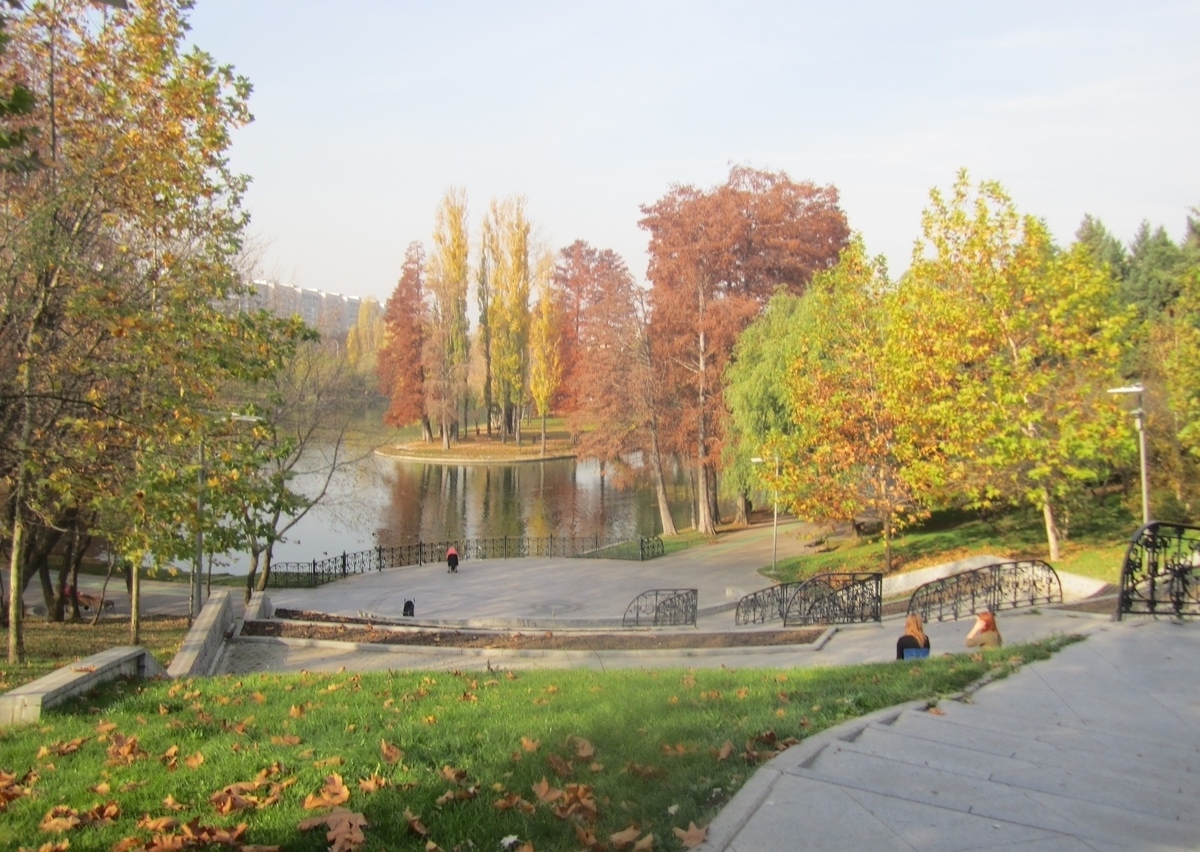
Alexandru Ioan Cuza (Titan) Park

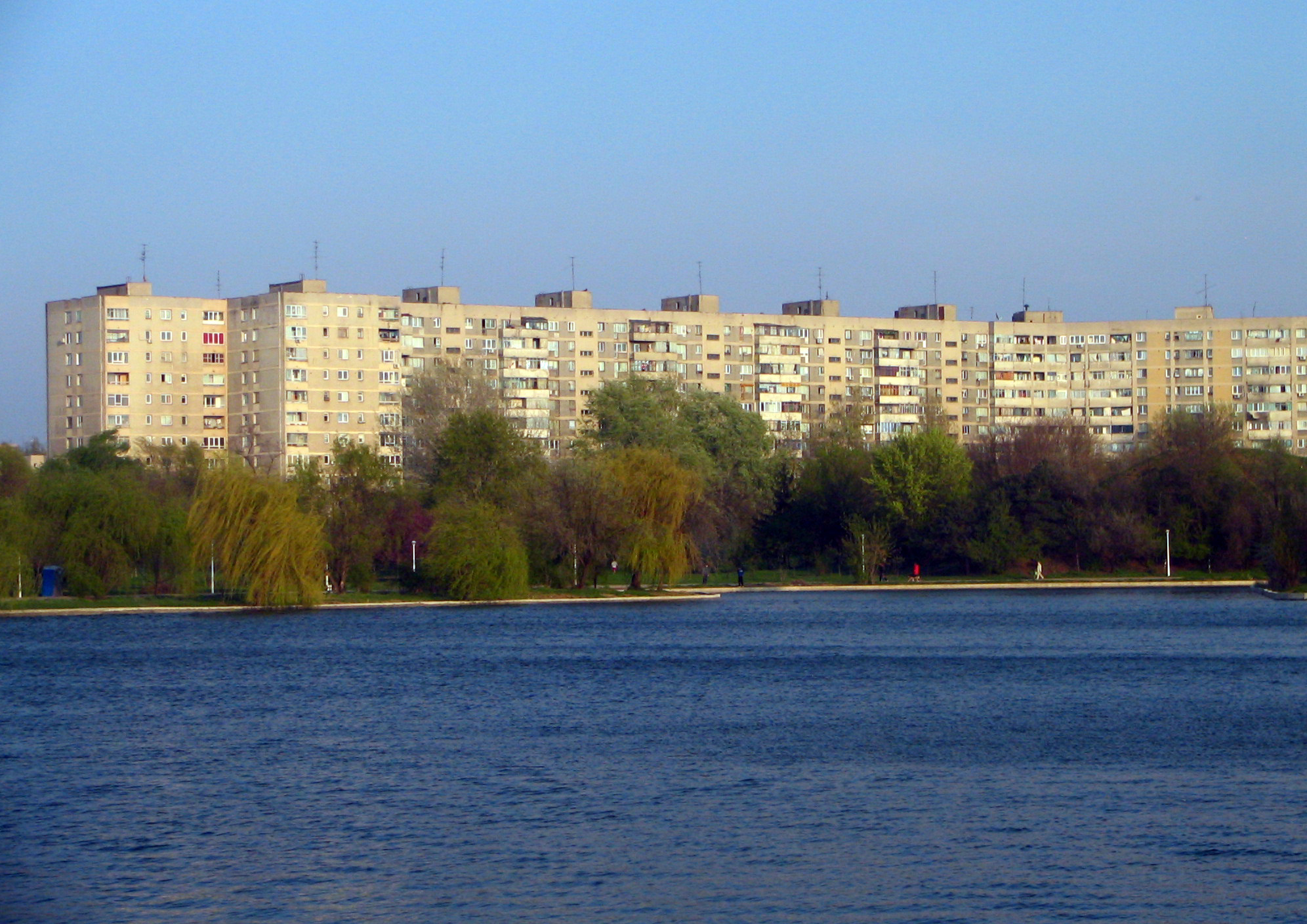
Apartment blocks in Titan, seen from the park

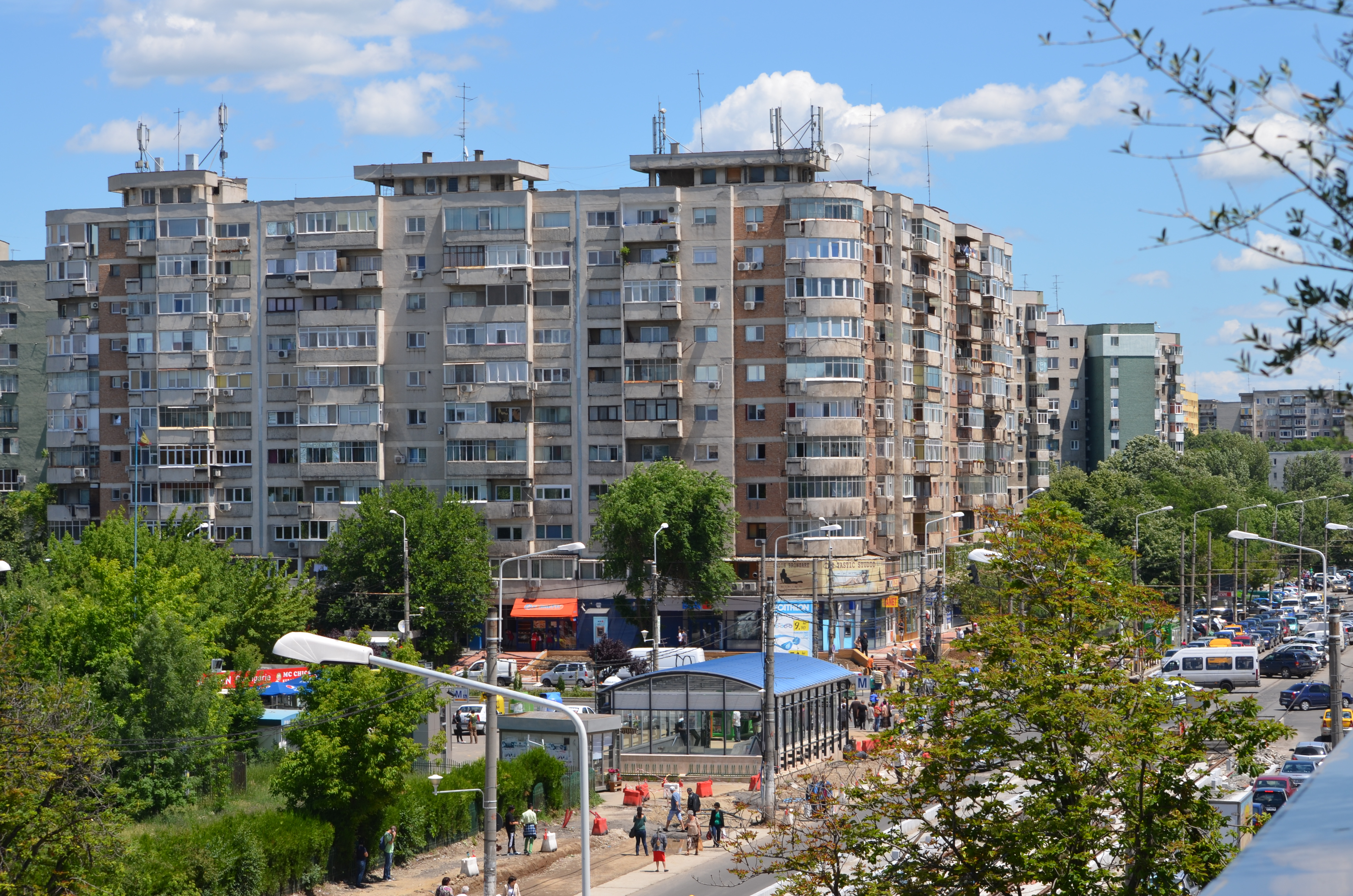
Street scene, Titan

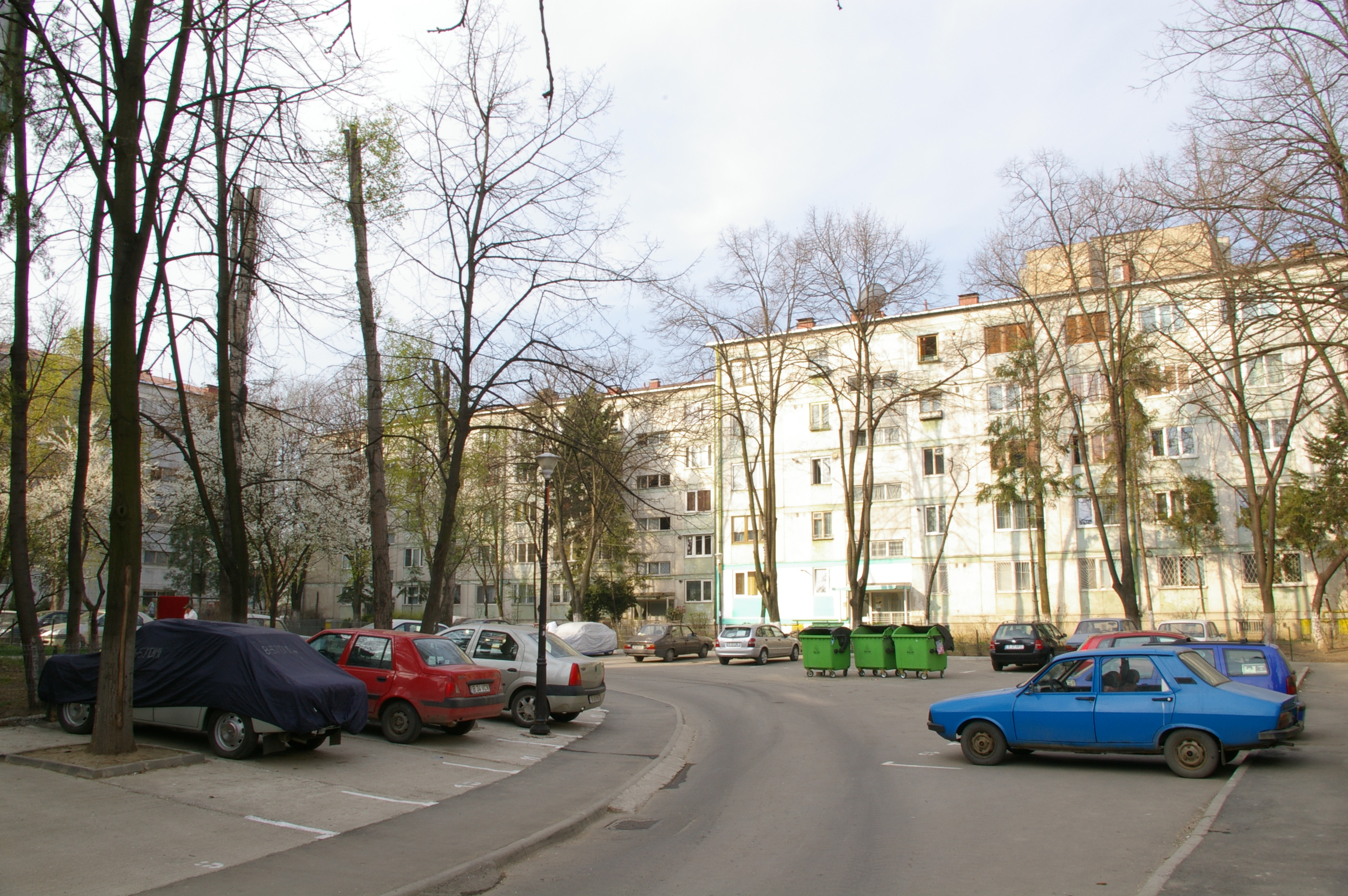
Apartment blocks in Titan

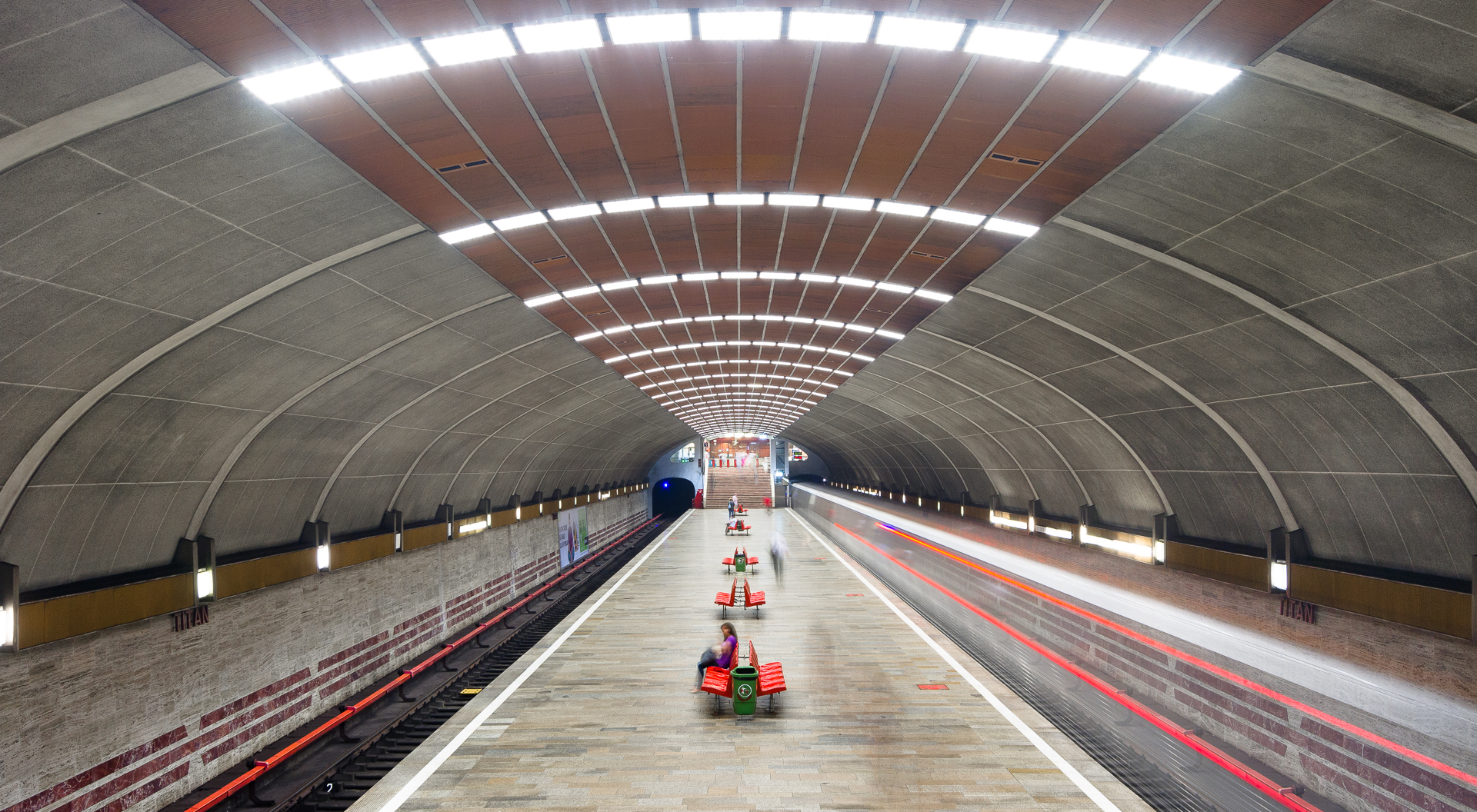
Titan metro station
