= Păcii metro station =

Bucharest metro station

Coordinates: 44°26′03″N 26°00′19″E

Păcii
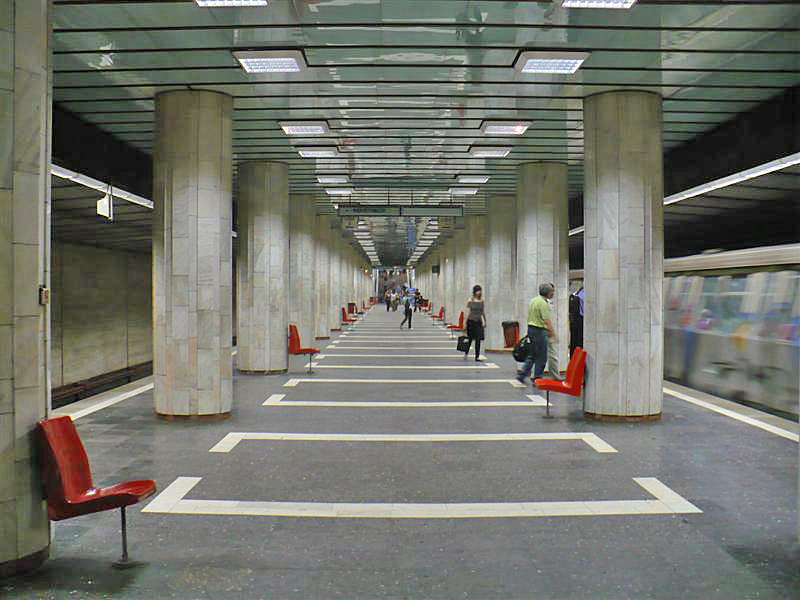
- Metro station in 2009

General information
- Location: Valea cascadelor & Iuliu Maniu Avenues, Militari; Sector 6, Bucharest; Romania
- Platforms: One island platform
- Tracks: 2
- Bus routes: 62, 63, 137, 138, 178, 322, 431, 432, 433, 478.

Construction
- Structure type: Underground

History
- Opened: 19 August 1983

Services
Preceding station	Bucharest Metro	Following station
Preciziei Terminus	Line M3	Gorjului towards Anghel Saligny
Location

Păcii (eng. [of the] peace) is a metro station in Bucharest. Part of the boulevard under which it resides used to bear the station's name. It is located on Iuliu Maniu Avenue at the intersection with Valea Cascadelor Avenue, the latter being a proposal for a new name for the station. The station was opened on 19 August 1983 as part of the extension from Eroilor to Industriilor.

== Extension ==
An extension towards the A1 Motorway and the Western Industrial Park is planned for 2030.
