= Lujerului metro station =

Bucharest metro station

Coordinates: 44.43450°N 26.03370°E

Lujerului
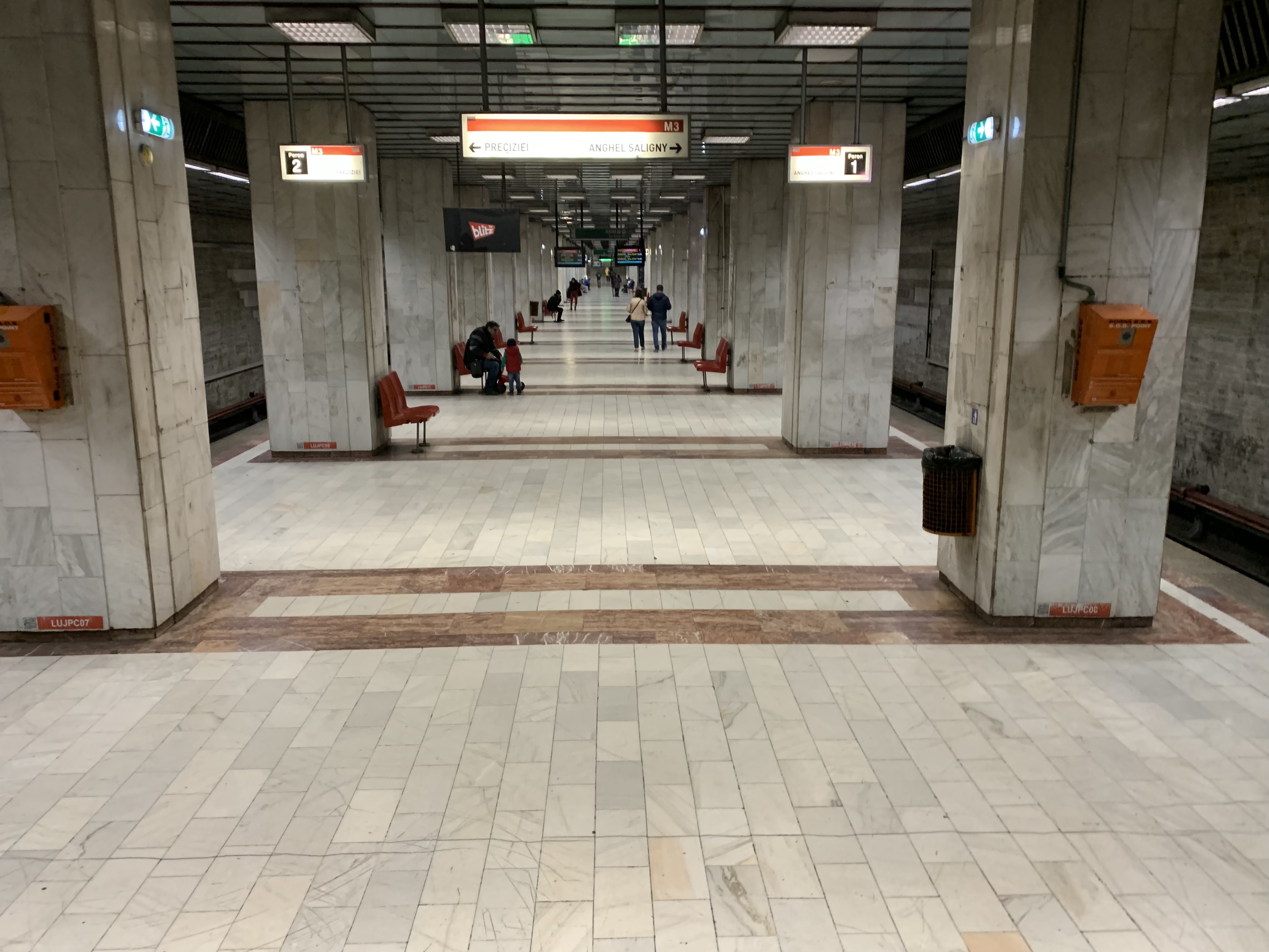

General information
- Location: Virtutii, Lujerului & Iuliu Maniu Avenues, as well as the Lujerului road tunnel, Militari; Sector 6, Bucharest; Romania
- Platforms: One island platform
- Tracks: 2
- Tram routes: 41
- Bus routes: 61, 62, 63, 106, 178, 434, 483.

Construction
- Structure type: Underground

History
- Opened: 19 August 1983

Services
Preceding station	Bucharest Metro	Following station
Gorjului towards Preciziei	Line M3	Politehnica towards Anghel Saligny
Location

Lujerului metro station, previously known as Armata Poporului is a metro station in the Militari neighborhood of Bucharest. It is located at the intersection of Lujerului and Iuliu Maniu Avenues, close to the Lujerului road-tunnel, near the Cotroceni Freight Railway Terminal, the Lujerului Silo, Mills and Bread Factory, and next to the Carrefour Lujerului hypermarket. The metro station also services the Plaza Romania mall.

It was opened on 19 August 1983 as part of the extension from Eroilor to Industriilor and currently serves M3. The station is also of the central platform design, slightly narrower than Politehnica, also built in marble and featuring a color scheme based on white, crimson and shades of gray.

The previous name of the station comes from the former name of the easternmost portion of the Iuliu Maniu Avenue, that was formerly known as Armata Poporului (People's Army). The name of the avenue was changed in 1997 to honor Iuliu Maniu, an inter-war Romanian statesman and to remove all the remaining communist symbolism. However, the name of the metro station stuck, in part because of the reluctance of Metrorex to change station names. In 2009, the name of the station was finally changed to Lujerului, the name of a nearby street and road tunnel.

The light rail line 41, which goes from Ghencea to Piaţa Presei Libere also passes near this metro station.
