= Mihai Bravu =

Mihai Bravu (an alternate Romanian name for Michael the Brave) may refer to several places in Romania:

- Mihai Bravu, Giurgiu, a commune in Giurgiu County
- Mihai Bravu, Tulcea, a commune in Tulcea County
- Mihai Bravu, a village in Roșiori Commune, Bihor County
- Mihai Bravu, a village in Victoria Commune, Brăila County
- Mihai Bravu metro station, Bucharest
