= Nicolae Teclu metro station =

Bucharest metro station

Coordinates: 44°24′27″N 26°11′41″E

M3 Nicolae Teclu
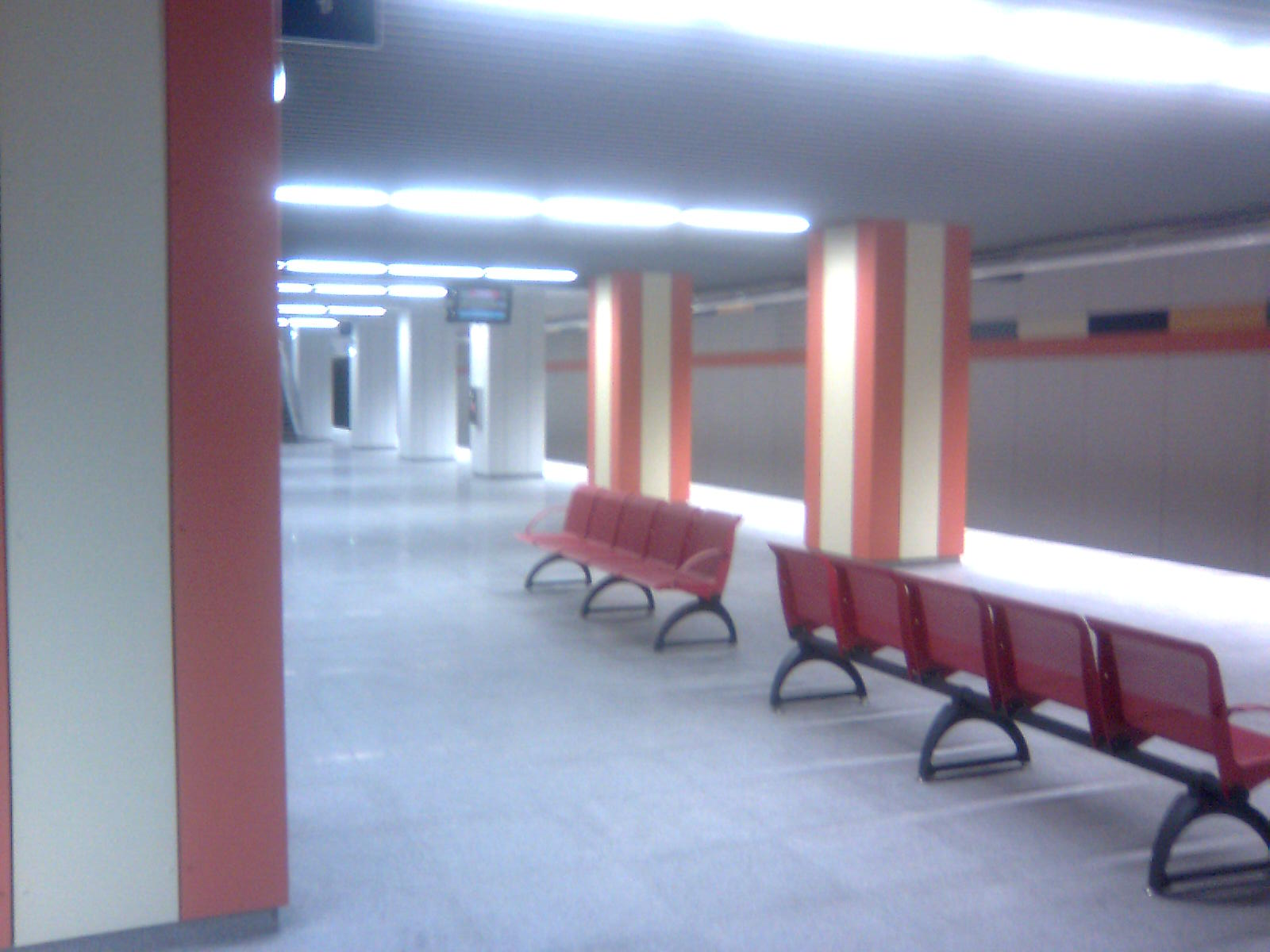

General information
- Location: Theodor Pallady Avenue, Policolor Industrial Area; Sector 3, Bucharest; Romania
- Operator: Metrorex
- Platforms: 1 island platform
- Tracks: 2
- Tram routes: ~~19*~~,~~27*~~,~~40~~
- Bus routes: 246, 405, 408, 472, 480, 627, N111.

Construction
- Structure type: Underground

History
- Opened: 20 November 2008
- Former names: Policolor (2008-2009)

Services
Preceding station	Bucharest Metro	Following station
1 Decembrie 1918 towards Preciziei	Line M3	Anghel Saligny Terminus
Location

Nicolae Teclu, known for a short time as Policolor is a metro station in southeastern Bucharest on Line M3. It is on the Nicolae Grigorescu – Anghel Saligny M3 branch and was opened on 20 November 2008 as part of the extension from Nicolae Grigorescu to Linia de Centură (now Anghel Saligny). Initially, a shuttle started operating between Nicolae Grigorescu and Linia de centura. The regular operation started on 4 July 2009. It is named after Nicolae Teclu, a Romanian chemist.
