= Politehnica =

Politehnica may refer to:

- Politehnica University of Bucharest
- Politehnica University of Timișoara
- Politehnica metro station in Bucharest
- FC Politehnica Timișoara, a football club
