= Politehnica metro station =

Bucharest metro station

Coordinates: 44.43475°N 26.05494°E

Politehnica
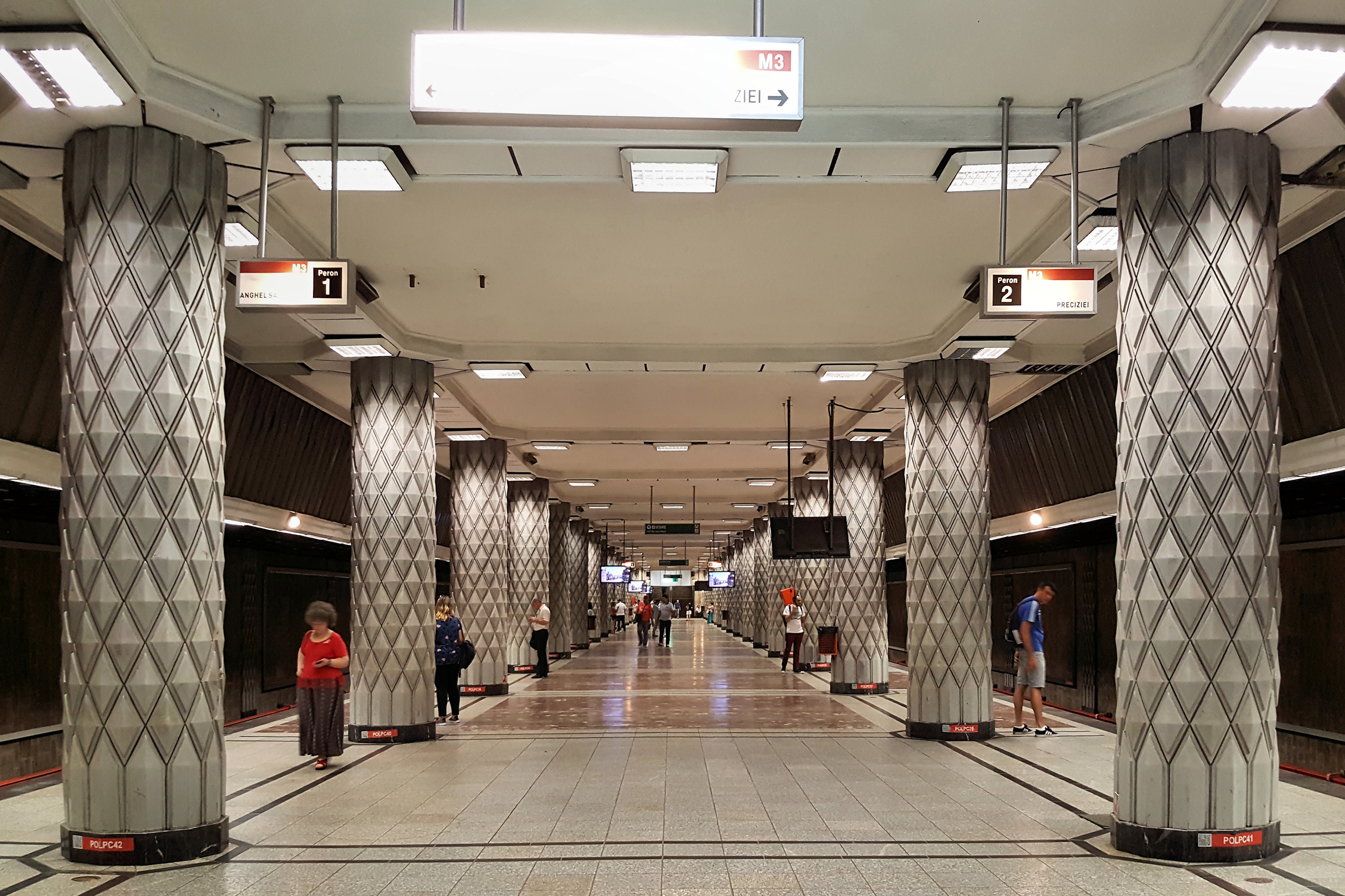
- Metro station in 2016

General information
- Location: Iuliu Maniu Avenue, Militari, near the Bucharest Polytechnic; Sector 6, Bucharest; Romania
- Platforms: One island platform
- Tracks: 2
- Tram routes: 1, 10, 11
- Bus routes: 61, 62, 63, 93, 105, 139.

Construction
- Structure type: Underground

History
- Opened: 19 August 1983

Services
Preceding station	Bucharest Metro	Following station
Lujerului towards Preciziei	Line M3	Eroilor towards Anghel Saligny
Location

Politehnica is a metro station in Bucharest. It is one of the three stations located near the campus of the Universitatea Politehnica București (the other ones being Grozăveşti and Petrache Poenaru). The station was opened on 19 August 1983 as part of the extension from Eroilor to Industriilor.

The station also services the Faculty of Journalism of the University of Bucharest and its campus, the Apaca textiles factory and the headquarters of Vodafone Romania.

However, it sees relatively little traffic, as there are no residential quarters nearby, the area is extremely well serviced by RATB buses and trolleybuses, serving more useful routes than the subway and some Politehnica students use the more convenient Grozăveşti station.

The station is built around a wide, central platform, with exits at both ends of the station. The floor is built in black granite and marble, with brown walls and white ceiling supported by two rows of thick, round grey marble-clad columns.

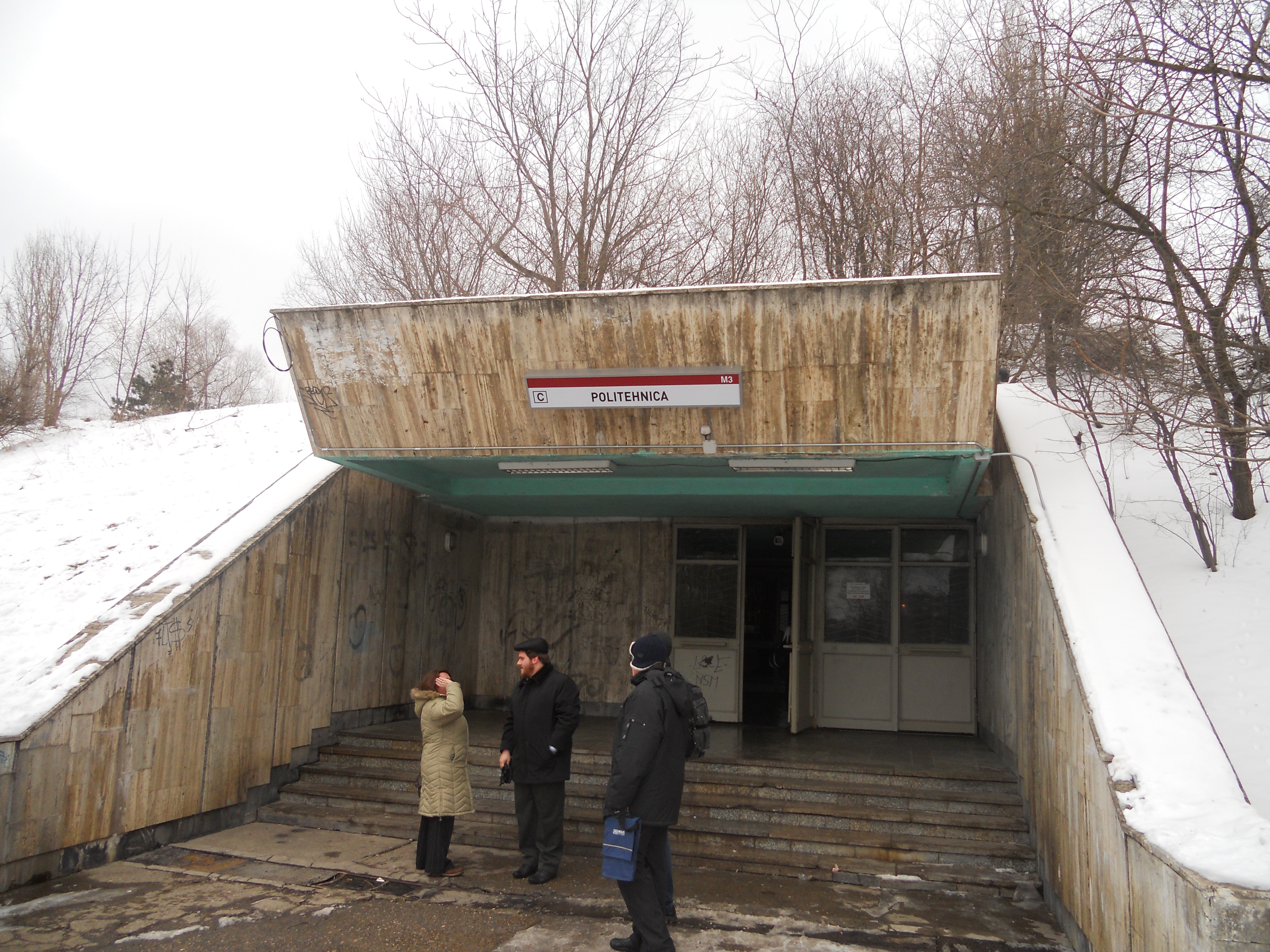
An entrance to the station
