= Apartment Building 63 =

Apartment building in Bucharest, Romania

Coordinates: 44°25′17.1″N 26°8′22.2″E

Apartment Building 63, also called Commune 63 (Romanian Comuna 63) is an apartment building located in the Dristor neighbourhood in the south-eastern part of Bucharest (Sectorul 3) and it is the largest single residential building in Romania with a total of 950 one-room apartments, and holding just over 1,600 residents, although up to 2,500 people may be living there. The building is nicknamed the commune because of the large number of apartments that could house an entire village or commune, and because of the long corridors that stretch from one end of the building to the other and resemble a long country road. The apartment building has four staircases of 10 floors each and is built in the shape of a giant Z with an extension in the southern part of the structure. It is located near the Dristor metro station, a major node of the Bucharest Metro's railway network.

== History ==
Apartment Building 63 was finished and opened in 1963 and was first intended to be inhabited by officers of the Romanian Armed Forces and of the Ministry of Administration and Interior. In the same year, the selected officers started to move into the apartments from the first two staircases of the building but because of the intensive demolition projects undergone in the area, the original purpose of the building was changed, and the structure's role was to serve as a new home for the people that had to move from their demolished houses. The building was considered by the Romanian Communist Party to be a symbol of the centralized state and an outstanding feat of engineering designed for the citizen comrade in the vision of the communist perspective. Another four sister buildings, built in the same year, are scattered across the eastern part of Bucharest; one of them is near Mihai Bravu Avenue, called Block P10 on Oborul Nou Street, and another one is called Block M31, located on Aleea Barajul Bicaz.
