= Titan metro station =

Bucharest metro station

Coordinates: 44°25′30″N 26°09′46″E

Titan
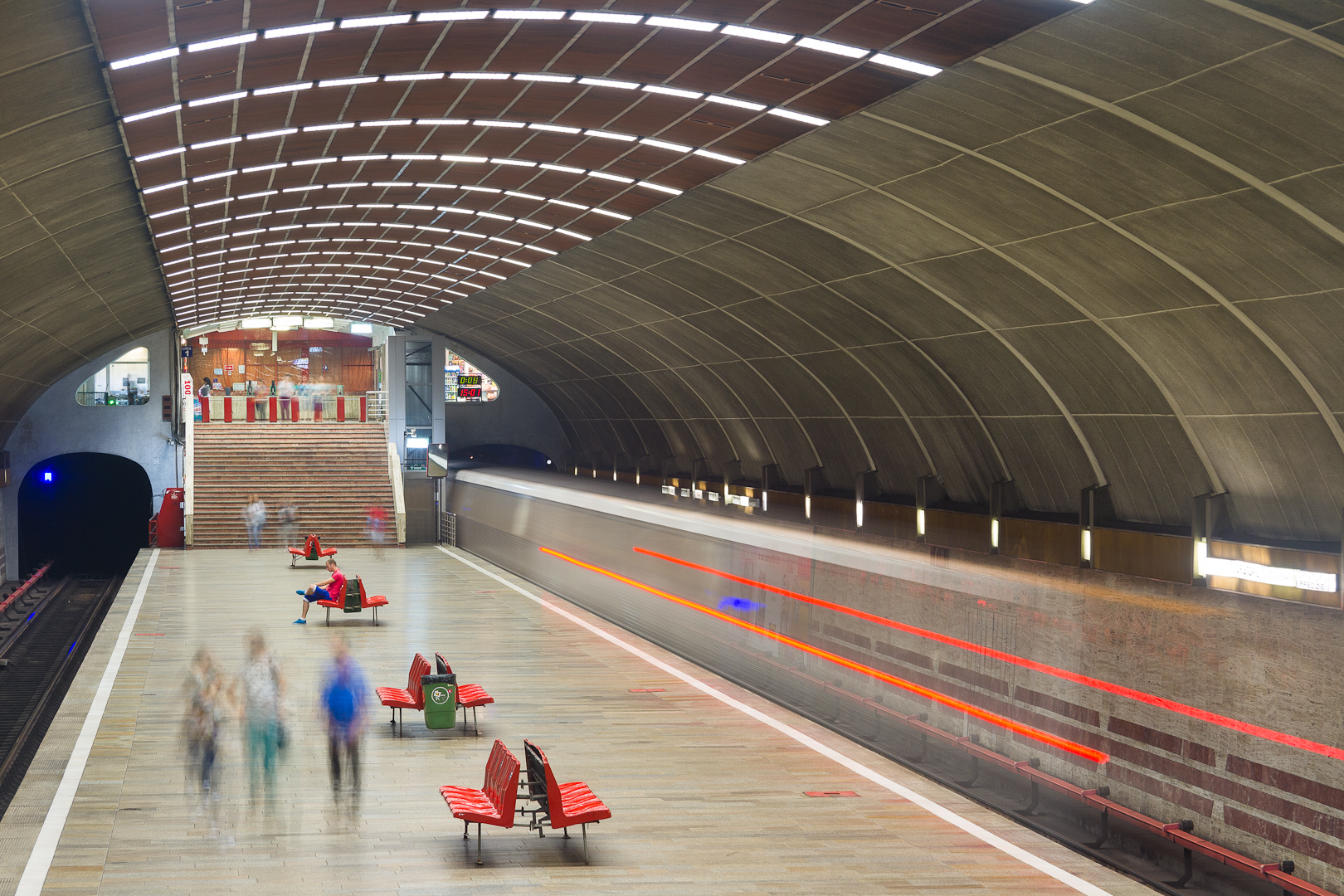

General information
- Location: Titan Park; Sector 3, Bucharest; Romania
- Platforms: 1 island platform
- Tracks: 2
- Tram routes: 23, 27, 49
- Bus routes: 102, 243, 253, 311, 330, 335.

Construction
- Structure type: deep single-vault

History
- Opened: 28 December 1981

Services
Preceding station	Bucharest Metro	Following station
Nicolae Grigorescu towards Dristor 2	Line M1	Costin Georgian towards Republica
Location

Titan is a metro station in Bucharest located in the Titan district. The station services the now rather obsolete shopping center, the large Titan Park and the district's dense population. The station was opened on 28 December 1981 as part of the second phase of Line 1 between Timpuri Noi and Republica.

The station is an open-vault metro station, the largest without any support pillars on the network. To facilitate construction, impressive efforts had to be done: the soil was frozen for 90 days, and the technology used to make it was also one of the few technologies imported from other countries to construct the metro.
