= Costin Georgian metro station =

Bucharest metro station

Coordinates: 44°26′07″N 26°10′08″E

Costin Georgian
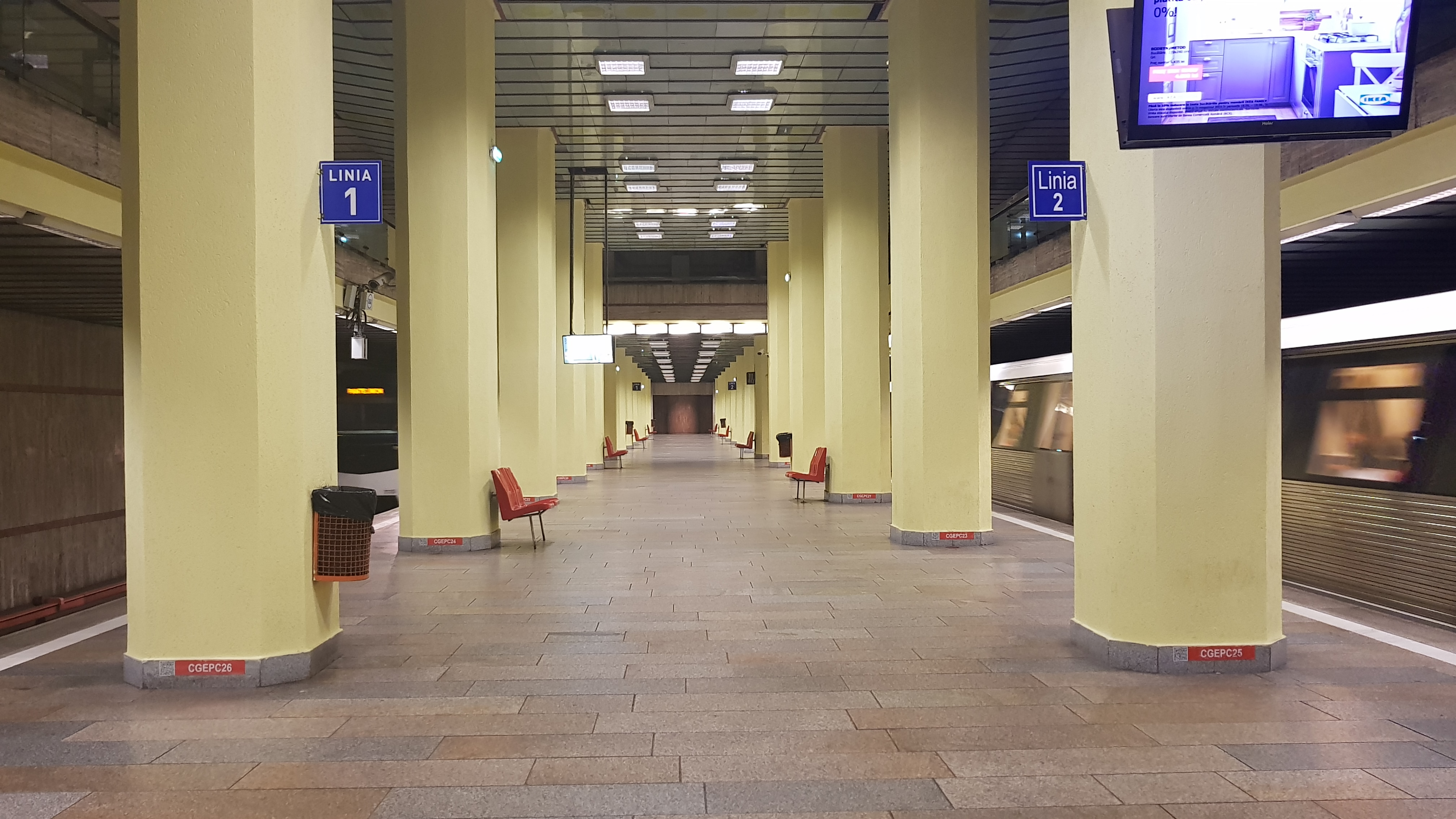
- Metro station in 2018

General information
- Location: Titan, near Basarabia bus Terminal; Sector 3, Bucharest; Romania
- Platforms: 1 island platform
- Tracks: 2
- Tram routes: None, due to ongoing tram line modernization works
- Bus routes: 69, 79, 102, 253, 455, 640.

Construction
- Structure type: Underground

History
- Opened: 28 December 1981

Services
Preceding station	Bucharest Metro	Following station
Titan towards Dristor 2	Line M1	Republica Terminus
Location

Costin Georgian is a metro station in Bucharest; it was opened on 28 December 1981 as part of the second phase of Line 1 between Timpuri Noi and Republica. Formerly named Muncii after the eponymous boulevard that run just north (now Basarabia Blvd.), the station was chosen in 1992 to honor the late engineer Costin Georgian, General Manager of the Metro operator Metrorex, after his sudden death on 25 August 1992, the eve of the Basarab station opening day.
