= Militari Shopping =

Shopping center in Bucharest, Romania

Coordinates: 44.4395°N 25.9822°E

Militari Shopping is a retail park situated in the Militari district of Bucharest, Romania. Located on Iuliu Maniu Boulevard, it has 51,400 square metres (553,000 sq ft) of floor space.

Beside the Auchan hypermarket and Praktiker DIY store, the shopping center hosts another 61 shops. For kids, Militari Shopping hosts shops such as Imaginarium, Toyplex, Okaidi and Sergent Major that sell toys, clothing, accessories and educational material.
