= Militari =

District of Bucharest, Romania

Coordinates: 44°26′3.37″N 26°2′5.11″E

Militari on the map of Bucharest

Militari is a district in the western part of Bucharest, in Sector 6. It is home to more than 100,000 inhabitants.

== History ==
=== Early history ===
Starting from the sixteenth century, this area was the site of several estates owned by boyars, and on it was an area where the Austrian army camped during its march towards joining the Russo-Ottoman war of 1735-1739, only for them to be pushed away the following year by Constantine Mavrocordatos with the support of Ottoman troops. On 16 March 1821, Tudor Vladimirescu sets camp in this area along with his Panduri in order to begin his botched uprising. The significance of this place later gave the name to the Drumul Taberei housing estate built south of Militari in the 1960s and also the Tudor Vladimirescu Theorethical Highschool.

The first military establishments in the area eventually are founded in 1863, which established a military camp meant to be used to train soldiers before eventually relocating west of Tecuci in 1869. Later in 1873, the Army's Pyrotechnical Complex was moved here along with the 30th Military Engineering Regiment and its barracks. By the end of the 19th century, a full military complex was established in the area, featuring a weapons depot, a factory for military clothing and a storage area for firewood. In March 1894, the Romanian Army expelled two pub owners (Gheorghe Grigore and Niculae Niță) and the inhabitants of these public houses to build the 40th Infantry Regiment.

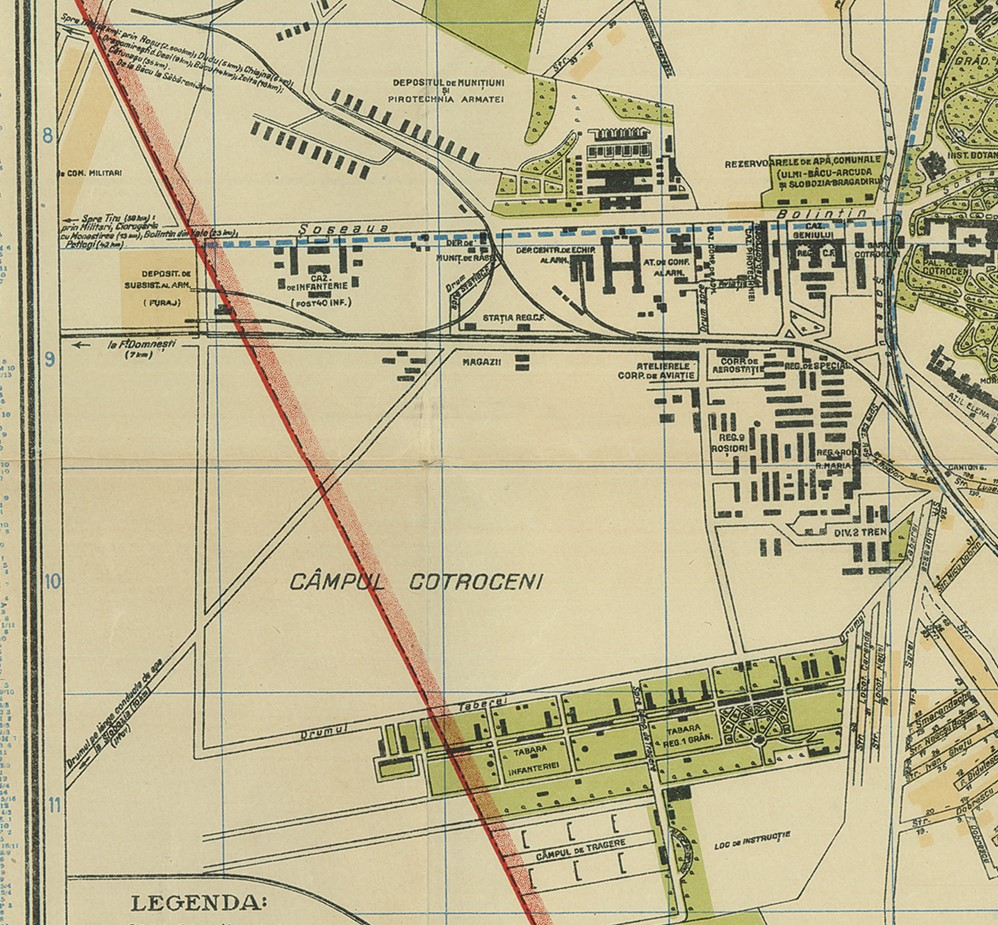
Map from 1921 showing the military establishments and railway lines west of the Cotroceni Palace

With the development of the military establishments in the area, several railways appeared at the same time, serving the Gara de Nord and Gara Filaret railway stations, along with a railway line going to the present-day Bucharest Belt Railway.

The commune of Militari is first mentioned in 1883, in a document relating to the sale of state-owned land, and in 1901, it is mentioned in the Great Geographic Dictionary of Romania as being part of plasa Snagov, with a total of 293 hectares (stretching all the way to the present-day Grivița and Crângași) and having a population of 584 people and a mixed school with 32 male students and 9 female students. It also had a brick factory and a watermill. In the early 20th century the village attracted the attention of local politicians due to the existence of an illegal cattle market which led to the closure of an official cattle market in the city of Bucharest. In 1906, a law was passed which reshaped the communes in the present-day Ilfov County; the Militari commune administered the villages of Militari and Grivița along with the Ciurel hamlet (cătun), all of which belonged to the plasa Pantelimon.

After the First World War, between 1920 and 1926, the commune of Militari lost the village of Grivița and the hamlet of Ciurel; in addition the Bolintin Road (Drumul Bolintinului), the main road going through the commune was renamed into Alexander I, Unifier of Yugoslavia Avenue. In 1926, the commune lost the hamlet of Giulești, which became its own commune, being renamed into Prince Carol II commune (and later in 1930 Great Voyvode Michael) commune.

Like most suburban communes of Bucharest, Militari was left to develop by itself without a proper development plan, as such population surged from just 584 inhabitants in 1901 to 8093 inhabitants in 1930 and 15.492 inhabitants by the 1948 census. Due to the lack of a development plan and laws prohibiting development of suburban communes, most of the land was split up illegally, and "almost overnight" new roads (with improper names) and houses were built. According to the same census taken on 25 January 1948, among the 3320 dwellings, only 351 had electricity and 3 had running water, and 62,7% of the houses were built from wood and thatched materials and 36,4% were made out of brick, stone or concrete.

The first steps in the modernization of the commune began in 1941 with the official naming of several streets that, some still maintain their name to this day (Apusului, Cupolei, Apeductului), followed by a more major program launched in 1942 to allow the introduction of public lightning, cesspools and communal guarding. In addition to this, in 1943, a new shuttle tram line (nr 13) began to operate between Apusului street and the Cotroceni railway crossing, utilizing a single track path with passing loops. In an article dated 4 October 1944 however, the Scânteia newspaper criticised the way how public works were conducted in the commune and accused the local administration of theft of public funds and clientelism.

=== Postwar era ===
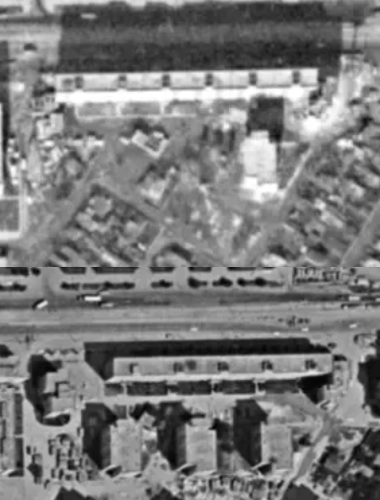
Block OD16 before and after the earthquake, seen from KH-9

In 1948, tram line 13 ceased to run for two years while public works were conducted in relation to the sewage network in the village, works which continued up to 1950 and also resulted in the full double-tracking of line 13, which was then extended to Pantelimon. With the administrative reform of 1950, the Militari commune eventually became part of the city of Bucharest, specifically part of the 16 February District. The first housing program at the time involved the construction of semi-detached houses in the 1950s. At the same time the military clothes factory became the APACA factory, whose buildings still stand to this day (albeit for other purposes). The first block was finished in 1958 and it is believed to be the first apartment building in Bucharest to use prefabricated panels at the time, situated at Iuliu Maniu Avenue nr 10.

Between 1965 and 1968, the first apartment blocks in the Militari housing estate were built as part of an urban renewal program meant to replace the old substandard houses built in the interwar era. Although the program fell short of expectations (fewer apartment blocks were built than planned), it did offer people various modern apartments with one, two, three or even four rooms, and new markets at Apusului, Veteranilor and Gorjului. The redevelopment occurred at the same time as the opening of the Militari industrial estate, which hosted the IREMOAS factory for bathtubs, radiators and sinks, and later the IMEB factory for electric motors and the National Research and Development Institute for Aerospace, which was connected to the Turbomecanica factory. Also in 1968, works began on rebuilding the road, replacing the cobblestone with asphalt and extending the main avenue (then named Armata Poporului, Păcii and RSR respectively, now named Iuliu Maniu Avenue) towards the city limits on the existing road to Ciorogârla, during the construction works for the A1 motorway, which opened in 1972. The new campus of the Bucharest Polytechnic Institute was built here between the late 1960s and up to the early 1980s, gradually relocating from its old campus near Gara de Nord.

Construction of apartment blocks continued with a few built between 1971 and 1973 in various empty plots of land and near the remaining military establishments or places otherwise not occupied by houses, followed by more demolitions starting in 1974 to replace substandard housing, which saw the rise of apartment blocks on the south side of the (present day) Iuliu Maniu avenue west of Lujerului. In the same year the Militari tram depot opened to host the ITB's 130-strong fleet of Tatra T4R trams. Among some of the most imposing buildings in the housing estate, Block 15A/B/C (a group of tower blocks with 16 stories) and Block 22B (designed by Yugoslavian architects) were finished in 1979. In the 4 March 1977 Vrancea earthquake, Block OD16's Staircase F collapsed entirely, killing most of its inhabitants. At the time, the building was slightly over a year old and results showed poor construction practices and stolen construction materials; this staircase was only rebuilt 5 years later. During this period, the Ștefan Gheorghiu Academy's new building opened and its students moved in for the 1975-1976 school year, in order to train future Romanian Communist Party elites (today the building is an annex of the Polytechnic).

In the 1980s urban renewal works continued, firstly demolishing the remaining houses left in the core of the former village in the early 1980s, which was supplemented by the construction of metro line M3 between 1980 and 1983, followed by the realignement of Șoseaua Virtuții and the construction of new apartment buildings north of Lujerului and near the village of Roșu in the late 1980s. Between 1986 and 1987, the Lujerului Underpass was built, which necessitated the demolition of Block 2, a tower block with 60 one-room apartments that was only 20 years old at the time of its demolition. Simultaneously, the tram tracks on Păcii and Armata Poporului Avenues was replaced during the summer of 1986 with new ones used from prefabricated concrete slabs. Shortly after the works were completed in October 1986, the new tram tracks were dismantled and the track slabs were relocated elsewhere. Several small houses and semi-detached houses have survived to this day.

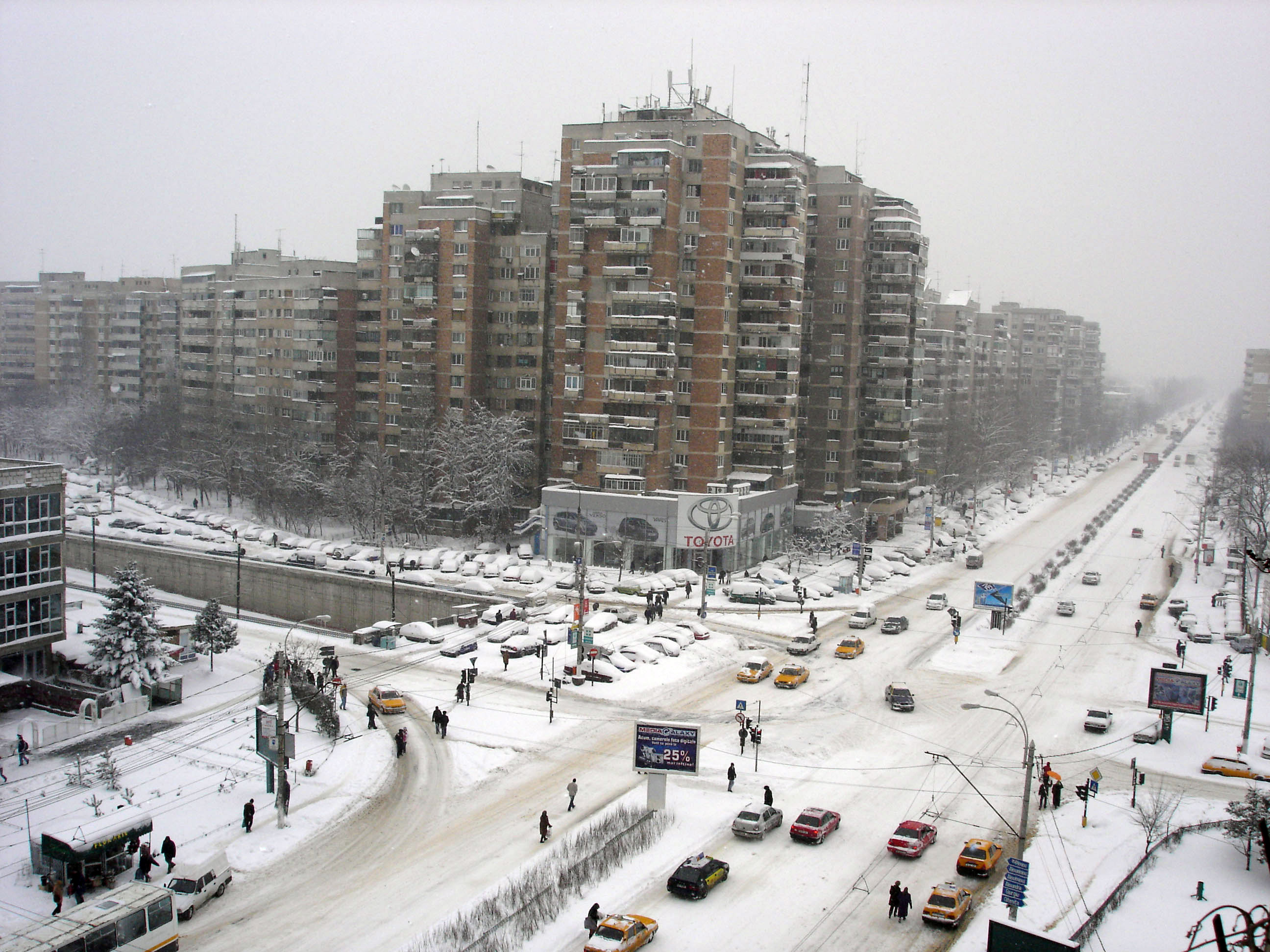
Block 15A/B/C and the Lujerului square (foreground) in 2005

Despite the construction of new apartment blocks in the communist era, the Militari housing estate has maintained its original street layout. Due to its location on the A1 motorway, the Iuliu Maniu Avenue now suffers from chronic traffic congestion, and notoriously lacks parks (the only park in the area is built over a former industrial railway). Expansion of commercial and other private industrial and residential areas has begun in the early 2000s and continues to this day, but in a similar fashion to the interwar era, putting more strain on the area's street network. The industrial estate still remains an important employer in the western part of Bucharest.

== Features ==
The neighborhood features a few markets, including Gorjului, Lujerului, and Apusului (similar markets are found in most communist-era housing estates, such as the Sălăjan market in Titan, as well as the Moghioroș and Orizont markets in Drumul Taberei).

The housing estate is served by line M3 of the Bucharest Metro, which runs from Preciziei (in the middle of the Militari industrial estate) to Anghel Saligny in the Titan industrial estate, at its opening in 1983 linked it with Republica. In 1999, service on line M3 was shortened to Eroilor before being extended to Anghel Saligny in 2009. Trolleybuses, which initially ran from 1960 to 1967 returned to the housing estate in 1995 and consist of two lines: 61, which runs to Piața Rosetti and 62 which runs to Gara de Nord. It is also served by city bus lines such as 106, 136, 137, 138, 178, 278 and 336. Tram lines still operate in the Militari industrial estate, having been relocated to Drumul Taberei in 1987 and modernized in 2005. The high rate of car ownership however makes parking extremely difficult and increasingly inconvenient for pedestrians.

Because of its access to the A1 motorway, the district developed rapidly following the Romanian Revolution of 1989, transforming itself in one of the most prosperous neighborhoods of Bucharest. Since the early 2000s the district saw the opening of several hypermarkets (Cora, Carrefour, Metro, Auchan, Kaufland), and a large mall ("Plaza Romania"). The district has a new theatre ("Masca") and a modern cinema ("Movieplex"). The industrial estate features a depot for trams, buses and metro trains, a Renault parts centre (built on the first Coca Cola factory from the early 1990s) and the previously mentioned Aerospace Institute.

== Gallery ==
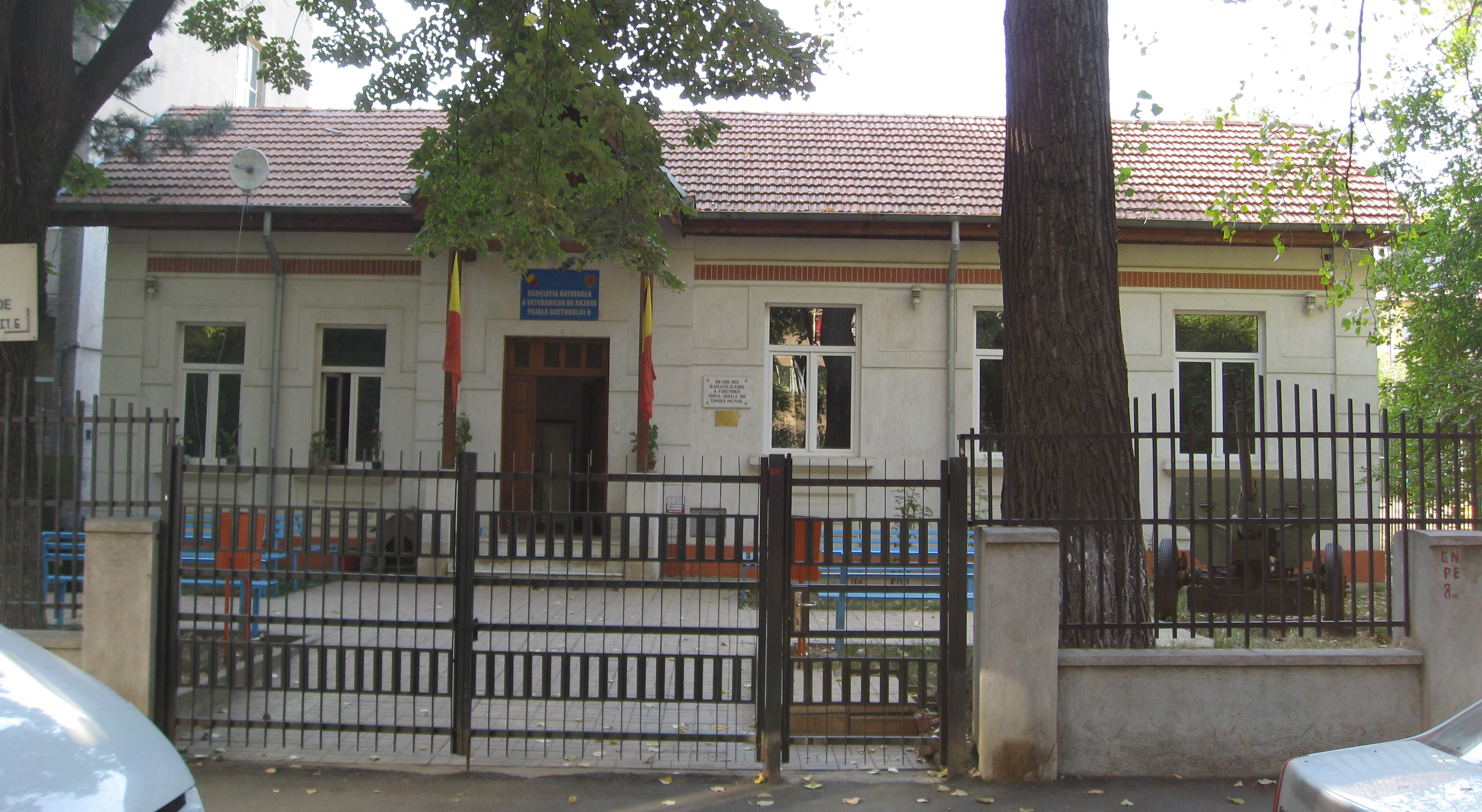
Militari's first school (1863), now a veterans' association chapter

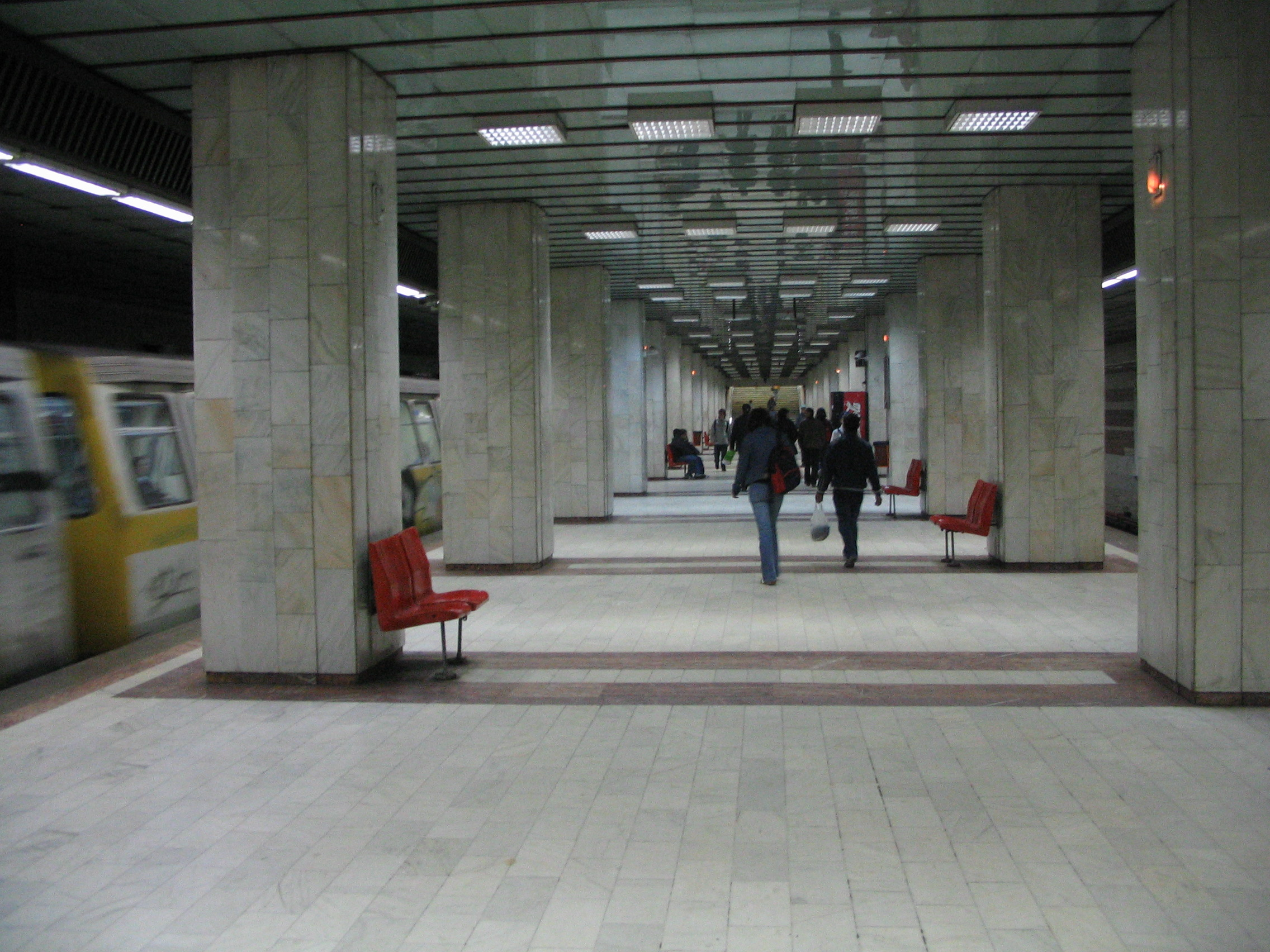
Lujerului metro station in Militari

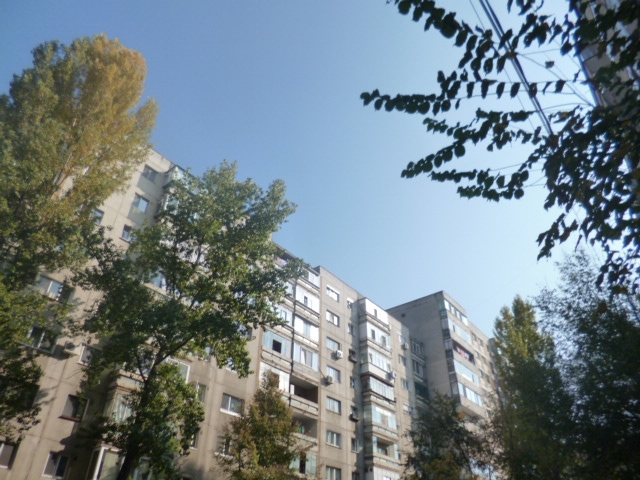
Apartment blocks in Militari

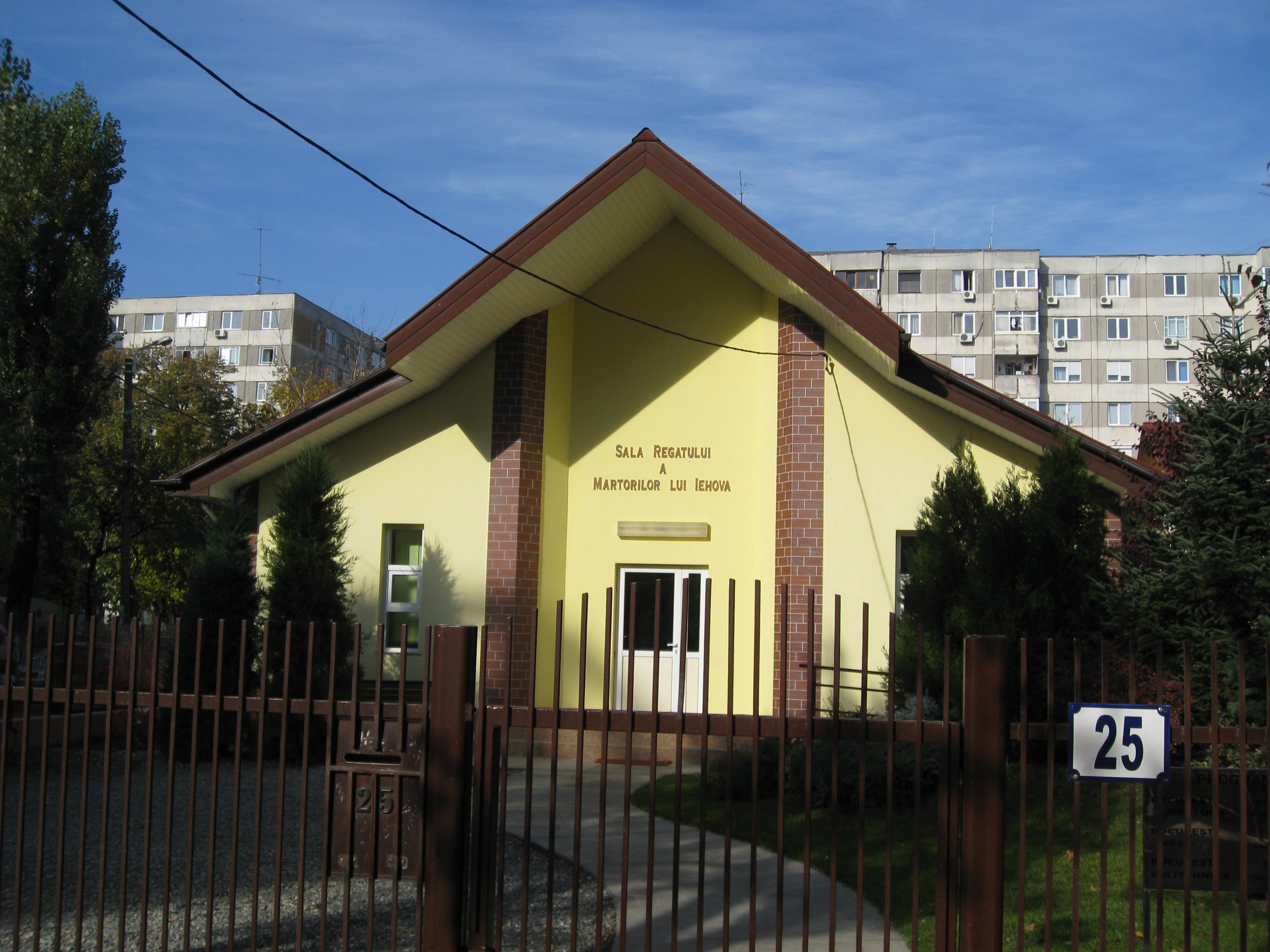
A Jehovah's Witnesses Kingdom Hall in Militari

== See also ==
- Militari Shopping Center
