= Dristor =

Neighborhood in Bucharest, Romania

Coordinates: 44°25′10.26″N 26°8′21.49″E

Dristor on the map of Bucharest

Dristor is a neighborhood located in the southeastern part of Bucharest, Romania. It is bordered to the north by Baba Novac Street, to the south by Răcari Street, to the west by Mihai Bravu Street, and to the east by Fizicienilor Street. Nearby districts include Dudești, Vitan, Văcărești, and Titan. The Dristor metro station is a major node of Bucharest Metro's network.

Before the 1960s, there were no apartment buildings in the area; however, the first buildings were completed between 1961 and 1963, at the same time when the Comuna 63 building was completed (they were part of the initial development of the nearby Titan housing estate). The houses were mostly demolished in stages and then replaced by apartment buildings later in 1976–1977 and 1984–1989.

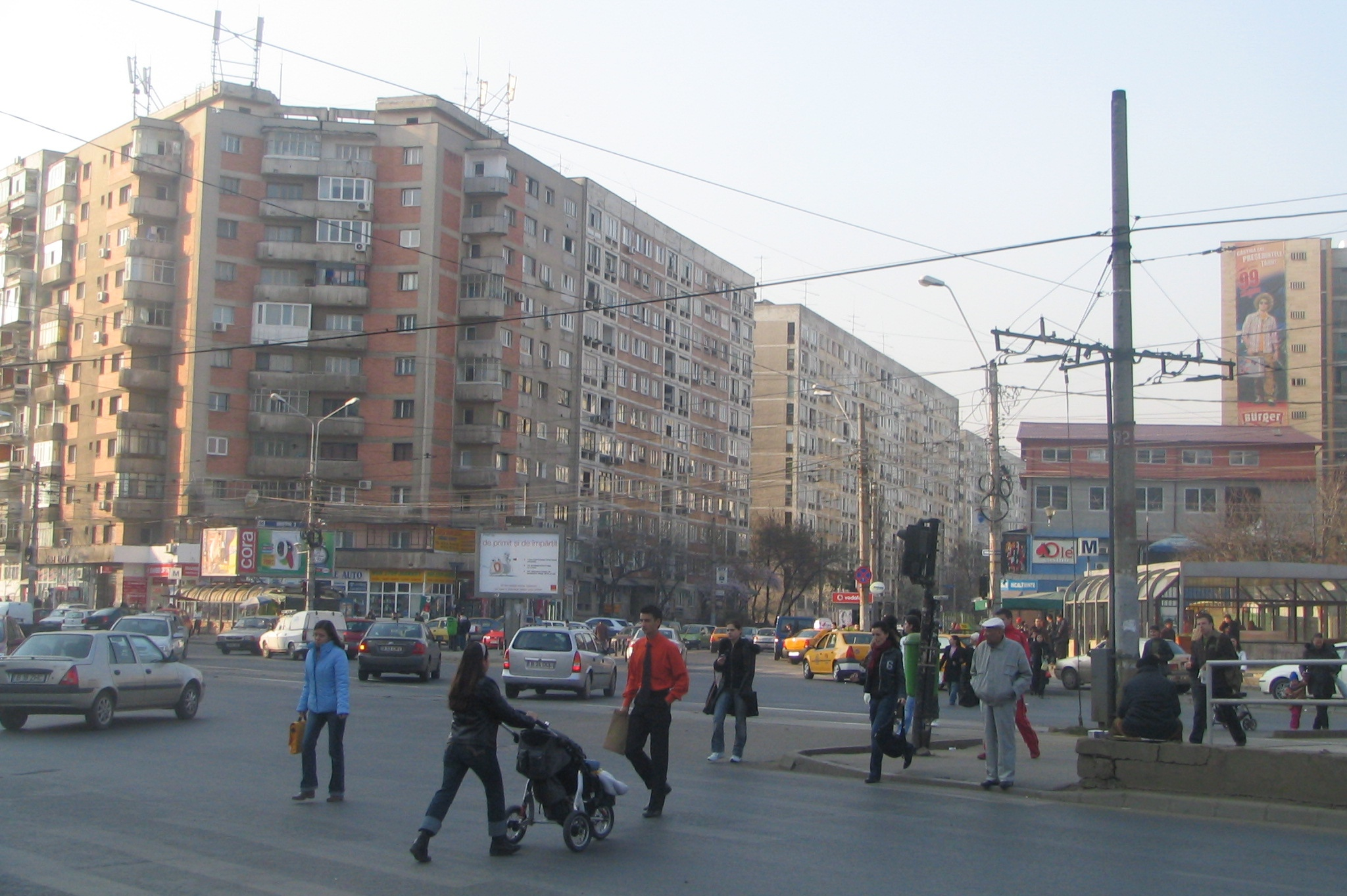
Dristor ~2007-2009
