= Dristor metro station =

Bucharest metro station

Dristor
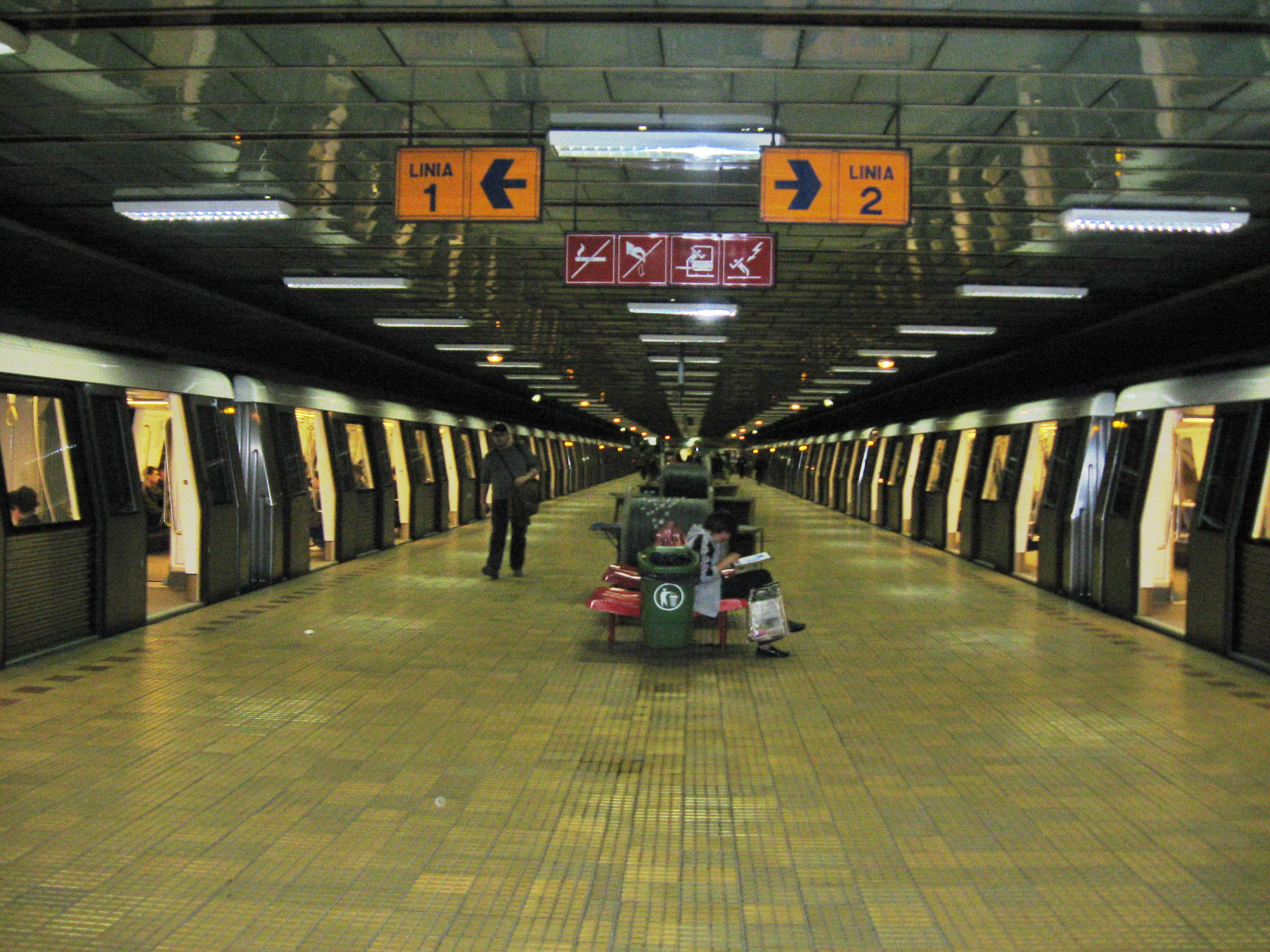
- Dristor 2 station

General information
- Location: Camil Ressu Blvd., Dristor; Sector 3, Bucharest; Romania
- Coordinates: 44°25′10.5″N 26°08′24″E
- Platforms: Two island platforms; one for each station
- Tracks: 4
- Tram routes: 1, 10, 23, 27
- Bus routes: 135, 330, 619, 627

Construction
- Structure type: Underground

History
- Opened: 28 December 1981 (Terminal 1); 17 August 1989 (Terminal 2)

Services
Preceding station	Bucharest Metro	Following station
Terminus	Line M1	Piaţa Muncii towards Republica
Mihai Bravu towards Dristor 2	Line M1	Nicolae Grigorescu towards Republica
Mihai Bravu towards Preciziei	Line M3	Nicolae Grigorescu towards Anghel Saligny
Location

Dristor is a major metro station in Bucharest. It is located on the Bd. Camil Ressu – Șoseaua Mihai Bravu – Calea Dudești junction. The half of the station at the end of metro line 1 is called Dristor 2; the other half is Dristor 1, where trains of metro line M1/M3 pass through. Having two separately named parts of the station in one small space can cause confusion for people because both parts of the station have metro line M1 either passing through, which occurs at Dristor 1, or ending at Dristor 2. Signs guide passenger to either terminals.

Dristor 1 is where M3 service and through M1 service stops. It is lower in altitude than Dristor 2 and has one island platform.

Dristor 2 has one island platform too and is the terminus of line M1. A passageway at the south end of the platform connects it to Dristor 1.

The station was opened on 28 December 1981 as part of the section between Timpuri Noi and Republica. On 17 August 1989, the section between Dristor and Gara de Nord was opened.

== Incidents ==
On December 12 2017 at around 15:25 (3:25pm) EEST a 25 year old woman was pushed onto the subway tracks right when the train was arriving at the station by a 36 year old woman, the abusers friends say that she had mental problems. A bit of time before the crime she had also attempted to push a 20 year old into the tracks at station Costin Georgian
