= Nicolae Grigorescu metro station =

Bucharest metro station

Nicolae Grigorescu
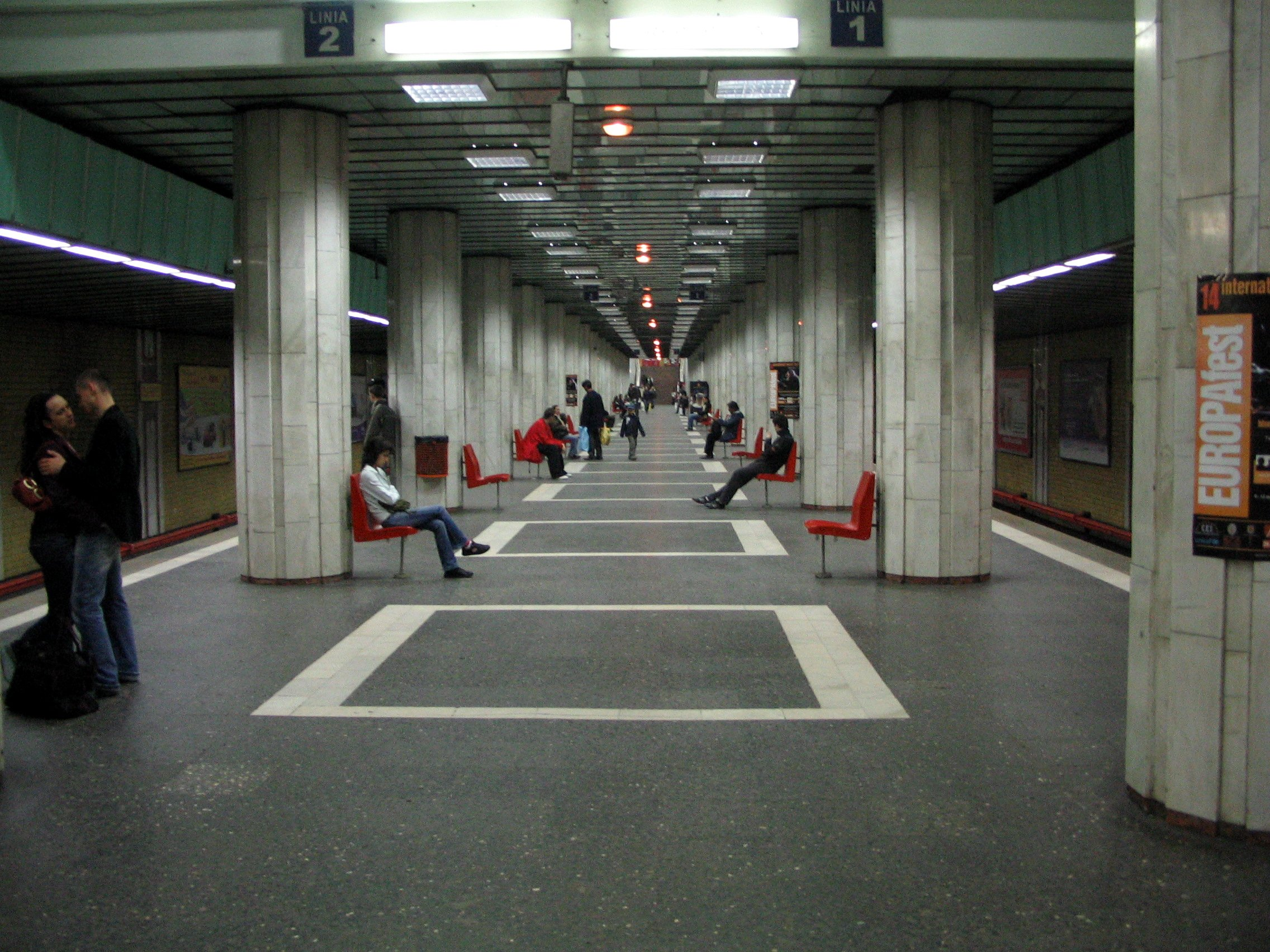

General information
- Location: Titan Square; Sector 3, Bucharest; Romania
- Coordinates: 44.41373°N 26.15846°E
- Platforms: 2 – One island, one side platform
- Tracks: 3
- Tram routes: None, due to the tram line modernization works.
- Bus routes: 102, 243, 619, 627

Construction
- Structure type: Underground

History
- Opened: 28 November 1981 (Nicolae Grigorescu 1); 20 November 2008 (Nicolae Grigorescu 2)

Services
Preceding station	Bucharest Metro	Following station
Dristor 1 towards Dristor 2	Line M1	Titan towards Republica
Dristor 1 towards Preciziei	Line M3	1 Decembrie 1918 towards Anghel Saligny
Location

Nicolae Grigorescu is a metro station in Bucharest. It is named after the Romanian painter Nicolae Grigorescu, and shares this name with the nearby boulevard, Bd. Nicolae Grigorescu. Before 1990, it was known as Leontin Sălăjan, after a Communist Army General.

The station was opened on 28 December 1981 as part of the second phase of Line 1 between Timpuri Noi and Republica. On 20 November 2008, the extension to Linia de Centură (now Anghel Saligny) was constructed, and a shuttle started operating between Nicolae Grigorescu and Anghel Saligny. The regular operation started on 4 July 2009.

== Extension ==
An extension to Line M1/M3 connects Nicolae Grigorescu to Anghel Saligny. The extension has been open since 20 November 2008.
