= Bolintin =

Bolintin may refer to several places in Romania:

- Bolintin-Vale, a town in Giurgiu County
- Bolintin-Deal, a commune in Giurgiu County
