= Bucharest Metro Line M3 =

Metro line in Bucharest, Romania

Line M3

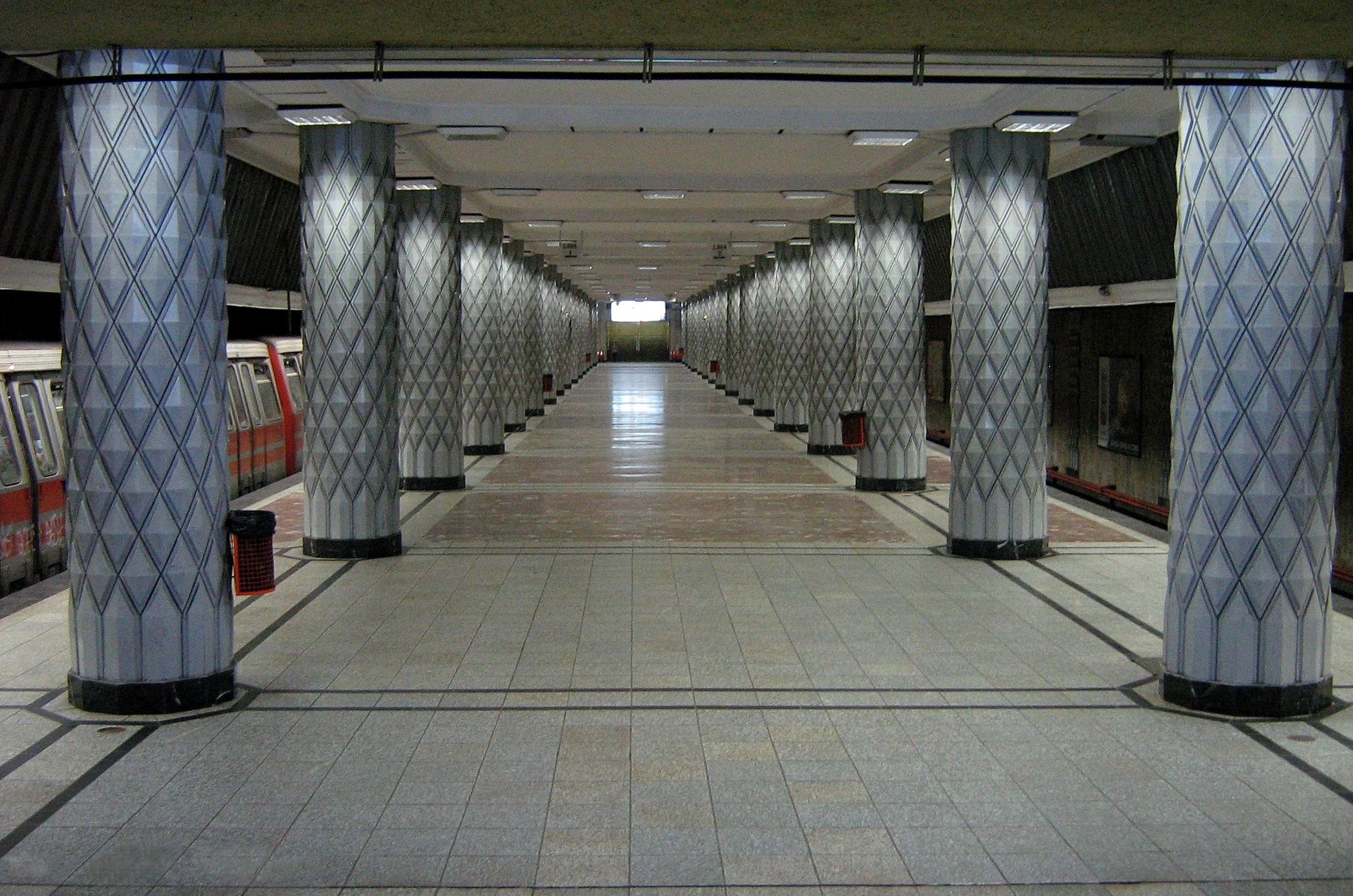
- Politehnica station

Overview
- Status: Operational
- Termini: Preciziei; Anghel Saligny
- Stations: 15

Service
- Type: Rapid transit
- System: Bucharest Metro
- Operator(s): Metrorex S.A.
- Depot(s): Militari (Industriilor)
- Rolling stock: BM1 (Astra IVA); BM2 (Bombardier)
- Ridership: 26949000 (2019)

History
- Opened: 19 August 1983; 42 years ago as a M1 branch
- Last extension: 2008

Technical
- Line length: 22.20 km (13.79 mi)
- Track gauge: 1,432 mm (4 ft 8 3/8 in)
- Electrification: 750 V DC third rail

M3 (22.2 km (13.8 mi)) is one of the five lines of the Bucharest Metro. M3 Line runs from Anghel Saligny to Preciziei. It is the east-west line of the system. The line shares 8.67 km (5.39 mi) and 7 stations with M1.

== History ==
The first part of the present-day M3 to be built was from Eroilor to Preciziei (at the time known as Industriilor) along with the line to Industriilor depot (nearby the ITB Militari depot), west of the station itself. This section was not a line on its own, but rather a branch of the M1, and it opened on 19 August 1983. During the communist period the 'M3' was the Gara de Nord - Dristor 2 section of what is today the M1. Construction work on another branch, from Nicolae Grigorescu to Anghel Saligny (at time named Leontin Sălăjan and Linia de Centură), began in 1988, but the work was halted in 1996 and the tunnels were flooded.

Due to the very large gap between Pacii and Lujerului (then known as Armata Poporului) construction of Gorjului started. It was opened in two stages: the westbound platform in 1994 and the eastbound platform in 1998.

In the mid 2000s the route of the M3 was shortened from Pantelimon - Industriilor to Eroilor - Industriilor and the M3 became a shuttle service, similar to the M4.

In 2008, the long-overdue section from Nicolae Grigorescu to Linia de Centură, for which construction works resumed in 2004, was finally opened, also as a shuttle, as an extension of the M4. Because a line composed of two unconnected shuttles was very impractical, on 4 July 2009 the two branches from Preciziei and Anghel Saligny were linked sharing tracks with the M1 between Eroilor and Nicolae Grigorescu and thus forming the M3 as it is operated today.

== Rolling stock ==
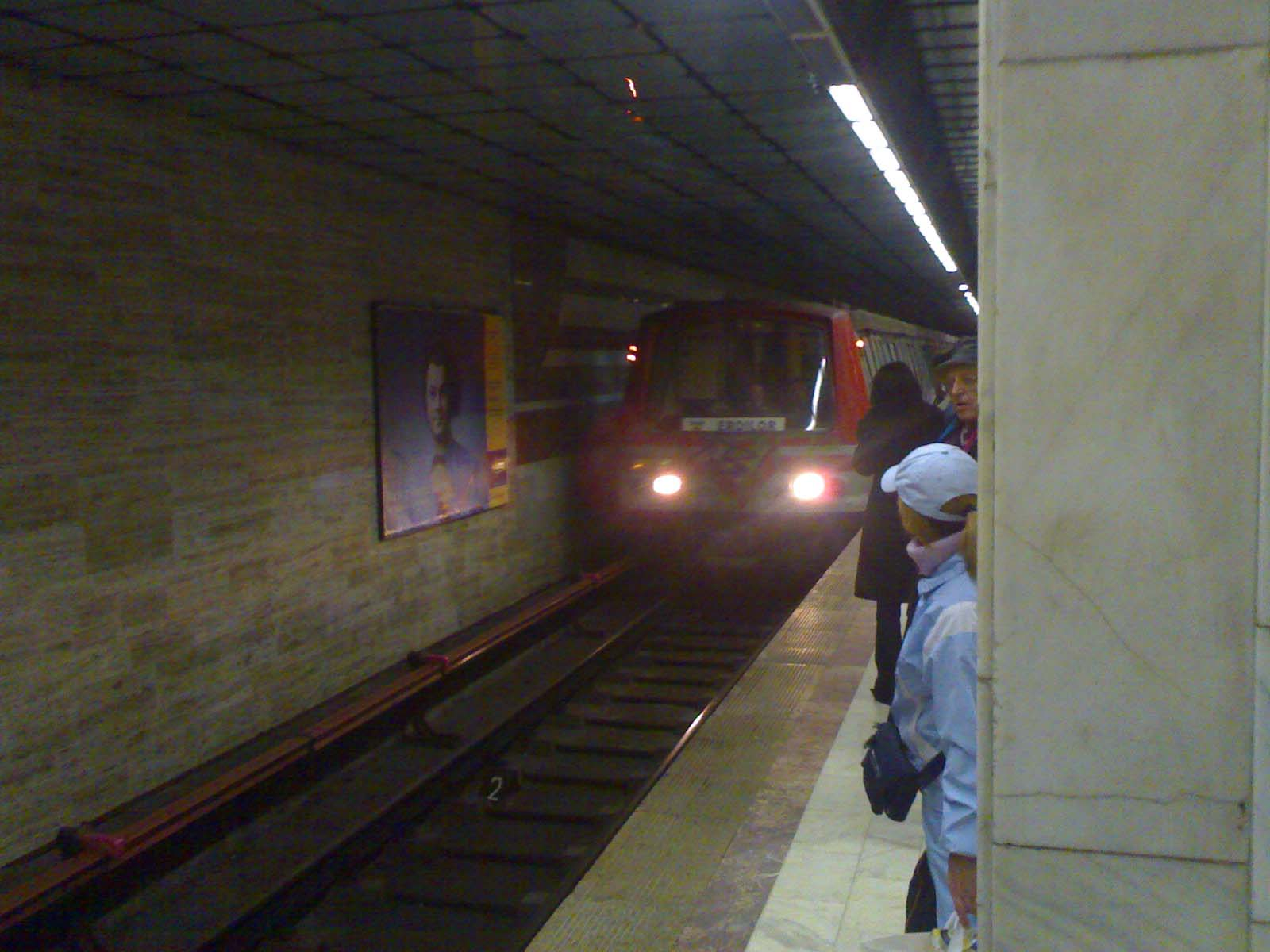
An old IVA train at Lujerului.

The M3 uses Astra IVA and Bombardier Movia trains. The IVA trains were used exclusively until 2009, when the first Movia trains were introduced on the M3, and services from Preciziei to Anghel Saligny commenced. In 2014, after the arrival of new CAF trains and the migration of Movia trains from the M2 to the M3 was complete, the old trains were no longer needed. IVA trains were reintroduced in 2020, when 8 Movia train sets were transferred to the new Line 5.

== Name changes ==
Station	Previous name(s)	Years
Preciziei	Industriilor	1983–2009
Lujerului	Armata Poporului	1983–2009
Nicolae Teclu	Policolor	2008–2009
Anghel Saligny	Linia de Centură	2008–2009

== Extensions ==
An extension from Păcii towards the A1 Motorway and the Western Industrial Park is planned for 2030.
