= Sector 3 (Bucharest) =

Bucharest, Sector 3 Sector 3, București
- Sector
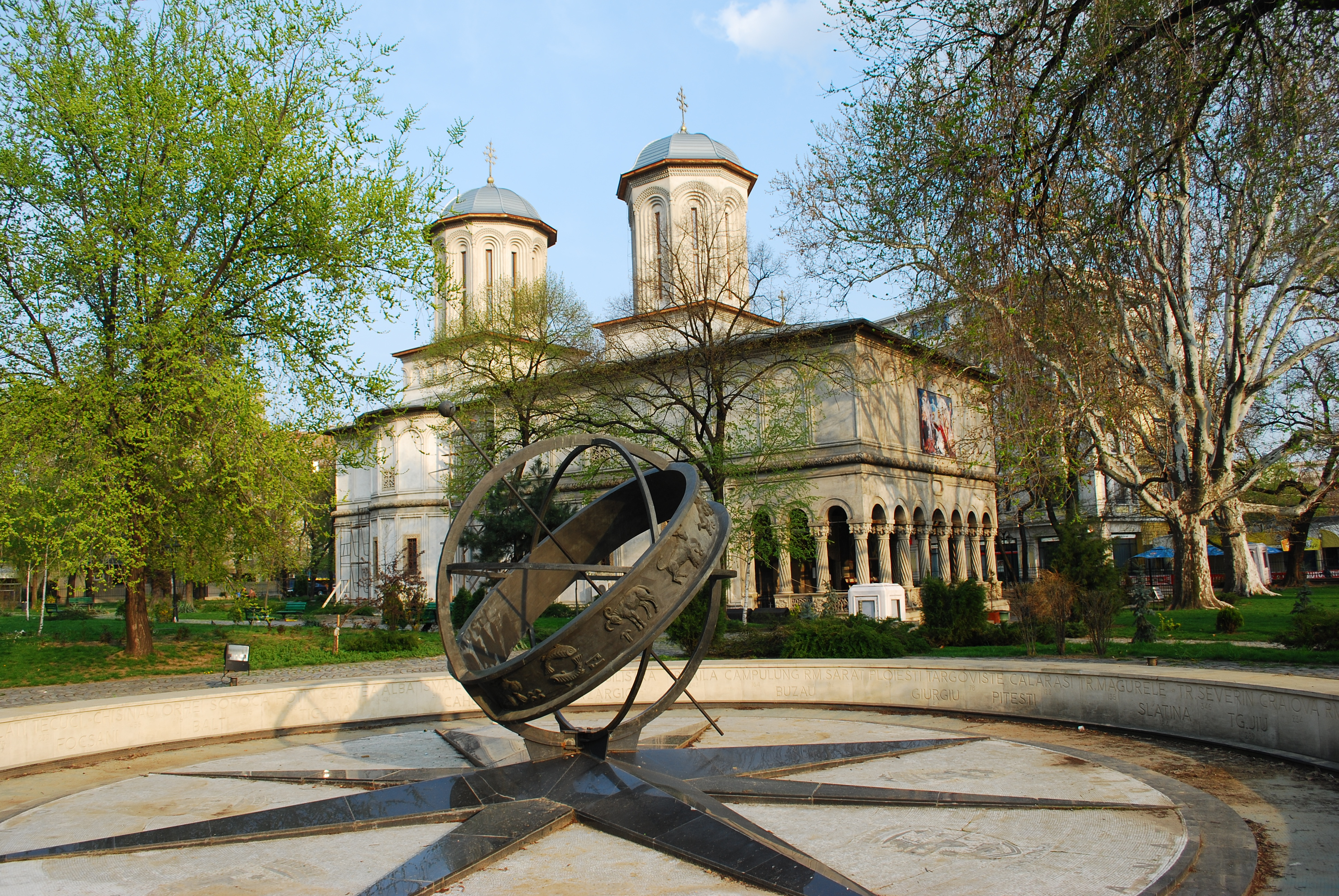
- New St. George Church and Kilometre Zero
- Interactive map of Bucharest, Sector 3
- Coordinates: 44°26′7″N 26°6′10″E
- Country: Romania
- County: Municipality of Bucharest

Government
  - Mayor: Robert Negoiță (Bucharest 2020)
  - Deputy-mayor: Elena Petrescu (ALDE)

Area
  - Total: 32 km^{2} (12 sq mi)
- Elevation: 60–90 m (200–300 ft)

Population (December 1, 2021)
  - Total: 373,566
  - Density: 11,673.9/km^{2} (30,235/sq mi)
- Time zone: UTC+2 (EET)
  - Summer (DST): UTC+3 (EEST)
- Postal Code: 03xxxx
- Area code: +40 x1
- Car Plates: B
- Website: www.primarie3.ro

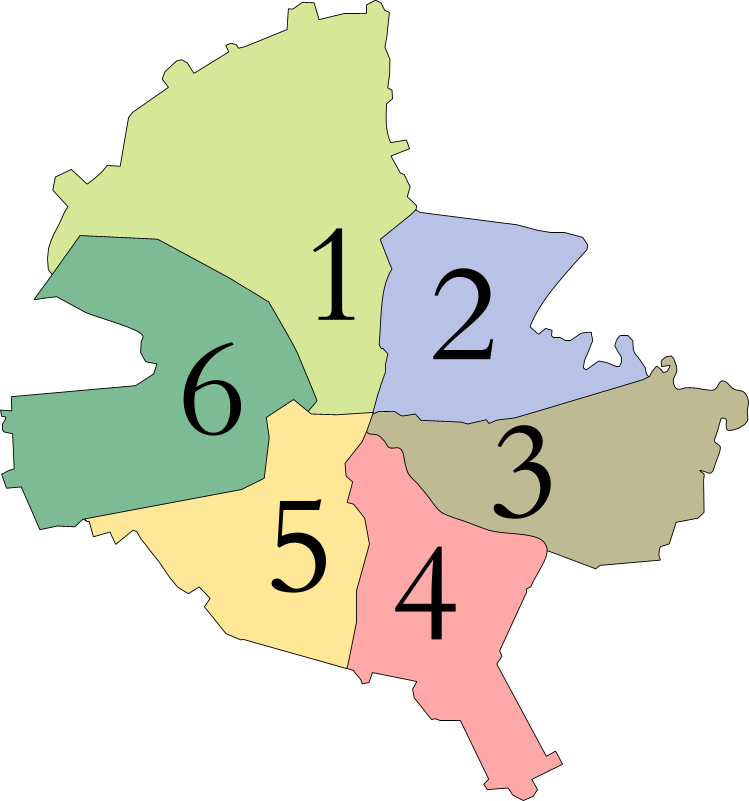
The six sectors of Bucharest

Sector 3 (Romanian: Sectorul 3) is an administrative unit of Bucharest. It is the most populous, most densely populated and also the third-largest division of the city. With a total population of over 460 thousand, it is currently the second-most populated administrative area of Romania, only after the capital city. It is also the most important of all six sectors of Bucharest, as it includes the Downtown Bucharest, the Kilometre Zero and other significant landmarks. It is bordered by Sector 2 to the North, Ilfov County to the East, Sector 4 to the South, Sector 5 to the Southwest, and Sector 1 to the Northwest.

The largest and most populous district of Sector 3 is Titan. Lipscani, colloquially known as oldtown is the center of the nightlife in Bucharest, and also the biggest attraction for foreign tourists. Also notable, the Bucharest Mall is located inside the Vitan district of Sector 3. Two of the sector's districts have been described as the most pleasant by Bucharest citizens.

== Districts ==
- Downtown
- Old City
- Dristor
- Dudești
- Văcărești
- Titan
- Vitan

== Transportation ==
Sector 3, being the largest division of Bucharest is served by the largest part of its public transport company. The sector is served by over 50 bus lines and 18 trolleybus lines. The sector is also served by a wide light rail system.

Trolleybus routes 70 and 92 as well as tram routes 40 and 56 are the only routes operating exclusively inside the sector.

The sector is also served by the Bucharest Metro. A total of 13 stations are placed within its districts. The oldest and busiest station of the system is Union Square, while the newest one is Policolor. Other major underground hubs located in Sector 3 include Dristor, Titan and University.

The Sun Motorway which links the city to Constanța also starts from this sector. There is also a CFR train station located in the sector, the commuter station Titan Sud.

== Education ==
The sector is home to more than fifty kindergartens, school and public high schools as well as the Hyperion Private University. The most prestigious high schools in the sector are the Matei Basarab National College, situated in Downtown Bucharest and the Alexandru Ioan Cuza Theoretical High School, situated in Titan.

== Politics ==
Robert Negoiță, a member of the Social Democratic Party (PSD), has been the sector's mayor since 2012. He is currently serving his fourth term, having been re-elected in 2016, 2020, and 2024. The Local Council of Sector 3 has 31 seats, with the following party composition (as of 2024):

Party	Seats	Current Council
Social Democratic Party (PSD)	10	
Save Romania Union (USR)	7	
National Liberal Party (PNL)	4	
Alliance for the Union of Romanians (AUR)	3	
People's Movement Party (PMP)	3	
Renewing Romania's European Project (REPER)	2	
Force of the Right (FD)	1	
SENS	1	

== Demographics ==
With a population of 385,439 people as of the 2011 census, Sector 3 is the most populous sector in Bucharest. According to the 2002 census, 97.29% of the sector's population were Romanians, while 1.31% were Romani, 0.29% Hungarians, and 0.15% Turks; in terms of gender, 53.6% of the population was female, while 46.4% was male.

== See also ==
- Apartment Building 63
