= Preciziei metro station =

Bucharest metro station

Coordinates: 44°25′49.5″N 25°59′24″E

Preciziei
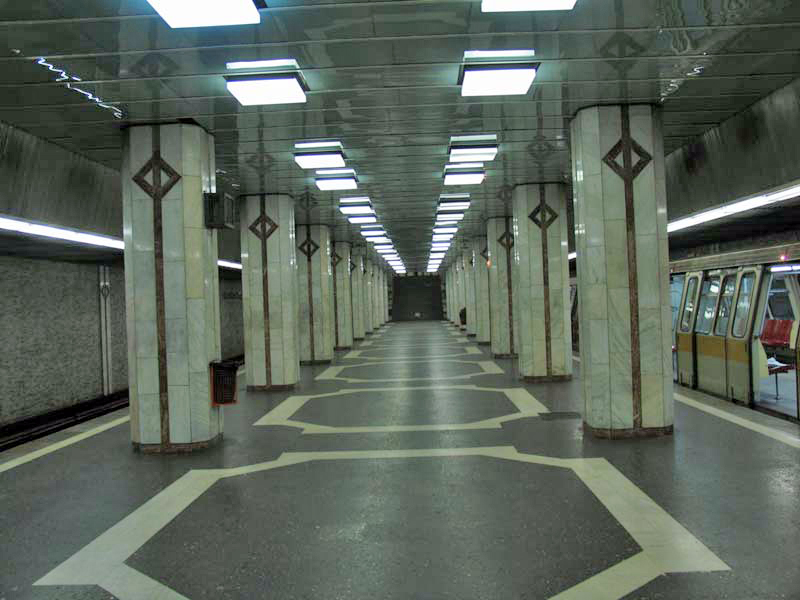
- Metro station in 2009

General information
- Location: Preciziei Avenue, Militari; Sector 6, Bucharest; Romania
- Platforms: One island platform
- Tracks: 2
- Tram routes: 25

Construction
- Structure type: Underground

History
- Opened: 19 August 1983

Services
Preceding station	Bucharest Metro	Following station
Terminus	Line M3	Păcii towards Anghel Saligny
Location

Preciziei (eng. [of the] precision), formerly known as Industriilor is a terminus metro station in Bucharest. It is situated in the industrial park in the west of the city. Industrial facilities directly served by the metro station: Coca-Cola factory, Urbis. Other industrial facilities in the park can be reached by tram. The station is located on the Preciziei Avenue. This is the last stop on the M3 Line connecting Preciziei to Anghel Saligny.

The station was opened in August 1983 as part of the extension from Politehnica.
