= Anghel Saligny metro station =

Bucharest metro station

Coordinates: 44°24′20″N 26°12′30″E

M3 Anghel Saligny
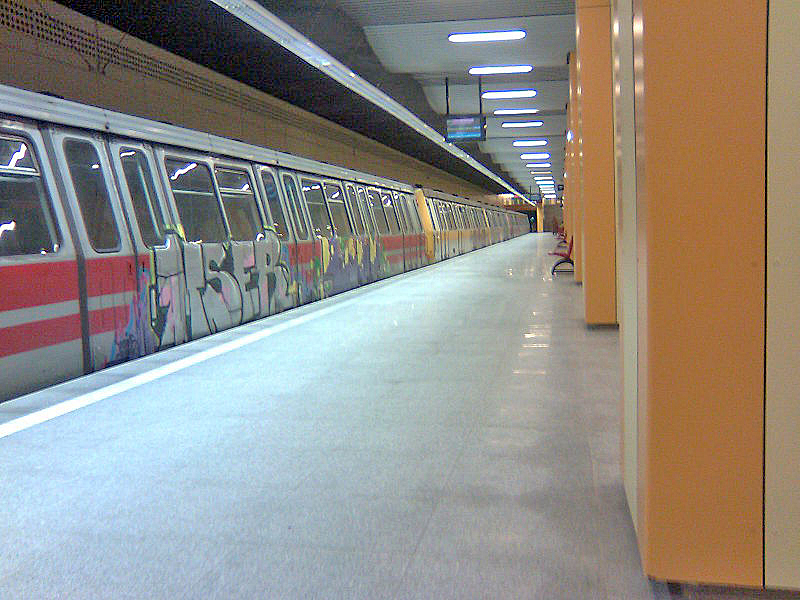

General information
- Location: Bucharest outskirts; close to A2 motorway and Bucharest Ringroad (Linia de Centura); Sector 3, Bucharest; Romania
- Platforms: 1 island platform
- Tracks: 2
- Bus routes: 246, 405, 408, 472

Construction
- Structure type: Underground
- Accessible: Yes

History
- Opened: 20 November 2008
- Former names: Linia de Centură (2008-2009)

Services
Preceding station	Bucharest Metro	Following station
Nicolae Teclu towards Preciziei	Line M3	Terminus
Location

Anghel Saligny, known for a short time as Linia de Centură ("Ring Road"), is a metro station in southeastern Bucharest on Line M3. It is the final stop of the Preciziei – Anghel Saligny M3 extension. It was opened on 20 November 2008 as part of the extension from Nicolae Grigorescu, which initially operated as a shuttle. The regular operation started on 4 July 2009.

Originally planned to serve the large industrial estates in the area and replace the obsolete surface tram line, now it serves suburban commuters and students.
