= Danny Huwé =

Belgian journalist

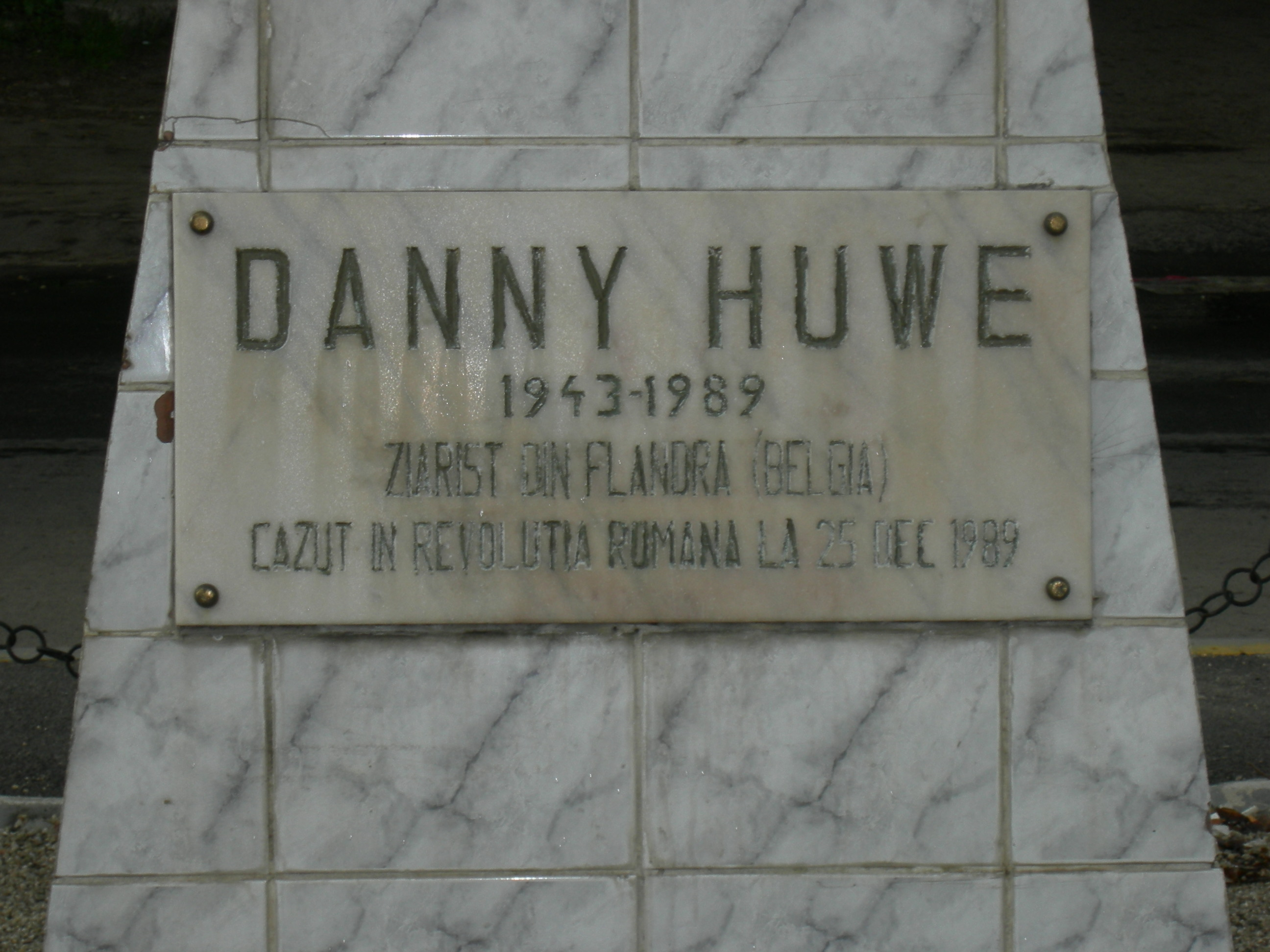
Memorial for Danny Huwé at the Răzoare traffic circle, Drumul Taberei, Romania, to commemorate his role in the Romanian Revolution.

Danny Huwé (1 December 1943 – c. 24 December 1989) was a Belgian journalist who was working for VTM, Vlaamse Televisie Maatschappij (English: Flemish Television Company), at the time of his death. Before VTM he worked as a radio journalist at the BRT (national radio and television) for many years together with journalists such as Rudi Dufour, Rudi Vranckx, Mark Ooms, and Piet Deslé. He was killed during the Romanian Revolution.

== Biography ==
He was born in Geraardsbergen (Belgium), and killed on 24 or 25 December 1989 in Bucharest (Romania) during the Romanian Revolution. He was shot by a sniper thought to be loyal to Nicolae Ceaușescu. Huwé was travelling by car from Sofia, Bulgaria towards central Bucharest. His car was in the southwestern part of the city, in the Drumul Taberei neighborhood, when it was blocked by a tank. Border guards opened fire, hitting him in the head.

== Legacy ==
The square where Huwé was killed has been named after him. The Danny Huwé Square (Piața Danny Huwé in Romanian) is located at the Răzoare traffic circle which is at the intersection of Timișoara Boulevard, Drumul Taberei Boulevard, and Progresului Street. Also, the bus stations in the area bear his name.

Huwé had one son, Tim, who was 18 years old at the time of his father’s death.
