= Geerard Adriaen =

Belgian journalist and documentary filmmaker

Geerard Adriaen (Bruges, 30 May 2000) is a Belgian journalist, documentary filmmaker and television presenter. He has worked for both Belgian and Pakistani television and made documentaries in Africa. In 2025 he became a headman in a South African amaNdebele kingdom.

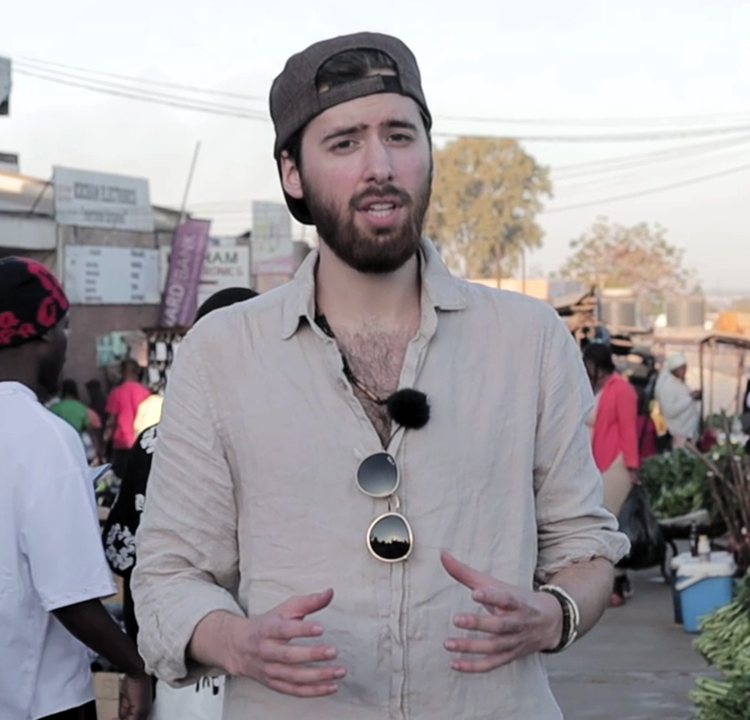
Belgian reporter Geerard Adriaen

== Activities ==
Adriaen studied Journalism at Artevelde University of Applied Sciences in Ghent, Belgium. During his studies he did an internship at the Belgian public broadcaster VRT in Brussels, in the editorial team of war correspondent Rudi Vranckx. He also wrote for VRT NWS on geopolitical affairs. An article he wrote on plans for a coup d'état in Belarus went viral internationally and was picked up by various media outlets, including Politico.

In May and June 2024, he made a documentary in Sierra Leone for the VRT CANVAS programme Nomaden, on the synthetic drug kush. After negotiating with local drug dealers, he gained access to several gangs, which he could film. He spent a month living in a slum in Freetown and suffered a hand injury during a machete attack on the eve of his 24th birthday. His documentary Lost in Smoke raised donations that saved 29 kush addicts. Among the donors was the Belgian Princess Pauline de Merode.

In June and July 2025, Adriaen filmed the documentary Men with Glasses in Zimbabwe for VRT CANVAS, about eye problems among people with albinism. For making this documentary, he was assisted by Princess Kelelo Dlamini of Swaziland, with whom he lived together for several weeks. Together with the Belgian organisation Eyes for the World, they organised the project Eyes for Zimbabwe, through which over a thousand visually impaired people received free glasses from Eyes of the World. Due to the lack of press freedom in the country, Adriaen filmed undercover. He posed as a volunteer videographer for Eyes for the World's social media, rather than as a journalist for television. Nevertheless, he was monitored by the Zimbabwean police and security personnel from the ruling Zanu-PF party.

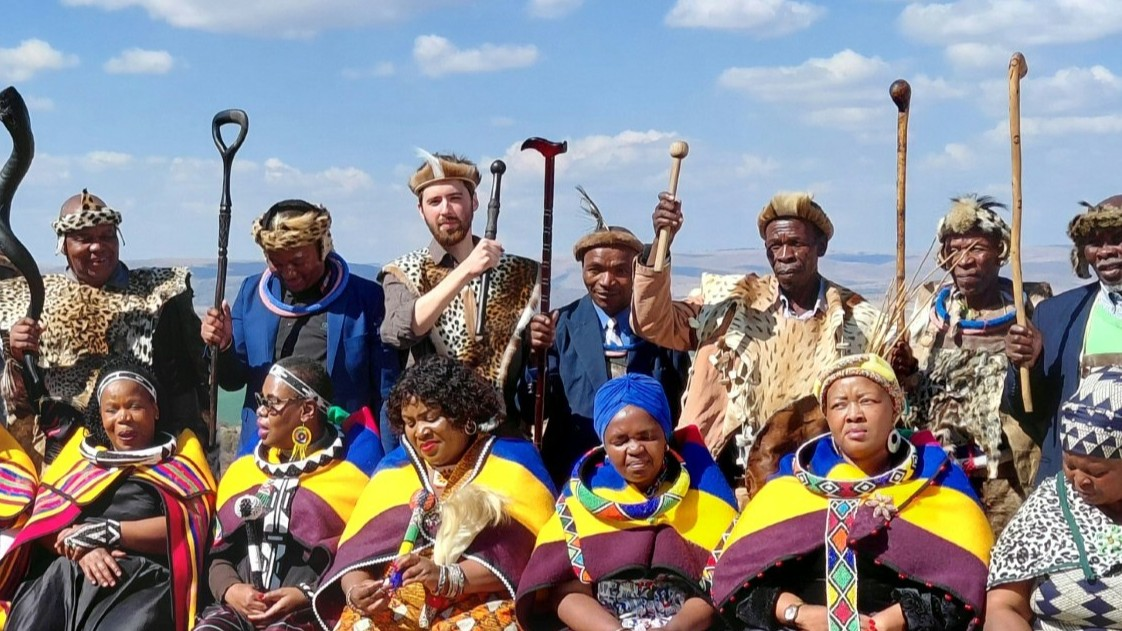
Geerard Adriaen during his initiation ceremony as headman in Mpumalanga, South Africa (July 2025)

After the recordings, Adriaen and Princess Dlamini were invited to South Africa by King Ndzundza Kamusi II, one of the three kings of the 2.1 million amaNdebele people. The king expressed his appreciation for the tangible impact Adriaen's journalism has had on African communities. Ndzundza Kamusi II organised a ceremony on 26 July 2025, where he appointed Adriaen as iNduna (headman), a noble title within the traditional structure surrounding the royal house. Adriaen initially wanted to refuse the title, fearing controversy. As a headman, Adriaen advises the king on media and humanitarian initiatives, and he can represent the king abroad. The ceremony was attended by several African monarchs. Adriaen was offered a polygamous marriage with two princesses, which he declined. VTM Nieuws made a TV-report on Adriaen's appointment.

Adriaen in the studio of Express24/7 in Karachi, Pakistan. (August 2026)

In April 2026, he moved to Pakistan, during the Afghanistan-Pakistan war. Pakistani billionaire and owner of Express Media Sultan Ali Lakhani had offered him a job as news presenter and host of a geopolitical talk show, on his television channel Express24/7 in Karachi. Adriaen wanted to work as a journalist in Pakistan to gain experience in a country where press freedom is under severe pressure. He also worked behind the scenes at Express24/7, including as a production coordinator of an AI-driven current affairs programme. In addition to his television work, he wrote for The Express Tribune, the Pakistani partner of The New York Times. Adriaen lived in a guest villa of Sultan Lakhani and had armed security around the clock, as Karachi was one of the most dangerous and least liveable cities in the world at that time. Journalists from Express Media are also targetted by terrorist organisations in the country, particularly by the Pakistani Taliban.
