= Sector 6 (Bucharest) =

Bucharest, Sector 6 Sector 6, București
- Sector
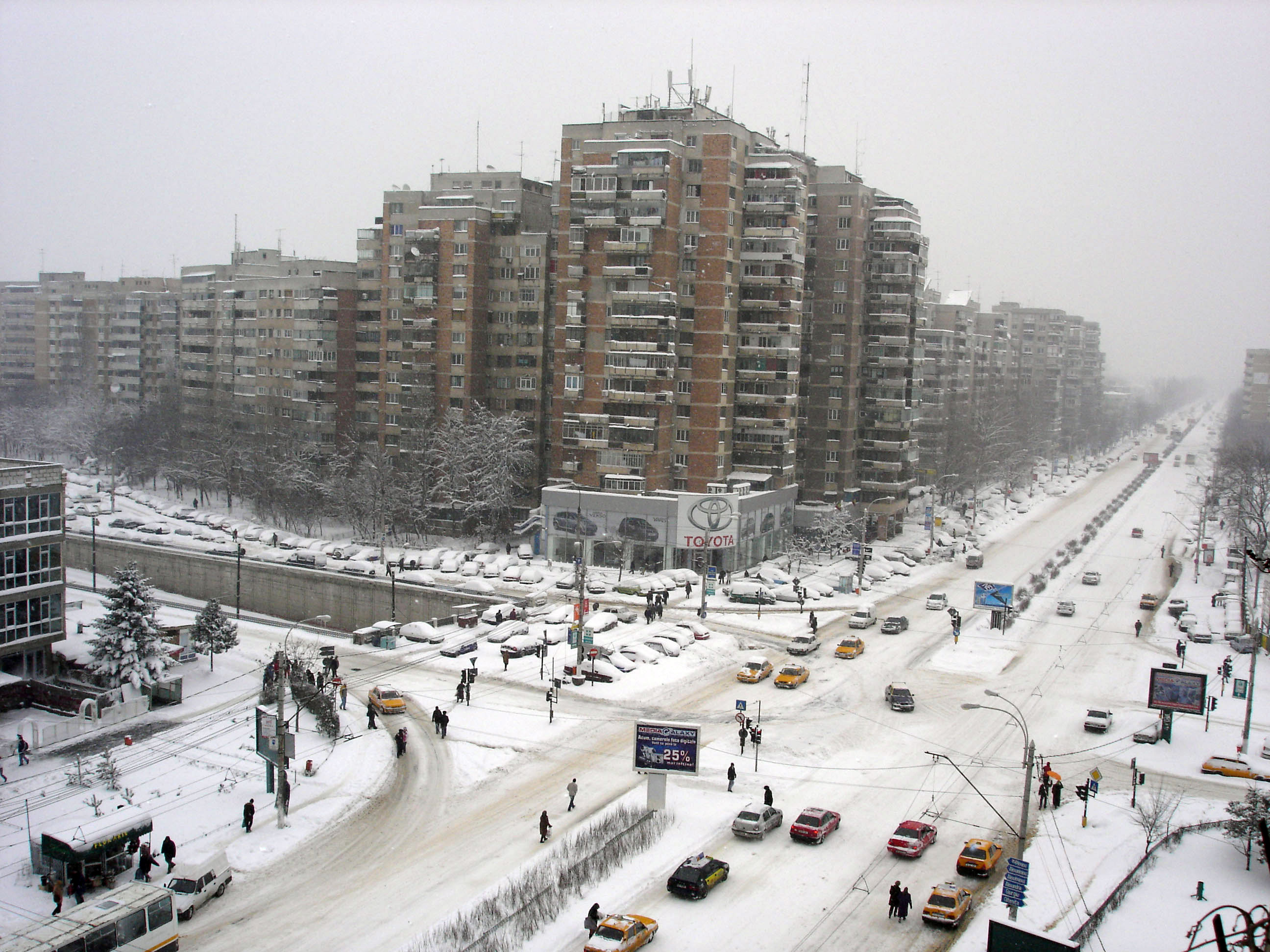
- Lujerului square in Militari
- Interactive map of Bucharest, Sector 6
- Coordinates: 44°26′46.6″N 26°03′57.8″E
- Country: Romania
- County: Municipality of Bucharest

Government
  - Mayor: Ciprian Ciucu (PNL)

Area
  - Total: 38 km^{2} (15 sq mi)
- Elevation: 60–90 m (200–300 ft)

Population (December 1, 2021)
  - Total: 325,759
  - Density: 8,572.6/km^{2} (22,203/sq mi)
- Time zone: UTC+2 (EET)
  - Summer (DST): UTC+3 (EEST)
- Postal Code: 06xxxx
- Area code: +40 x1
- Car Plates: B
- Website: www.primarie6.ro

Sector 6 (Romanian: Sectorul 6) is an administrative unit of Bucharest.

== Quarters ==
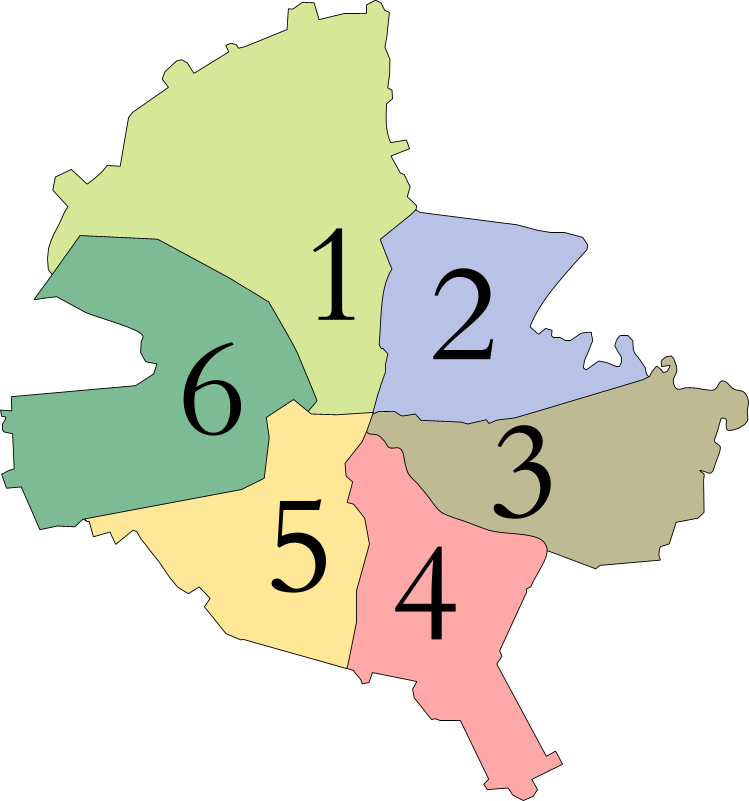
The six sectors of Bucharest

- Crângași
- Drumul Taberei
- Ghencea
- Giulești
- Militari
- Regie

== Politics ==
The sector's mayor is Ciprian Ciucu, from the National Liberal Party, having been elected for a four-year term in 2020. The Local Council of Sector 6 has 27 seats, with the following party composition (as of 2020):

Party	Seats	Current Council
Social Democratic Party (PSD)	9	
National Liberal Party (PNL)	8	
Save Romania Union (USR)	8	
People's Movement Party (PMP)	2	

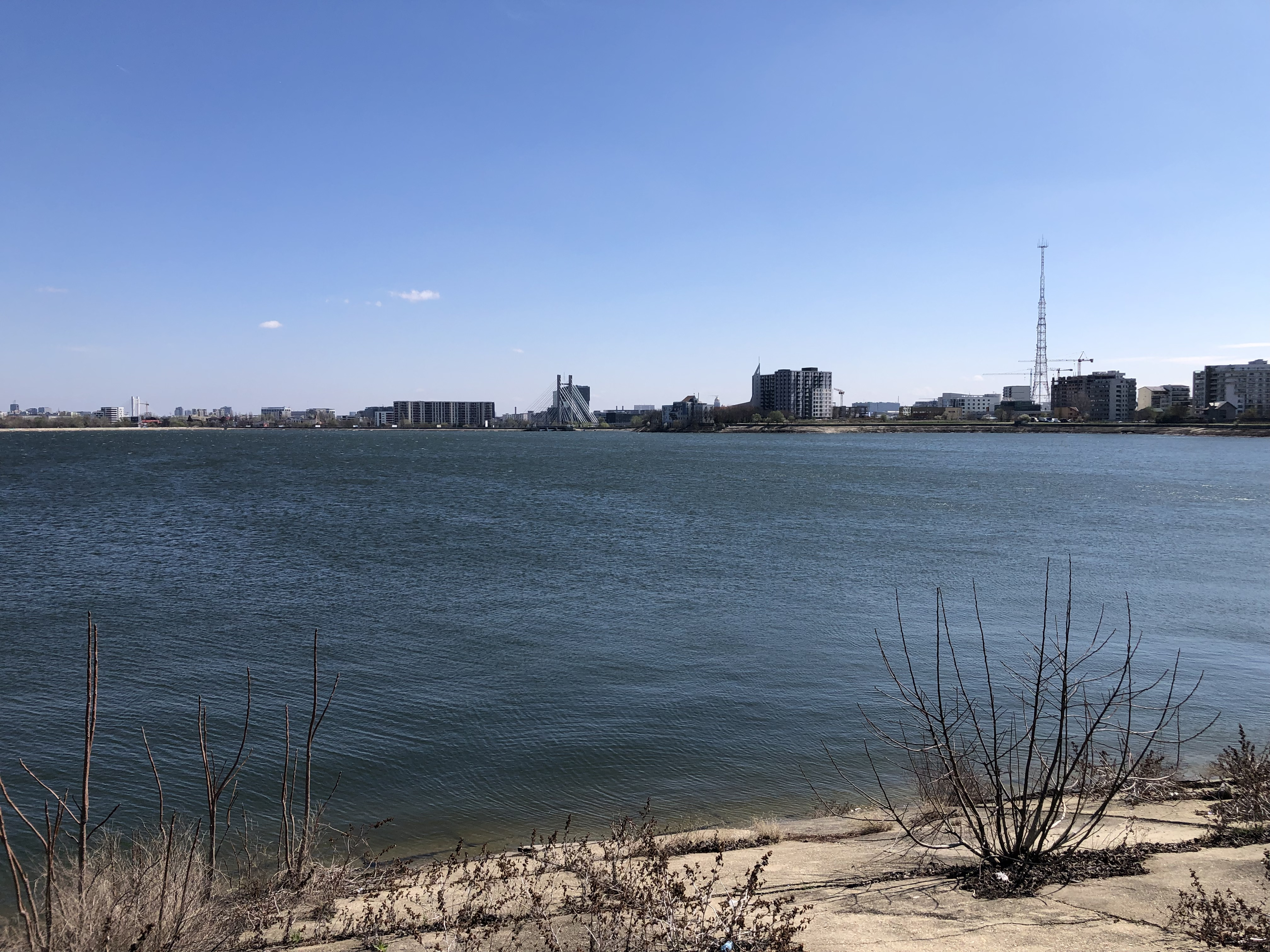
Lacul Morii, in Crângași

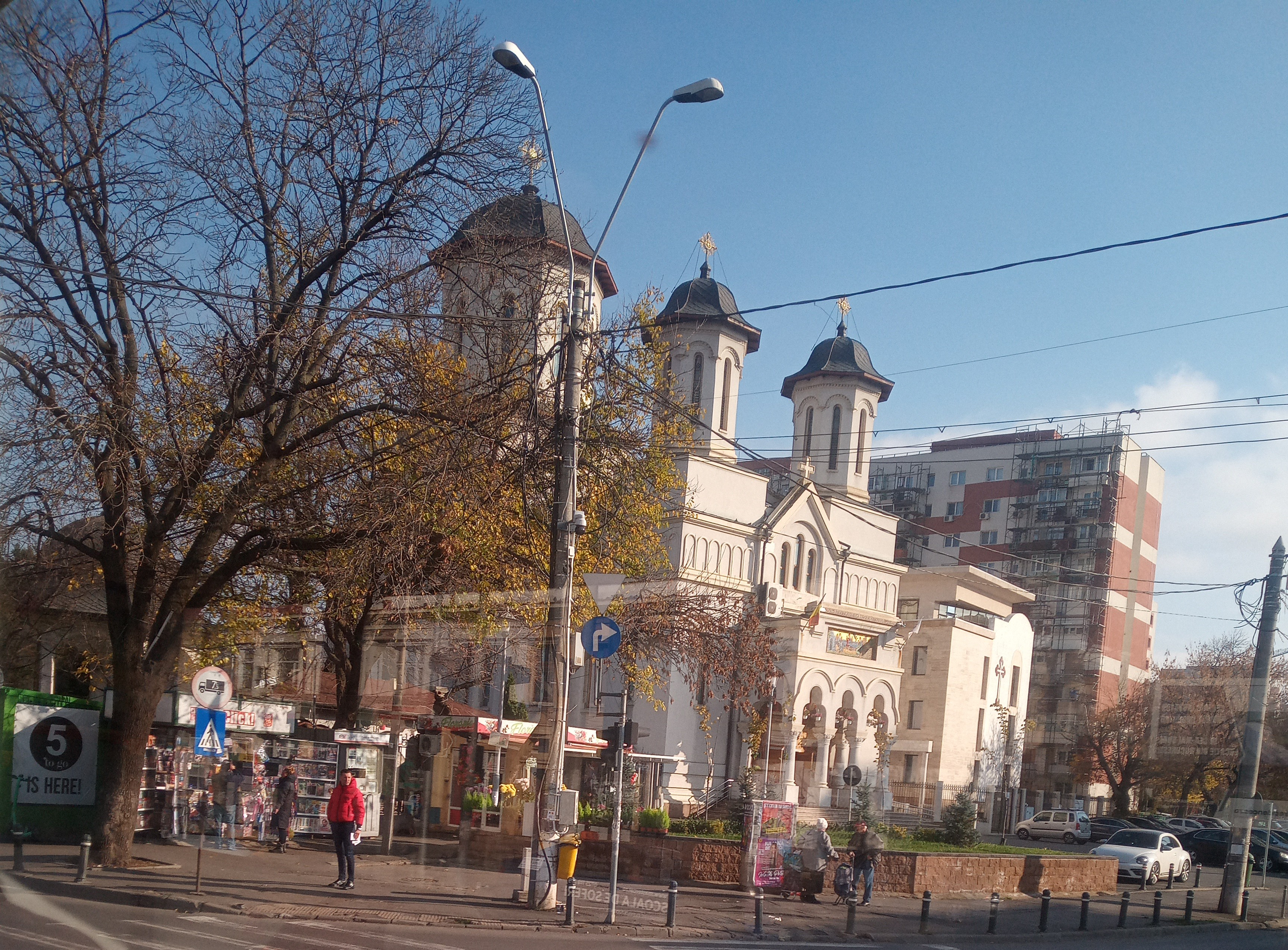
Holy Trinity Church, in Ghencea
