= Crângași =

Neighborhood in Bucharest, Romania

Coordinates: 44°27′37.16″N 26°4′14.29″E

Crângași on the map of Bucharest

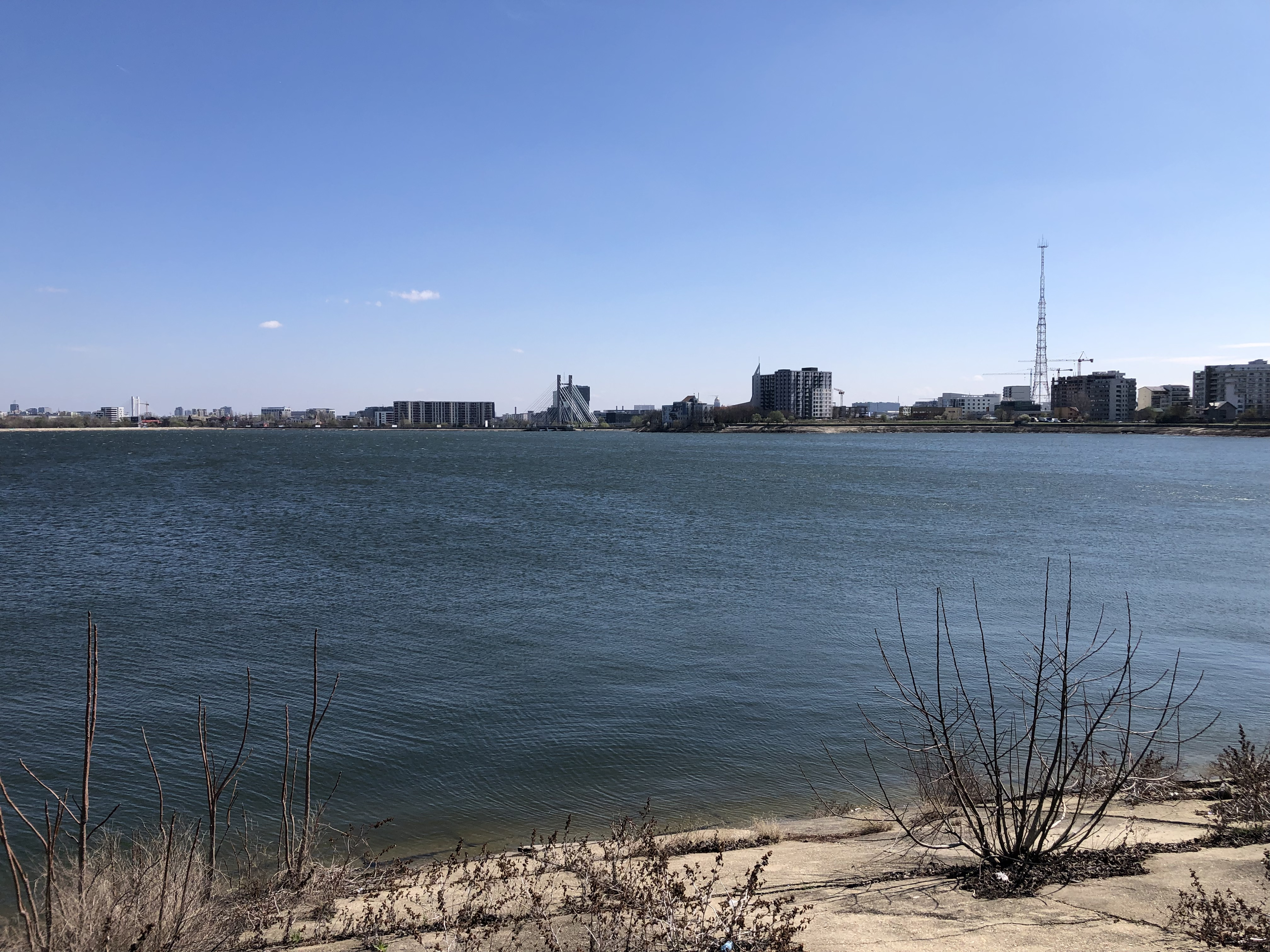
Lacul Morii in Crângași

Crângași is one of the smallest neighborhoods in the 6th Sector of Bucharest, Romania. It is situated on the west side of the city near the Dâmbovița River, where it flows into Lacul Morii. Its name means "people living in a young forest". Nearby neighborhoods include Giulești and Militari.

== History ==
Coins from the 4th century during the reign of Valentinian I and a furnace for making clay pots were discovered in the area. A map in 1835 displays a small village with only five houses called Crângași between Bucharest, the Dâmbovița River, and Marele Voievod commune. In 1922, a part of the village was integrated in Bucharest. Between 1940 and 1960 the area was inhabited by poor people which built houses near the river. In the early 60s, communist style apartment blocks were built in the area, initially known as the Constructorilor housing estate. It later continued in the mid to late 1980s with 8 to 10 storey apartment blocks. Due to the rise of the Dâmbovița River, the area was frequently flooded. The problem was solved in 1986 when Lacul Morii was built. At the end of the 1990s, a mosque was built in the neighborhood – the Ar-Rahman Mosque – located at 50-52 Munții Gurghiului Street. The initiative to construct this religious building came from a committee of the Semiluna Cultural Society, led by Dr. Ahmed Mazhar Nakechbandi. Today, the mosque is active, staffed by imams educated in Cairo, and is open daily for all Muslim prayer times.

== Commercial area ==
Piața Crângași is a flea market in the center of the neighborhood which sells anything from fruits and cereals to shoes and electronics. In 2005 the Grant Shopping Center was opened on Virtuții street, near the Crângași metro station. The shopping complex hosts 50 stores, a beauty saloon, and a coffee shop.

== Recreation ==
The main attraction of the area is Lacul Morii and the nearby park. During summer a swimming pool and a beach is opened in the south west part of the neighborhood. The Crângași Park has an outdoor stage where free plays are held during summer. There is also an artificial panel for climbing inside Grant Metal on Constructorilor boulevard.

== Transport ==
- Tram: 41
- Trolleybus: 90
- Buses: 162, 163, 178
- Metro: Crângași metro station
