= Drumul Taberei Park =

Park in Bucharest, Romania

- Parcul Drumul Taberei
- Interactive map of Drumul Taberei Park
- Location: Bucharest, Romania
- Coordinates: 44.42°N 26.03°E

Drumul Taberei Park (Romanian: Parcul Drumul Taberei) is a park in Sector 6 in Bucharest, Romania, being the largest park in the Drumul Taberei neighborhood.

== History ==
For more information, see: Drumul Taberei

The origin of the park is closely linked to the history of the neighborhood in whose geographical center it is located. It was laid out around the 1960s, with the design and construction of the first areas of the future Drumul Taberei, being designated as the main green space within it and serving a population of 60,000 people. It was named "Alexandru Moghioroș Park" during the communist era, after the former Romanian Deputy Prime Minister, Alexandru Moghioroș in the government of Chivu Stoica.

== Park redevelopment ==
Work on Drumul Taberei Park began in May 2013, reopening to the public on May 30, 2015, and the greenhouses took a few more months to officially open. The work on the greenhouse with seven pavilions, each with a specific climate, organized as follows: tropical climate, Mediterranean climate, cactus desert, succulent plants and an equatorial area, was completed in October 2019.
