= Lake Dâmbovița =

Lake in Bucharest, Romania

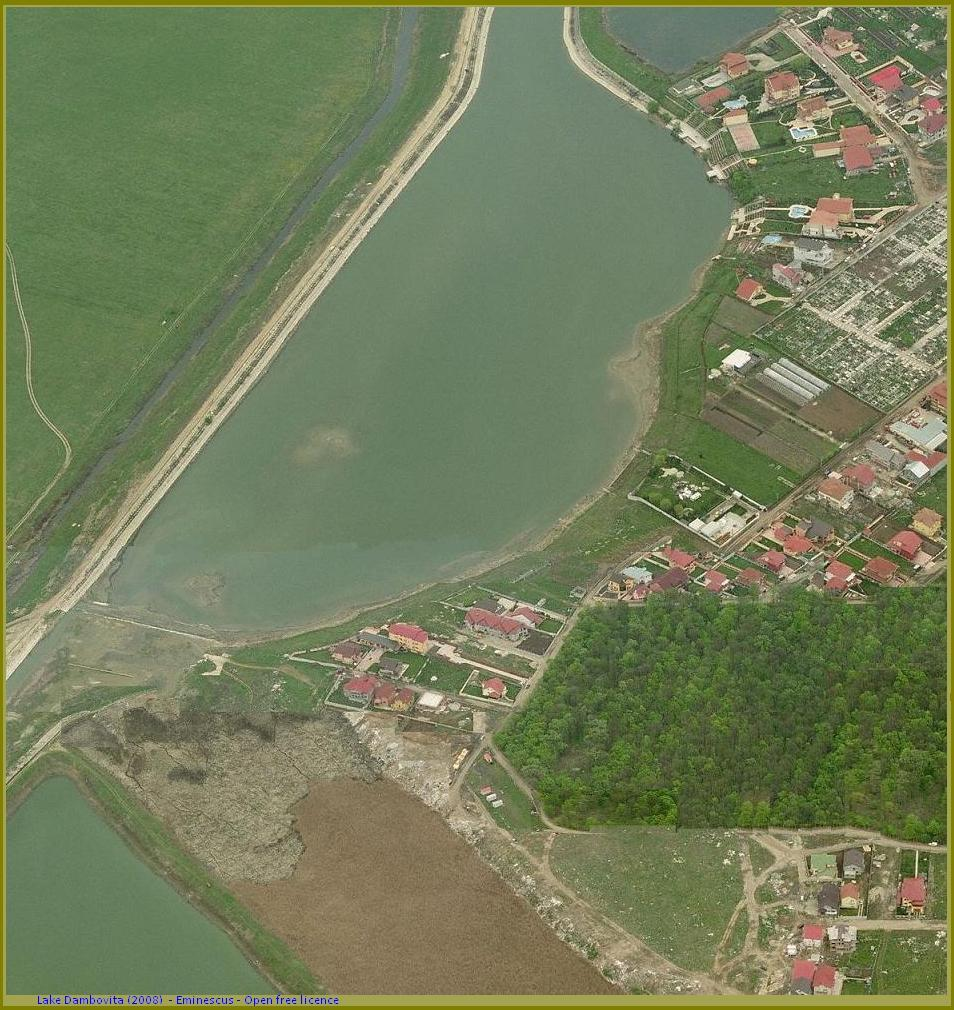
- Dâmbovița Lake Aerial

- Location within Romania
- Location: Bucharest, Romania
- Group: Bucharest Lakes
- Coordinates: 44.458321°N 26.006849°E
- Basin countries: Romania
- Max. length: 0.2 km (0.12 mi)
- Max. width: 0.4 km (0.25 mi)
- Surface area: 0.55 km^{2} (0.21 sq mi)
- Average depth: 3 m (9.8 ft)
- Max. depth: 4 m (13 ft)
- Water volume: 3 km^{3} (0.72 cu mi)
- Shore length^{1}: 1 km (0.62 mi)
- Surface elevation: 78 m (256 ft)
- Settlements: Bucharest
- ^{1} Shore length is not a well-defined measure.

Dâmbovița Lake ("Lacul Dâmbovița") is a lake situated on Dâmbovița River in Bucharest and Chiajna, west of Morii Lake and bordering that lake. It has an area of 55 ha (140 acres). The lake is 3 km (1.9 mi) from the center of Bucharest (University Square) and is located between Morii Lake to the east, Giulești district to the north, Chiajna commune and Roșu Forest to the south.

A projected underground highway entails a tunnel which will link Morii Lake, Dâmbovița Lake, and Chiajna to Centrul Civic, Unirii Square, and the A1 motorway.
