= Ghencea =

Coordinates: 44°24′N 26°00′E

Ghencea on the map of Bucharest

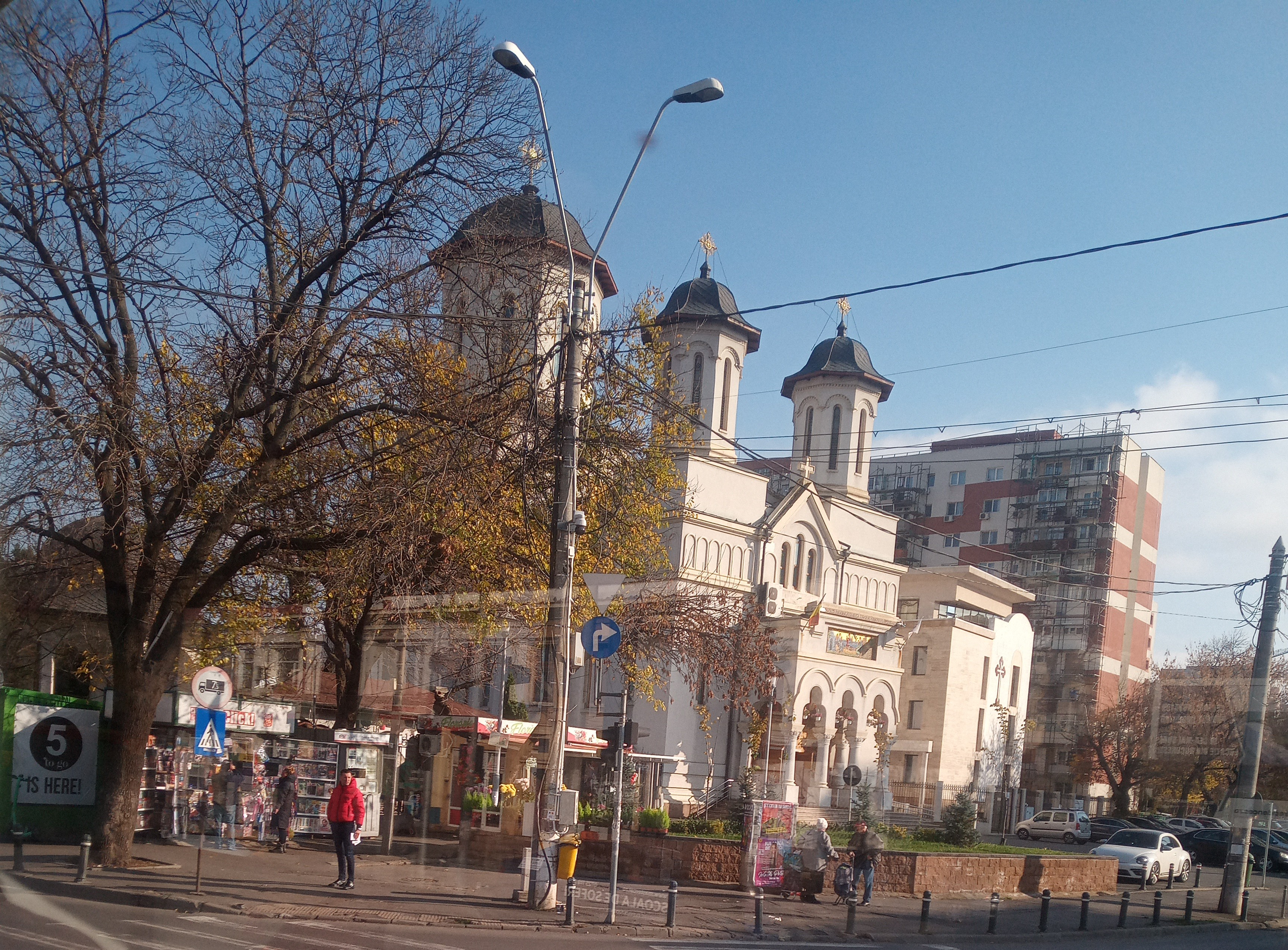
Holy Trinity Church – Ghencea

Ghencea is a district of the Romanian capital city Bucharest, split between Sector 5 and Sector 6. It is home to the famous sports club CSA Steaua București. Nearby districts are Drumul Taberei and Rahova.

== History ==
Construction of apartment blocks started in the area in 1978 and was completed in 1987. The textile factory Tricodava and the plastics factory Munplast were built by the communist regime in the neighborhood. Tricodava was demolished in 2007, and an apartment complex was built on the former location.

== Transportation ==
The infrastructure of the neighborhood is not very good. There are no subway stations in the area, and the only way to get around fast is by using lightrail line 41. Getting around by car, bus, or trolleybus can be very time-consuming, especially during rush hours.

== Living ==
There are no markets in the area, but in the morning, people come from the nearby village of Domnești and sell fruits and vegetables on the street. There is a Billa supermarket that serves the area; the store was turned into a Carrefour market in 2015.

== Notable landmarks ==
- Stadionul Steaua, home stadium of Steaua București
- Ghencea Cemetery
- Ghencea Holy Trinity Church
