= Wateler Peace Prize =

Dutch award for peace advocacy

The Carnegie Wateler Peace Prize is a biennial award presented by the Carnegie Foundation to individuals or institutions that have made an outstanding contribution to the promotion of peace through words, actions, or writings. The Wateler Peace Prize has been awarded at the Peace Palace since 1931 and is the second oldest permanent peace prize after the Nobel Peace Prize.

== History ==
On 16 November 1916, during the horrors of World War I, Johan Gerard Daniel Wateler, a banker from The Hague, decided to dedicate his fortune to the cause of peace. In his will, he stipulated that his wealth should be used to create a peace prize. Inspired by Alfred Nobel, he envisioned a recurring award to promote peace. Wateler initially wanted the Dutch government to present the prize, but the De Geer I Cabinet at the time found this inappropriate. Wateler had already taken this possibility into account in his will: if the State declined the inheritance, the funds would be transferred to the Carnegie Foundation.

After Wateler's death in 1927, his estate went to the Carnegie Foundation who was assigned to regularly award the peace prize with the interest of the legate. The Wateler Peace Prize was first awarded in 1931 as an annual award with an interruption during and shortly after World War II. In the early years, the prizes were sent by mail without any formal ceremony. It was not until the 1970s that the award took its current form—a certificate bearing the motto "Pacis palmae digniores quam tropaea belli" ("The Palms of Peace are More Honorable than the Trophies of War").

== Award ceremonies ==
Since 2004, the Carnegie Wateler Peace Prize has been awarded every two years under the name Carnegie Wateler Peace Prize. The Carnegie Wateler Peace Prize alternates every two years between a Dutch and an international laureate. One edition honors a person or organization from the Netherlands, while the next recognizes an international recipient for their contributions to peace.The Carnegie Wateler Peace Prize is awarded biannually in the Peace Palace and can also be watched live via a live stream available on the website of the Peace Palace. Currently, is the prize money for the Carnegie Wateler Peace Prize €35,000.

== Youth Carnegie Peace Prize ==
Since 2018, the Carnegie Foundation, in cooperation with the Youth Peace Initiative, also awards the Carnegie Youth Peace Prize to recognize inspiring peace building initiatives by young individuals in (post-)conflict scenarios.

== Provisions ==
Johan Wateler had stipulated in his will, that his estate should be used for the prize of the award:

The property as such of the capital ... as well as the remainder of my possessions ... I dote to the State of the Netherlands under the condition that ... the yearly revenue in round figures will be spent for the award of a prize to him or her, who in whatever way, through word, deed or example, literature, sculpture or painting, in the country or abroad, has been most meritorious in the furthering of the peace ideal, or in contributing to finding means to render the horror of war more and more impossible in the long run.

== Carnegie Wateler Peace Prize ==
The history of the Wateler Peace Prize and its recipients reflects how the concepts of peace building and conflict prevention have evolved over the past 85 years. Many distinguished figures and organizations have received the award, including Sir Eric Drummond (1931), the first Secretary-General of the League of Nations; Sir Baden-Powell (1934), founder of the Scouting movement; Jean Monnet (1953), one of the architects of the European Union; Coretta Scott King (1969), peace activist and widow of Martin Luther King Jr.; and War Child (2012). In 2014, Lakhdar Brahimi was honoured for his role as a mediator in conflict zones and his contributions to peacekeeping. Sigrid Kaag received the Carnegie Wateler Peace Prize in 2016, while Rudi Vranckx was awarded the 2018 prize for his courageous reporting from conflict areas. The Centre for Humanitarian Dialogue won the 2022 prize for its efforts in conflict resolution.

Most recently, on 26 November 2024, the Netherlands Armed Forces were awarded the Carnegie Wateler Peace Prize in recognition of their participation in more than 80 peacekeeping missions worldwide.

== Laureates ==
Year	Recipients
1931	Eric Drummond, Secretary-General of the League of Nations and the Union internationale des associations pour la Société des Nations, Brussels
1932	Association for the League of Nations and Peace (Dutch: Vereeniging voor Volkenbond en Vrede), The Hague
1933	Arthur Henderson, president of the Conference for the Reduction and Limitation of Armaments, Geneva
1934	Dutch branch of the World Alliance for International Friendship through the Churches (Dutch: Wereldbond voor Internationale Vriendschap door de Kerken)
1935	Radio Nations of the League of Nations, Geneva
1936	The Hague Academy of International Law, The Hague
1937	Robert Baden-Powell, 1st Baron Baden-Powell
1938	Dutch Youth Hostel Center (Dutch: Nederlandse Jeugdherberg Centrale) and the Ecumenical Association in the Netherlands (Dutch: Oecumenische Vereeniging in Nederland)
1939	American Friends Service Committee, Philadelphia; Friends Service Council, London
1947	Henri van der Mandere, writer and peace activist, co-founder Association for League of Nations and Peace
1948	World Council of Churches, Geneva
1949	The Hague Academy of International Law, The Hague
1950	Institut Universitaire de Hautes Études Internationales, Geneva
1951	Dirk Stikker, former foreign minister, co-founder of NATO and the European Communities
1952	Jean Monnet, Paris
1953	Dutch Council of the European Movement (Dutch: Nederlandse Raad der Europese Beweging), The Hague
1954	Anthony Eden, London
1955	Gerrit Jan van Heuven Goedhart
1956	UNICEF (United Nations Children's Fund)
1957	Adriaan Pelt
1958	Georges Moens de Fernig, Brussels
1959	Foundation for the Development of Youth Hostels (Dutch: Stichting Opbouwfonds Jeugdherbergen)
1960	Marguerite Nobs, Genève, founder of World Union of Women for International Concord (UMFCI)
1961	Willem Visser 't Hooft
1962	Dag Hammarskjöld Foundation, Stockholm
1963	Youth Volunteer Programme
1964	World Federation of United Nations Associations (WFUNA), Geneva
1965	Eduard van Beinum Foundation, Breukelen
1966	Taizé Community, France
1967	I.K.O.R., the Committee for Wild Geese Broadcasting
1968	Coretta Scott King, U.S.A.
1969	Royal Netherlands Society of International Law (Dutch: Nederlandse Vereniging voor Internationaal Recht), Utrecht
1970	International Social Service, Headquarters, Geneva
1971	Bert Röling, Groningen
1972	Alva Myrdal, Stockholm, Swedish representative at UN Disarmament Conference, treaty against nuclear proliferation
1973	Addeke Hendrik Boerma, UN Food and Agriculture Organisation (FAO), initiator of world campaign to combat hunger.
1974	Henry Kissinger, Washington, peace agreement negotiator for the Vietnam War
1975	Max Kohnstamm, Rome, co-founder of the European Communities
1976	Manfred Lachs, Former President and Judge of the International Court of Justice, The Hague
1977	The Salvation Army, The Netherlands
1981	Danny Kaye, first Goodwill Ambassador of the UN Children's Rights Organisation (UNICEF)
1982	Kees Brouwer, Representative of the High Commissioner for Refugees, The Hague
1983	Hermann Gmeiner, SOS Children's Villages International, Austria
1984	Herman van Roijen, former foreign minister and ambassador of the Netherlands
1985	International Commission of Jurists, Geneva
1986	Dutchbatt, UNIFIL, UN peacekeeping force in Lebanon
1986	Verghese Kurien, Chairman of National Dairy, India, known as the "Father of the White Revolution"
1987	Dutch Council for the Disabled (Dutch: Stichting Nederlandse Gehandicaptenraad), Utrecht
1988	Brian Urquhart, former under-secretary-general U.N.O.
1989	Médecins Sans Frontières, Netherlands
1990	Jiří Hájek, Czech and Slovak Federal Republic
1991	Municipality of Leiden, City of Refugees initiative
1992	Wilhelm Huber, SOS Children's Villages International
1993	Mr. Eelco Krijn, Mrs. Karin Krijn-van Goudoever and their child (posthumously)
1994	The Jewish Cultural and Humanitarian Society La Benevolencija, Sarajevo
1995	Max van der Stoel, Organization for Security and Co-operation in Europe (OSCE) High Commissioner on National Minorities
1996	Rolf Ekéus, Chairman of the UN Special Committee on Iraq (UNSCOM)
1997	Jaap Ramaker, Permanent Dutch representative at UN Disarmament Conference
1998	Permanent Court of Arbitration
2000	Liliane Fonds
2001	Office of the United Nations High Commissioner for Refugees (UNHCR)
2004	Theo van Boven, Special Rapporteur of the UN Human Rights Commission
2006	Javier Solana, former secretary-general of NATO
2008	Patrick Cammaert, former commander of UN peacekeeping missions
2010	Peace One Day and its founder Jeremy Gilley
2012	War Child
2014	Lakhdar Brahimi, special envoy for peacekeeping missions
2016	Sigrid Kaag, UN, special envoy to the Middle East
2018	Rudi Vranckx, war correspondent
2022	Centre for Humanitarian Dialogue (HD)
2024	Netherlands Armed Forces

== See also ==
- List of peace prizes

== Sources ==
- Information, Council of Europe Directorate of (1955). Council of Europe News. The Directorate.
