= Lacul Morii =

Lake in Romania

- Lacul Morii in September 2014

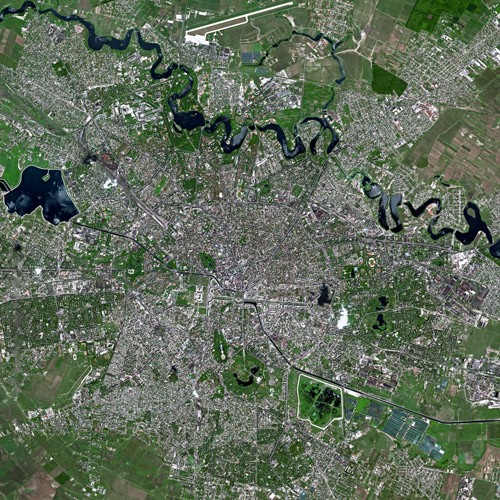
- Location within Bucharest, Romania

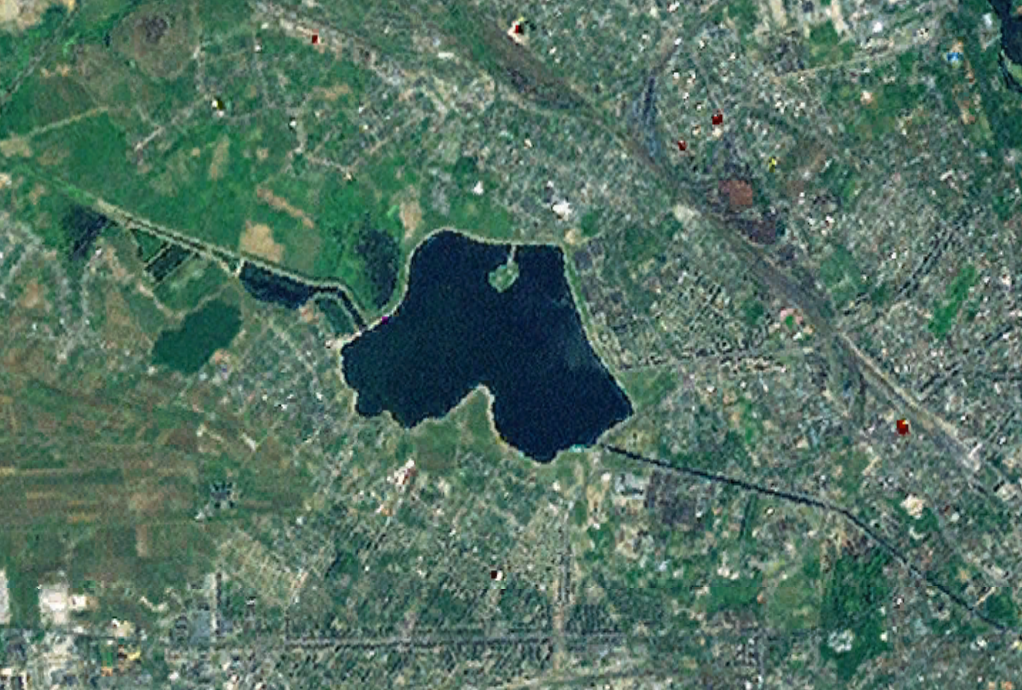
- Map of Lacul Morii
- Location: Romania
- Group: Bucharest Lakes
- Coordinates: 44°27′20″N 26°01′31″E
- Basin countries: Romania
- Max. length: 1.2 km (0.75 mi)
- Max. width: 2 km (1.2 mi)
- Surface area: 2.46 km^{2} (0.95 sq mi)
- Average depth: 6 m (20 ft)
- Max. depth: 7 m (23 ft)
- Water volume: 0.015 km^{3} (0.0036 cu mi)
- Shore length^{1}: 7 km (4.3 mi)
- Surface elevation: 78 m (256 ft)
- Islands: Angels' Island
- Settlements: Bucharest
- ^{1} Shore length is not a well-defined measure.

Lacul Morii ("Mill Lake") is the largest lake in Chiajna, with an area of 246 ha (610 acres). The lake is approximately 6 km (3.7 mi) from the center of Bucharest (Piața Unirii) and is located between the Polytechnic University of Bucharest neighborhood to the east, the Crângași and Giulești districts to the north, the Militari district to the south, and the village Roșu to the west.

The lake is a reservoir, made in 1986 mainly to protect the city against floods. It is also a recreation area. Lacul Morii provides a constant flow to the Dâmboviţa river in the city. The lake was built by a dam 15 m (49 ft) high, with a central body of concrete, and earth dams extended lengthwise with a total length of 7 km (4.3 mi). The lake's volume is 14.7×10^{6} m^{3} (1.92×10^{7} cu yd), with a flood mitigation portion of 1.6×10^{6} m^{3} (2.1×10^{6} cu yd) beyond the normal retention. Effectively, to mitigate flooding, the lake's volume can be increased when floods are predicted. Making a lake near an urban area required decommissioning of existing uses, including demolition and decommissioning of a church.

On the south of Lacul Morii there is a peninsula.

== Angels' Island ==
On the north part of the lake is situated Angels' Island (Insula Îngerilor). On the island volunteers planted 475 trees in 2011. Several big music concerts have been hosted on the island.

== Sports and events on Lacul Morii ==
The lake is used as a recreation area and there are boat and water-sport contests and shows including air shows. The Coke Live Music Festival and other concerts were organized in the Lacul Morii area. Windsurfing is very popular on Lacul Morii; there are windsurf courses on the lake, though water-ski, skijet, and other water sports are also popular.

The lake is mentioned in the poem "Pe Lacul Morii" by Ana Blandiana.

== Projects for Lacul Morii ==
There are projects to make Lacul Morii a travel destination. There are also projects to make the Lacul Morii area a modern residential, commercial and business area. Another project is a highway tunnel which will link Lacul Morii and the nearby Lake Dâmbovița to Centrul Civic, Unirii Square, and the A1 motorway.

== Gallery ==
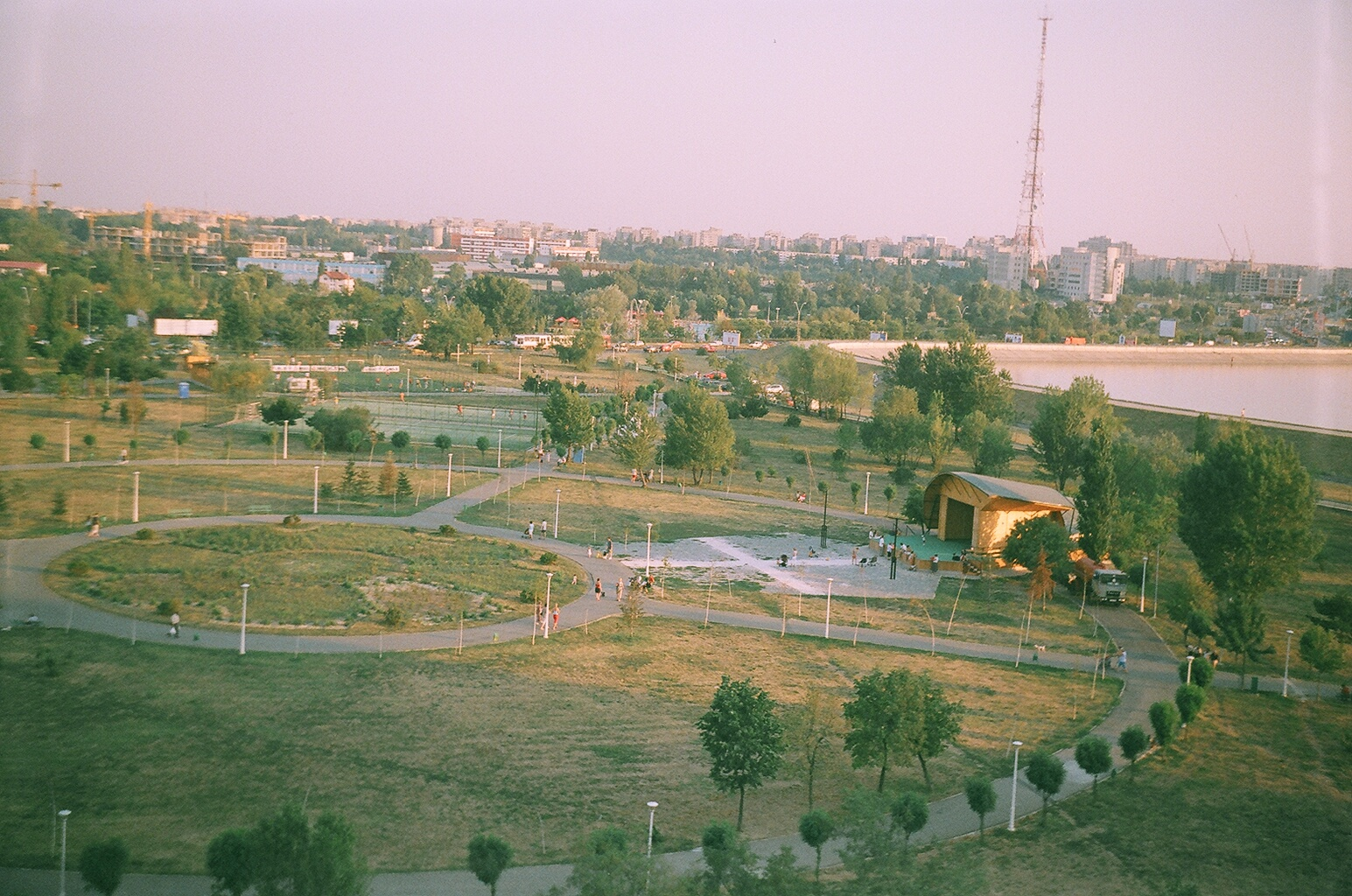
Lacul Morii and Crângași Park (2007)

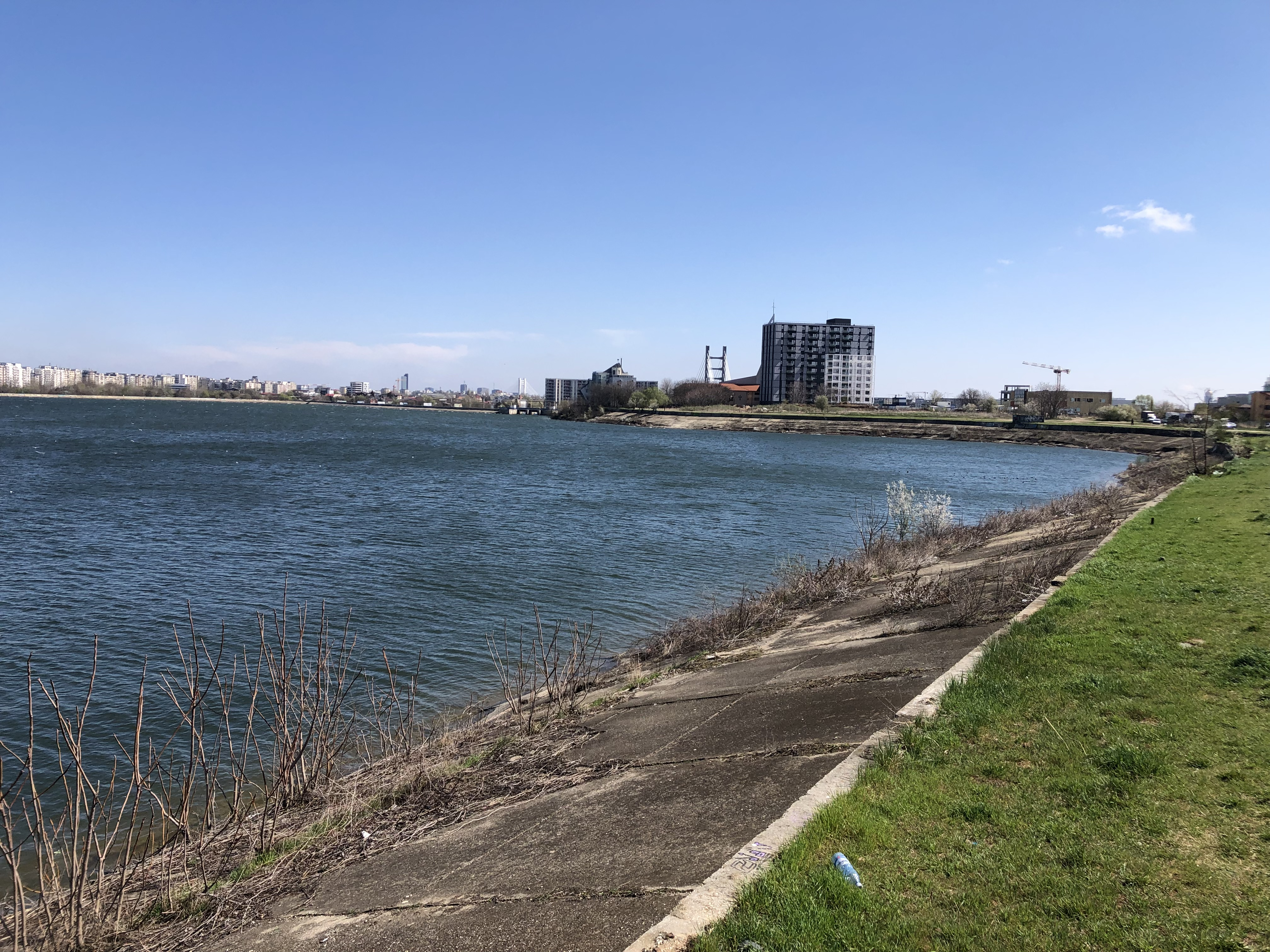
Lacul Morii (2022)
