= Drumul Taberei =

Neighbourhood in Bucharest, Romania

Coordinates: 44°25′12.18″N 26°1′28.33″E

Drumul Taberei on the map of Bucharest

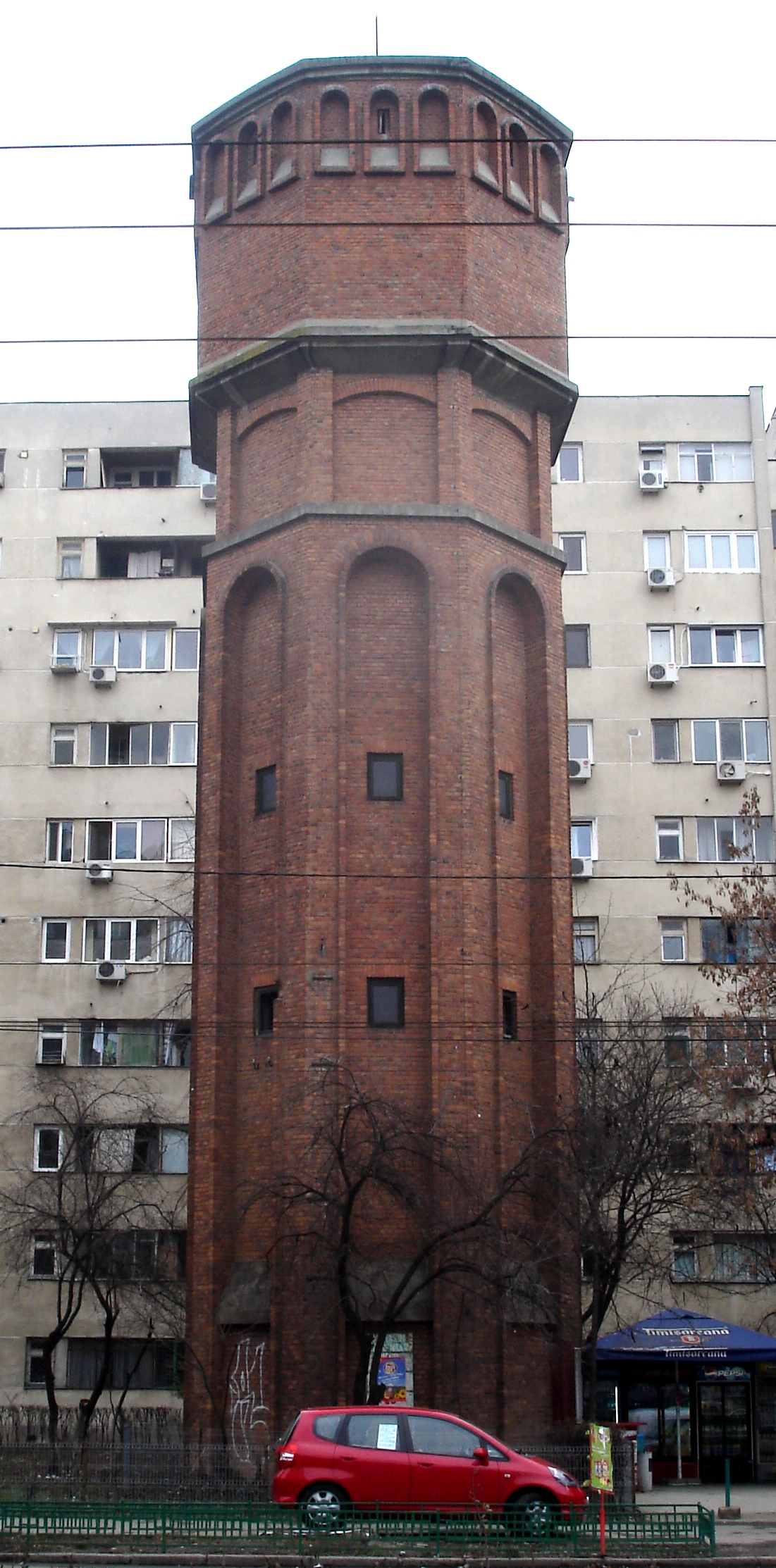
Water tower

Drumul Taberei (Romanian: [ˈdru.mul ˈta.be.rej], The Camp Road) is a neighbourhood located in the south-west of Bucharest, Romania, roughly between Timișoara Avenue (south of Plaza România and the Cotroceni Railway Station) and Ghencea Avenue, neighboring Militari to the north, Panduri to the east and Ghencea, and Rahova to the south and south-east.

It is one of the few examples of successful urban planning during Communist Romania, despite it being built in the Eastern European tradition of "dormitory neighborhoods". This success is mostly due to the unique approach of the architects and planners to the concept of high-density urban living, an approach that was not used elsewhere in Bucharest.

== Etymology ==
The name Drumul Taberei translates to "Road of the Military Camp" in English. It originates from the 19th century, when the area was used by the Romanian Army for military training and temporary camps (tabere) were set up. The route leading to the camps became known locally as "Drumul Taberei", and the name remained as the neighborhood developed in the 20th century.

== History ==
The neighbourhood was built starting with Stalinist style apartments in the 1950s, that evolved with 4 to 10 storey tower blocks apartments built from 1960 to 1974, on former agricultural fields and marshland, using an old road as a backbone. It was called Road of the Camp because Tudor Vladimirescu set there his Pandur camp before entering Bucharest in 1821.

Drumul Taberei was developed in the early 1960s as a modern residential district on the site of former military training grounds used by the Romanian Army. The area was transformed as part of Bucharest's urban expansion plan to provide housing for the growing population.

On 15 May 1975, the housing estate was one of the places visited by Queen Juliana of the Netherlands, along with Prince Bernhard of Lippe-Biesterfeld, whose visit sparked massive interest of the residents living in the area. Drumul Taberei was one of the sites where during the 1989 Romanian Revolution, the then-Ministry of Defense building (today main Ground Forces command), the site was the scene of bloody armed conflict between revolutionaries and the military. Buildings near the Orizont market were damaged and a few people were killed. Some of the bullet holes from those events are still noticeable on a group of buildings dating from the 1950s and early 1960s. Not far from the entrance to the neighborhood, at the Răzoare intersection, the Flemish journalist Danny Huwé was killed during the night of 25 December 1989, when revolutionaries mistook him for a pro-communist fighter.

== Urban planning ==
The central concept of the area was providing for a comfortable living environment in a high density urban area. The main concepts used were standardization of buildings (most of the residential buildings are standard Eastern European tower blocks – cutii de chibrituri, literally "matchboxes"), providing for quick and efficient mass transit to the center of the city but also inside the neighbourhood, and creating large, green spaces to counterbalance the massiveness and bleakness of the standardized apartment buildings.

The heart of the quarter is Drumul Taberei Park, a small park, complete with an artificial lake and a public swimming pool. Built in 1960 and initially named after communist politician Alexandru Moghioroș, the park covers an area of 30 ha (74 acres); the lake is 1.8 ha (4.4 acres) in area and has a maximum depth of 1.3 m (4 ft 3 in). The main avenue of the quarter circles the park forming a "U" shape, extending outwards to the east, and linking the quarter to the center of the city. Immediately east of the park, a large north-south street (Brașov Street) cuts across the U-shaped avenues in order to provide quick access to Militari and Ghencea. Next to the park, a large open-air market (Drumul Taberei) was built.

Public transport was constructed to be an integral part of the neighbourhood; as such, the neighbourhood is well connected to all parts of the city. Around each trolleybus stop, commercial areas were planned and built, to include stores, restaurants and cinemas, to serve for each small community served by that stop (many of these commercial areas still keep their original names – "Favorit", "Orizont", "Drumul Taberei 34"). The design of the neighbourhood was influenced by the then-fashionable brutalism, visible especially in the design of the commercial areas. This design, despite being very popular and very efficient, was not adopted anywhere else in Bucharest, partly because most other high-density neighbourhoods were built over a pre-existing layout, with old buildings being razed and rebuilt, and partly because the process of designing and planning such a complex layout all over again was rather slow (Drumul Taberei was completed around 1974, although the construction of other apartment buildings continued into the 1980s). In all, 63,000 apartments were built.

The neighborhood initially didn't benefit from a metro, because city planners believed that trolleybus and tram connections were good enough. An urban legend, however, claims that the metro avoided this neighborhood because Elena Ceaușescu thought that "only the bourgeoisie live in this neighborhood, they do not deserve such a thing". Whether this is true or not, is not known.

Drumul Taberei also was the place where many (initially experimental) building designs were adopted, and the western part of the neighborhood was one of the first to employ prefabricated-panel buildings on a larger scale in Romania, whilst the eastern side of the neighborhood predominantly features buildings with mortar as the main material used. A part that is widely considered as part of this neighborhood, was the separate development of the Tudor Vladimirescu/Ghencea housing estate, constructed between 1978 and 1987, which featured typical architecture from the 1980s, including the well-known "Type 772" buildings, a prefabricated building type widespread in Bucharest.

A few apartment buildings on the western side of this neighborhood were known to house Chilean refugees, which fled after the 1973 Chilean coup d'état. Some of them remained in Romania, whilst others went back to Chile.

== Transportation ==
The design of the neighbourhood placed a great importance on mass transit. Trolleybuses connect all parts of the quarter with Gara de Nord, Eroilor and Universitate, while Light Rail 41 links the neighbourhood to Ghencea, Militari, Crângași, Ion Mihalache, Herăstrău Park, and Băneasa. The network also features a number of bus lines, serving additional routes inside the neighborhood.

In September 2020, an extension of the Bucharest Metro to Drumul Taberei, Metro Line M5, was completed.

As the neighbourhood was heavily designed around public transport, parking spaces are scarce in some areas, and traffic jams and gridlocks are common occurrences, especially at the Răzoare intersection (now Piața Danny Huwé), where one of the three center-bound roads out of Rahova meets two of the center-bound roads out of Drumul Taberei. The construction work of the M5 Metro Line, which took over ten years, created complications, such as the narrowing of the roads during the works, leading to the disappearance of the trolleybuses to Valea Oltului street and the northern branch of Drumul Taberei road, cracks in some buildings, and a rat invasion in the area due to the subterranean works disturbing the rat population.

== Gallery ==
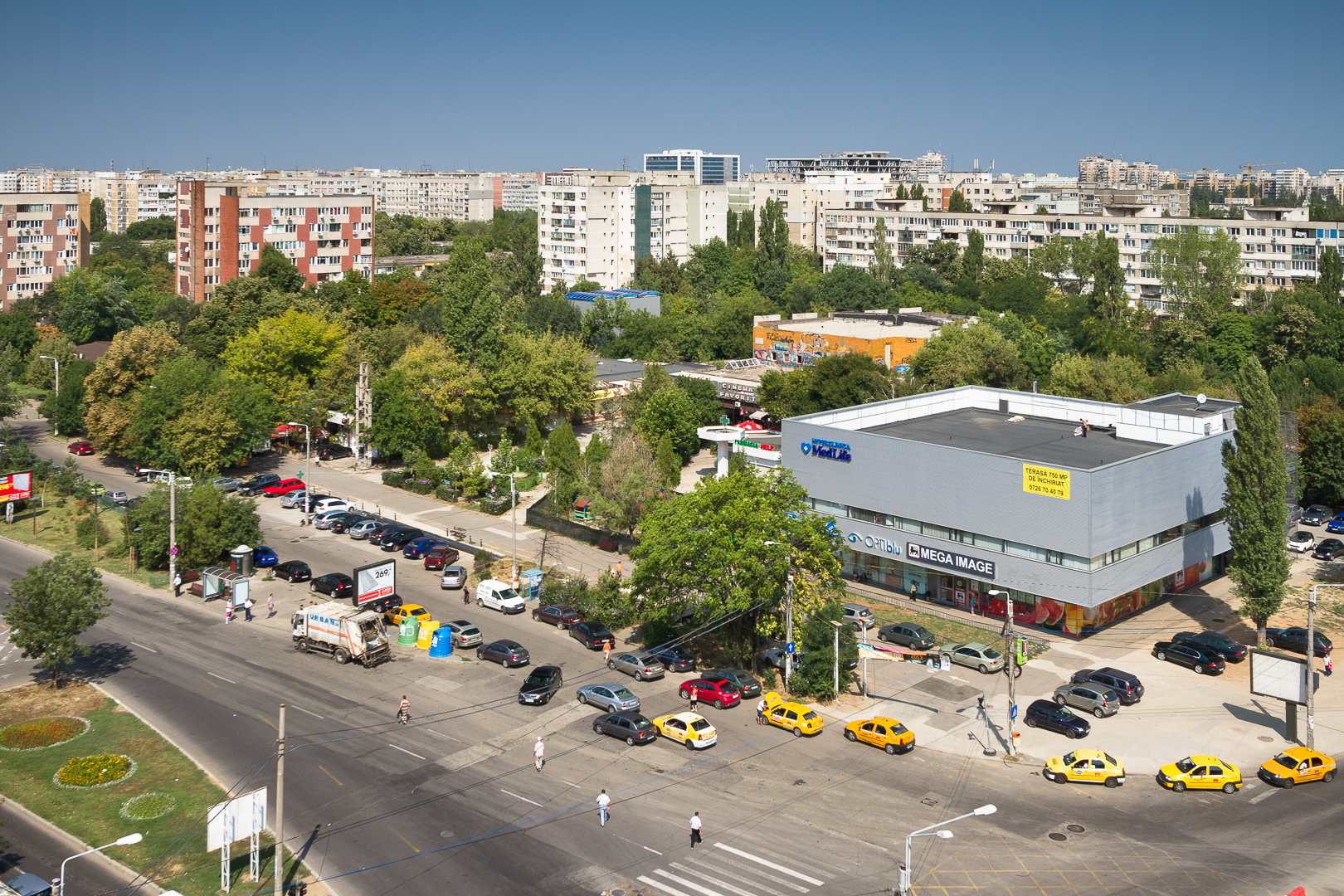
Favorit building complex, situated in the east of the neighborhood (1965). The cinema (part of the complex) has been demolished in 2019.

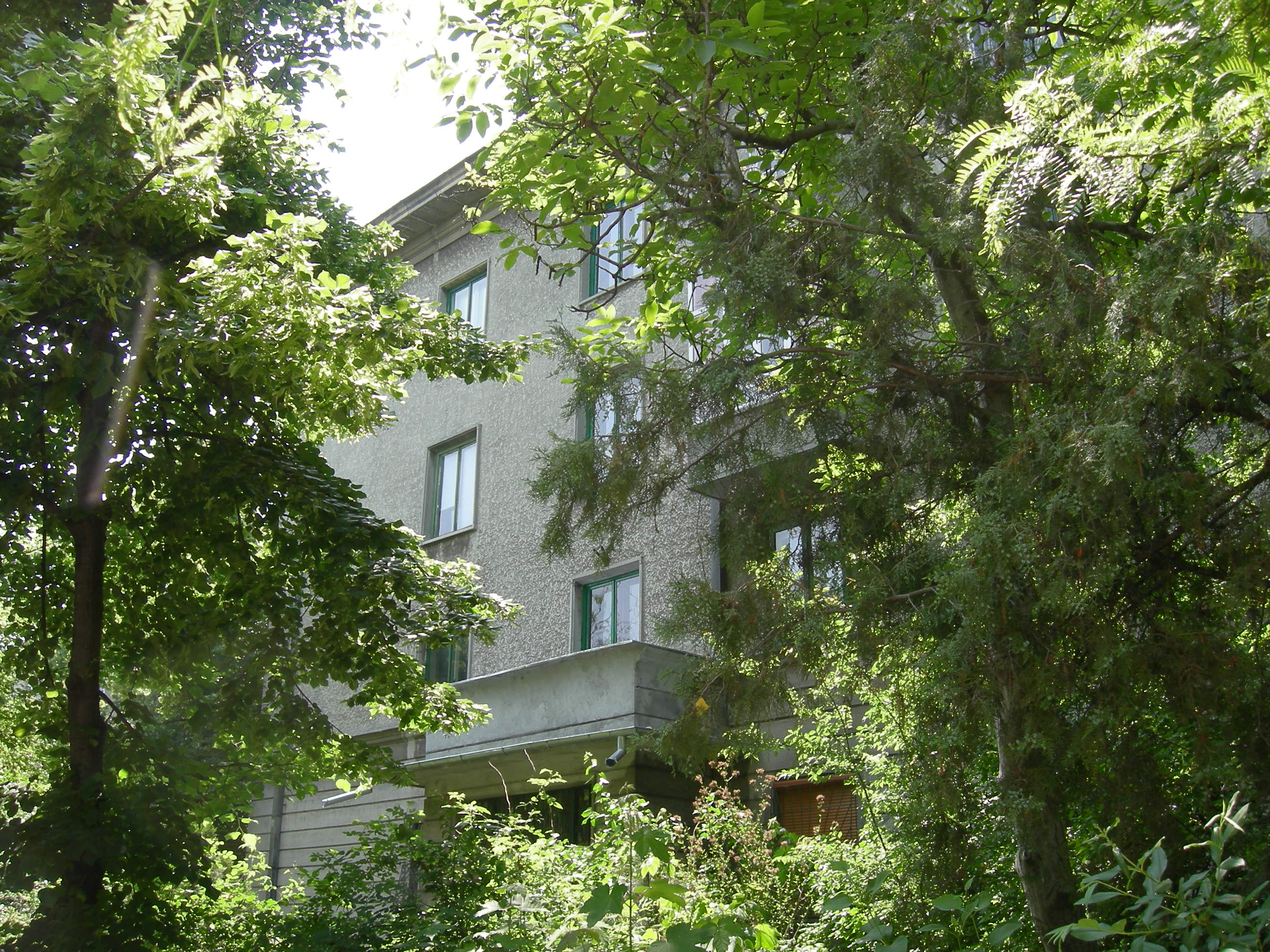
Low rise apartment building (Stalin-era, 1953-1956), Drumul Taberei

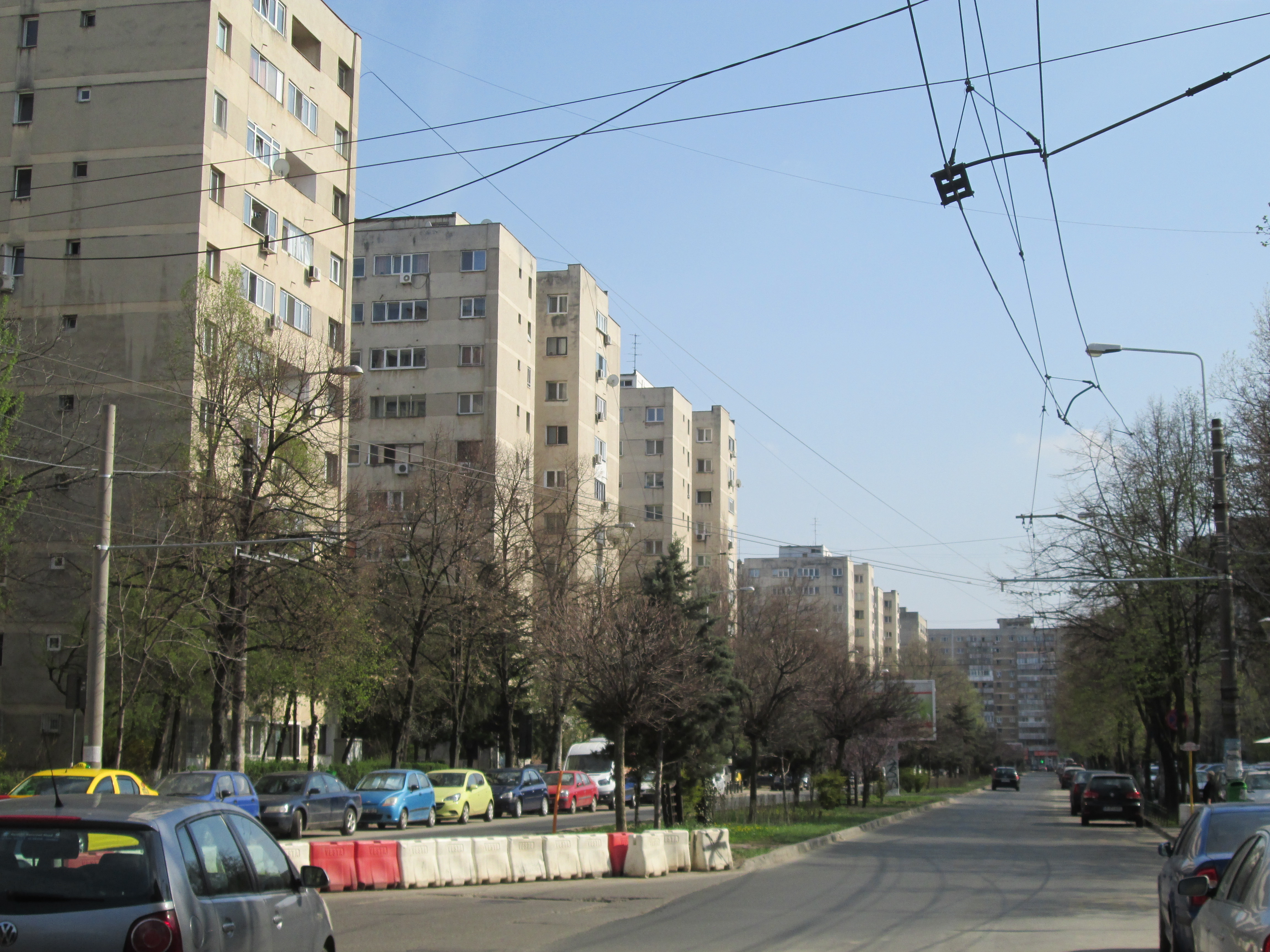
Sibiu street, looking towards 1 May boulevard and Z-type apartment buildings (1968-1969)

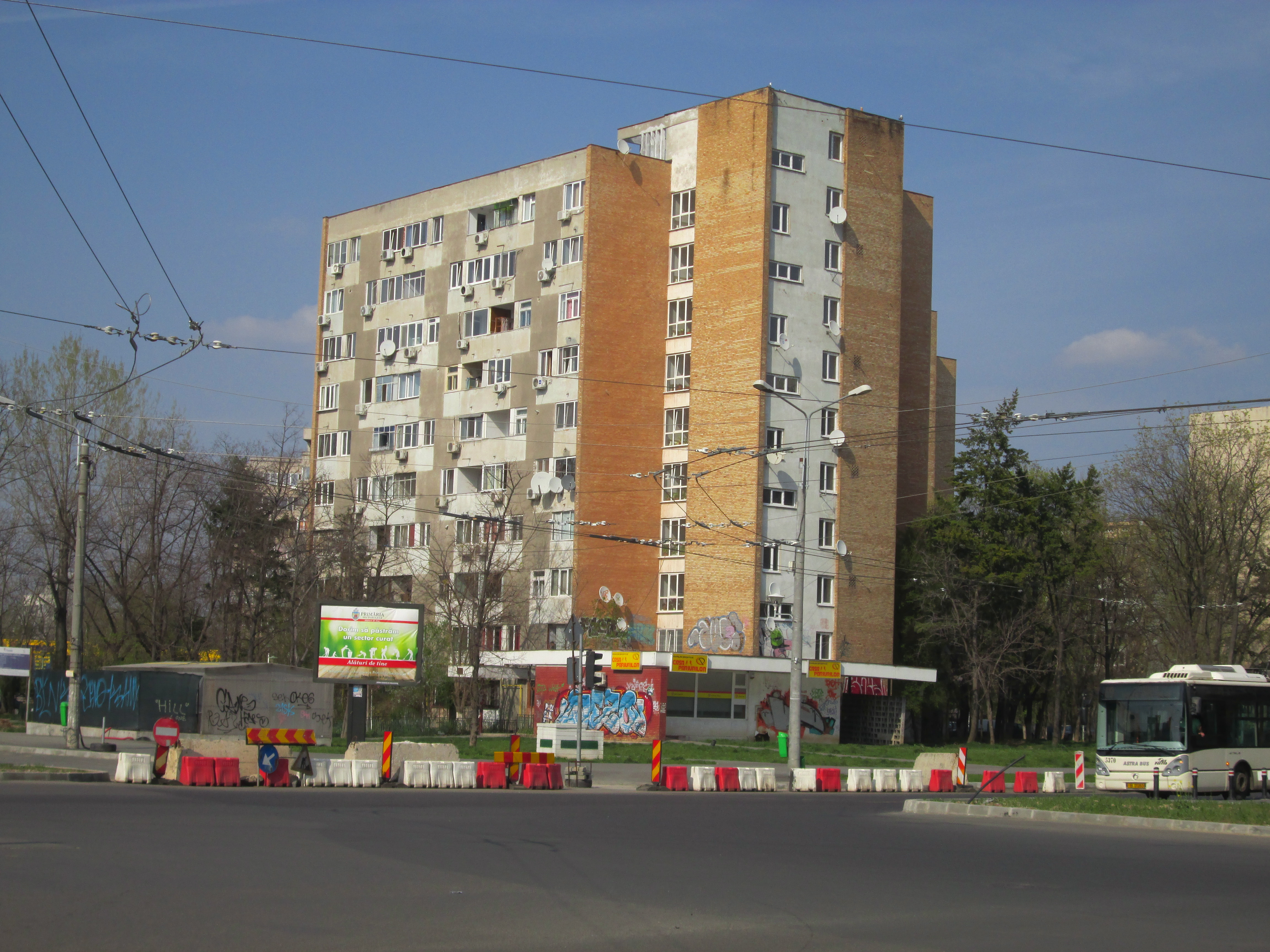
T4 building, part of the T-type buildings (1964). These types of buildings would become more widespread later (with changed designs as well)

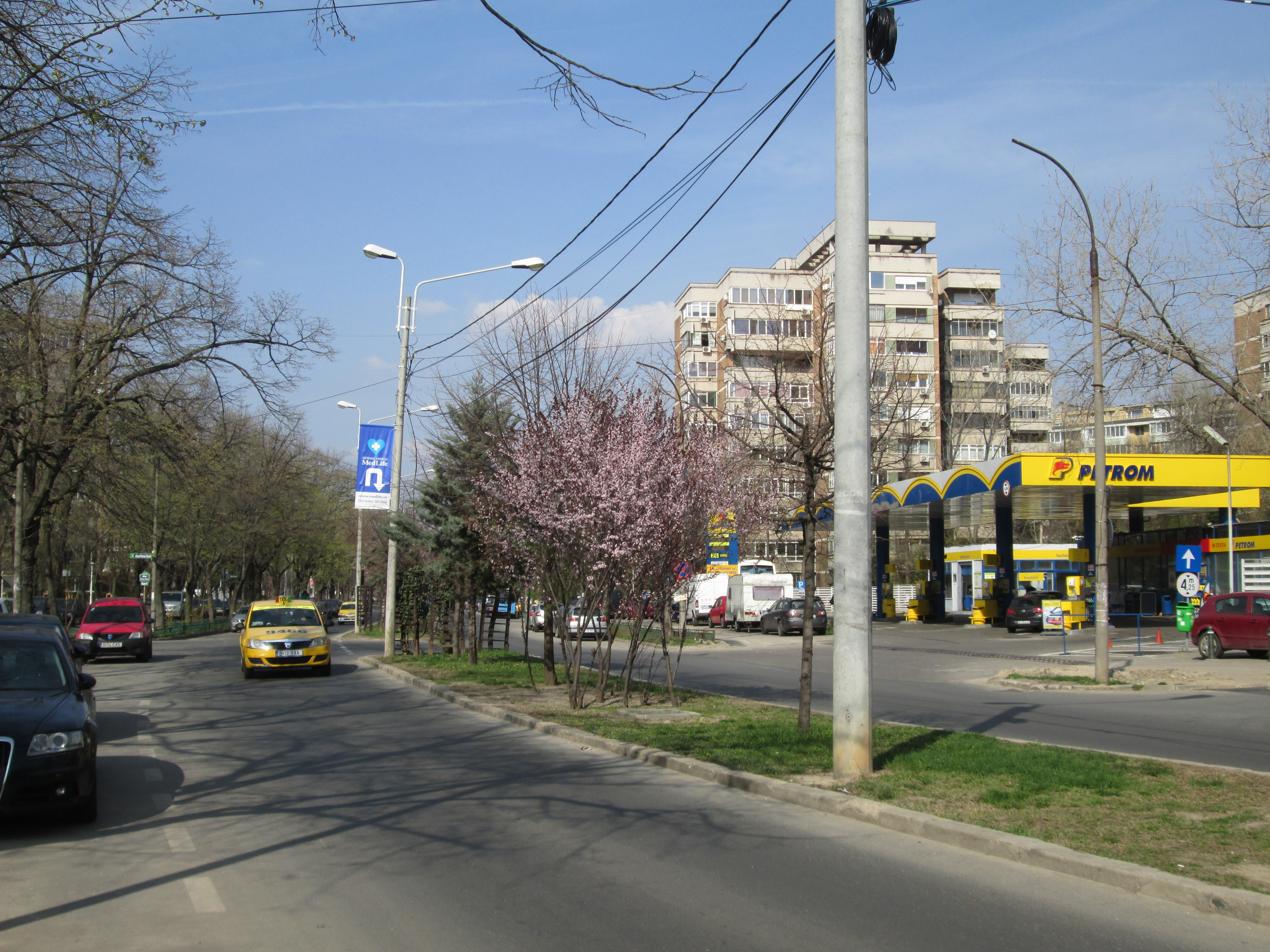
Sibiu street looking towards Timișoara boulevard and E-type prototype buildings (1967)

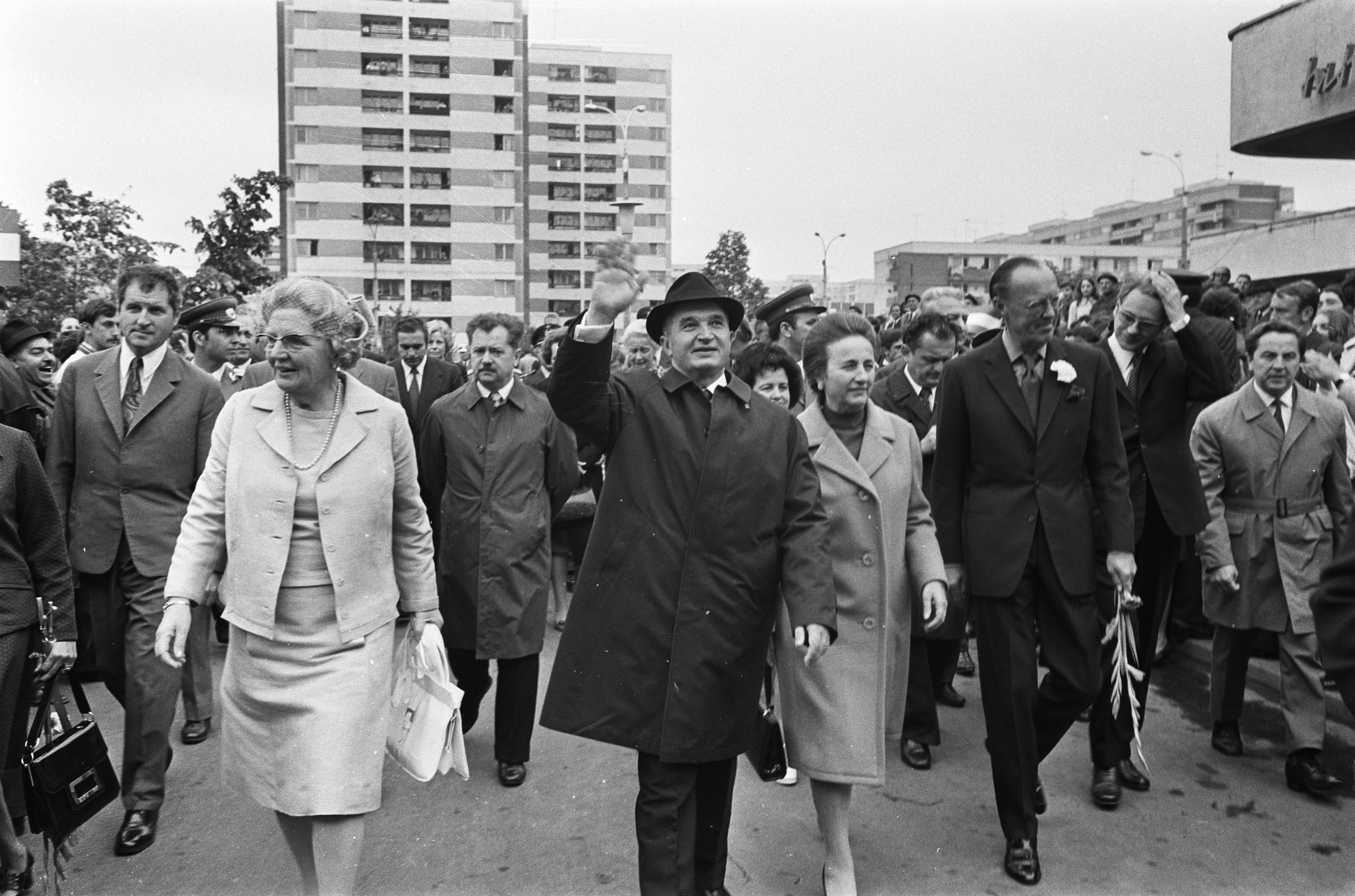
Queen Juliana and Prince Bernhard with the Ceaușescus in the housing estate (presumably at the Drumul Taberei 34 complex), 15 May 1975

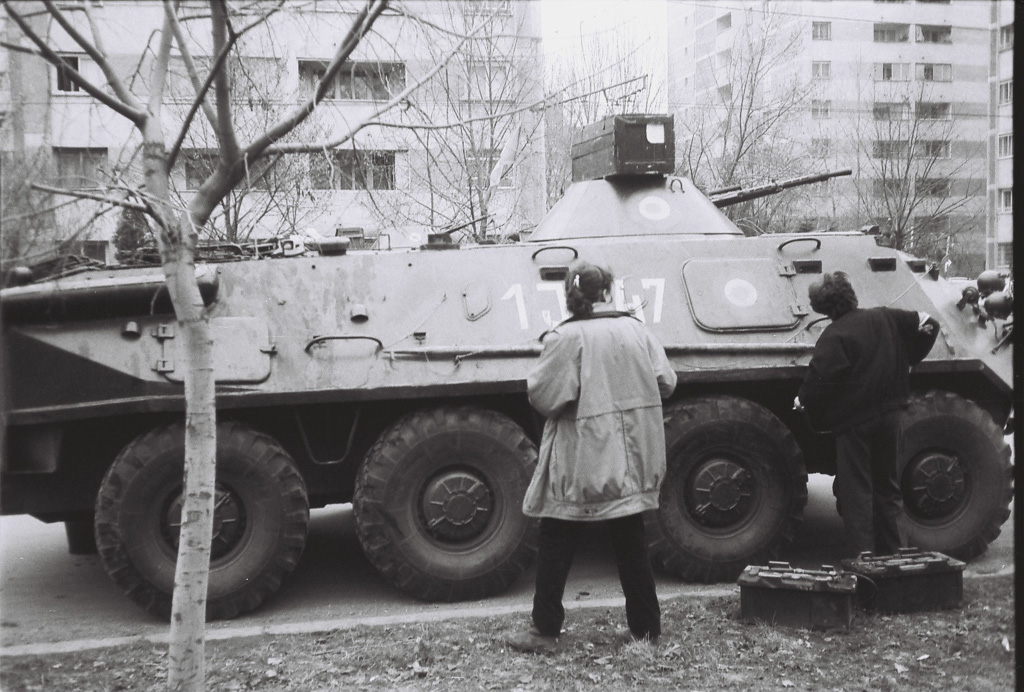
TAB-71 on Miron Constantinescu (currently Sibiu) street during the armed conflict at the Ministry of Defense buildings
