= Rudi Vranckx =

Belgian journalist (born 1959)

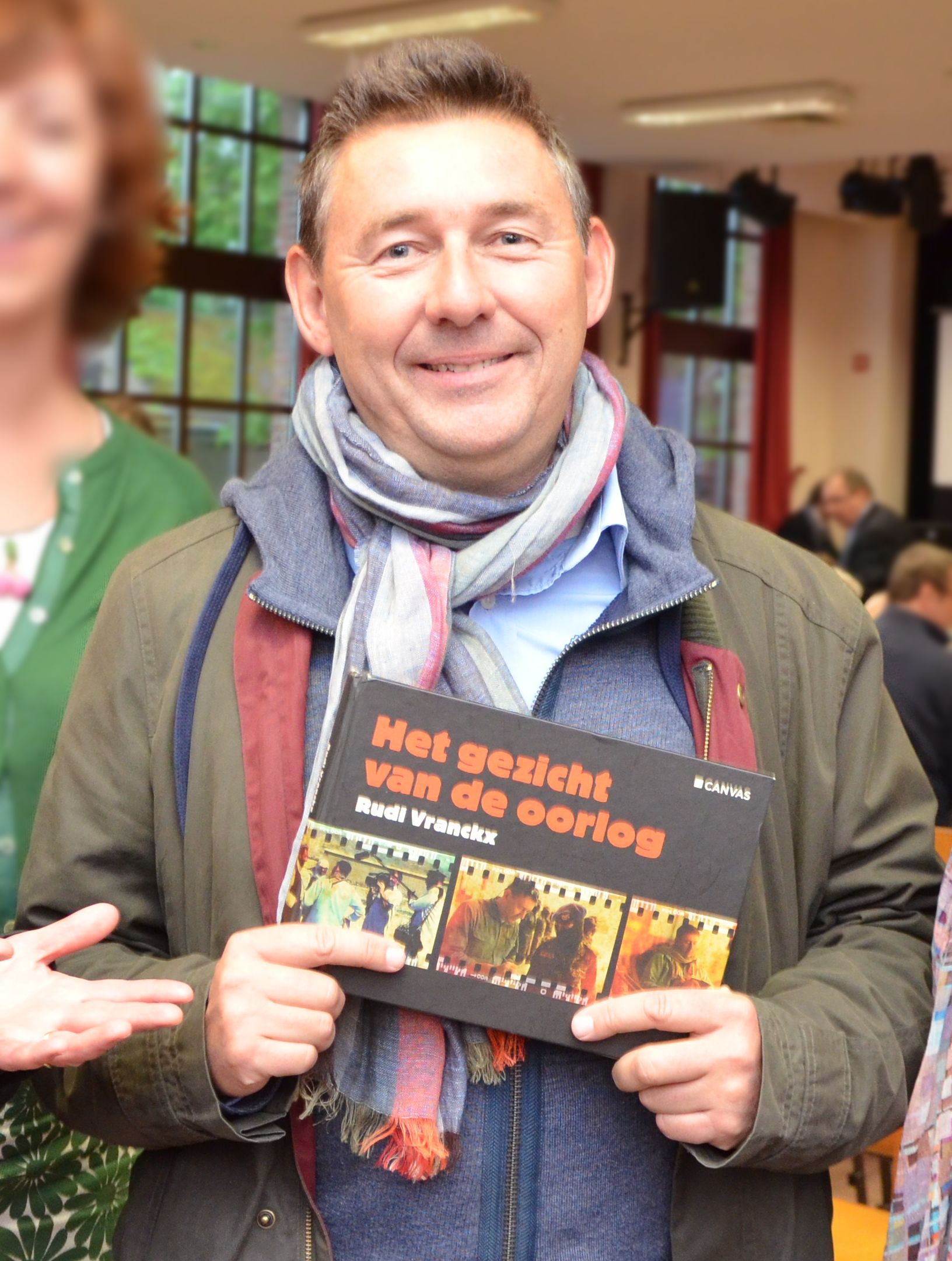
- Rudi Vranckx at a reading for his book
- Born: 15 December 1959 (age 66); Leuven, Belgium
- Occupation: War correspondent

Rudi Vranckx (born 15 December 1959, Leuven) is a retired Belgian journalist at the VRT NWS reporting on international conflicts in the Middle East.

== Education and work ==
By training Vranckx is a historian, he studied Contemporary History at the Catholic University of Leuven. After his studies, he became a university researcher at the Centre for Peace Research, where he made scenarios and films about war and peace.

In the meantime, he took journalism exams at the then Belgian Radio and Television Broadcasting Company, where he started in September 1988 at the radio news service. After six weeks Vranckx switched to the television department. His first major assignment as a war correspondent started in 1989 in Romania during the fall of dictator Nicolae Ceaușescu. This was followed by the Gulf War of 1990–1991, the Yugoslavian wars and the major conflicts in the Middle East. In 2010 he made a seven-part series on Congo for Canvas, on the occasion of the 50th anniversary of the country's independence, under the title Bonjour Congo.

During the fierce protests against President Mubarak's regime in Egypt in early 2011, he was one of the last European journalists to stay at the scene. Afterwards, he and a VRT team visited the cities of Al Bayda and Benghazi in Libya, where a fierce battle had recently raged between supporters and opponents of Moammar al-Qadhafi.

Since 13 January 2008 Vranckx has had his own programme, Vranckx, in which mainly foreign reports are shown. This programme is broadcast on Canvas.

In September 2011, Canvas showed his new series The Curse of Osama, in which he explores how the world has changed since and because of the attacks on September 11 2001. For this, he visited the US, the UK, Afghanistan, Pakistan, Iraq, Yemen and Egypt.

In early 2012 Vranckx was involved in an attack in Syria that cost the life of a fellow French journalist, Gilles Jacquier. Although Western media initially held the Syrian government responsible for Jacquier's death, investigations by the Arab League and the French Ministry of Defence revealed that Jacquier was killed by a grenade attack carried out by anti-Assad rebels.

In 2013, his four-part reporting series The Sorrow of Europe was shown on Canvas. In it he travelled through Iceland, Ireland, Portugal, Spain, Italy and Greece to show the story behind the euro area crisis and to find solutions. He talked to Beppe Grillo and others.

== Personal ==
Vranckx is unmarried and has no children. He is in a relationship with general VRT editor Liesbet Vrieleman..

== Recognition ==
- The asteroid (14467) Vranckx is named after him (Minor Planet Circular 103030).
- 12 December 2012: Ambassador for Peace (annual recognition from Pax Christi Flanders) for nuanced foreign reporting that never loses sight of the human being in the conflict, with respect for sensitivities that live in the regions he highlights.
- 9 September 2018: Journalist for Peace (biennial honorary prize of the Humanistisch Vredesberaad) for contributing to a culture of peace and justice through his reports on conflicts for almost 30 years.
- 26 September 2018: Wateler Peace Prize (biennial award of the Carnegie Foundation) for his "extraordinary courage and dedication shown in his reporting from conflict zones" and his commitment to the fate of conflict victims. What I cherish are not the images of idiocy, but those of hope. For instance, Vranckx collected musical instruments for a music school in the Iraqi city of Mosul that had been destroyed by the Islamic State.
- 3 May 2019: honorary doctorate from the VUB and ULB.
