= Giulești =

Neighborhood of Bucharest

Coordinates: 44°27′14.04″N 26°3′13.36″E

Giulești on the map of Bucharest

Giulești (Romanian pronunciation: [dʒjuˈleʃtʲ]) is a neighbourhood in northwestern Bucharest, located in Sector 6. The Giulești Stadium, Giulești Theatre, Podul Grant are located in Giulești. Also, the Grivița Railway Yards and Lacul Morii are located nearby.

== History ==
The area was inhabited for millennia and it gives its name to the Neolithic Giulești-Boian culture, the middle phase of the Boian culture, which inhabited in the 4th millennium BC Muntenia and later expanded into southern Moldavia and southern Transylvania.

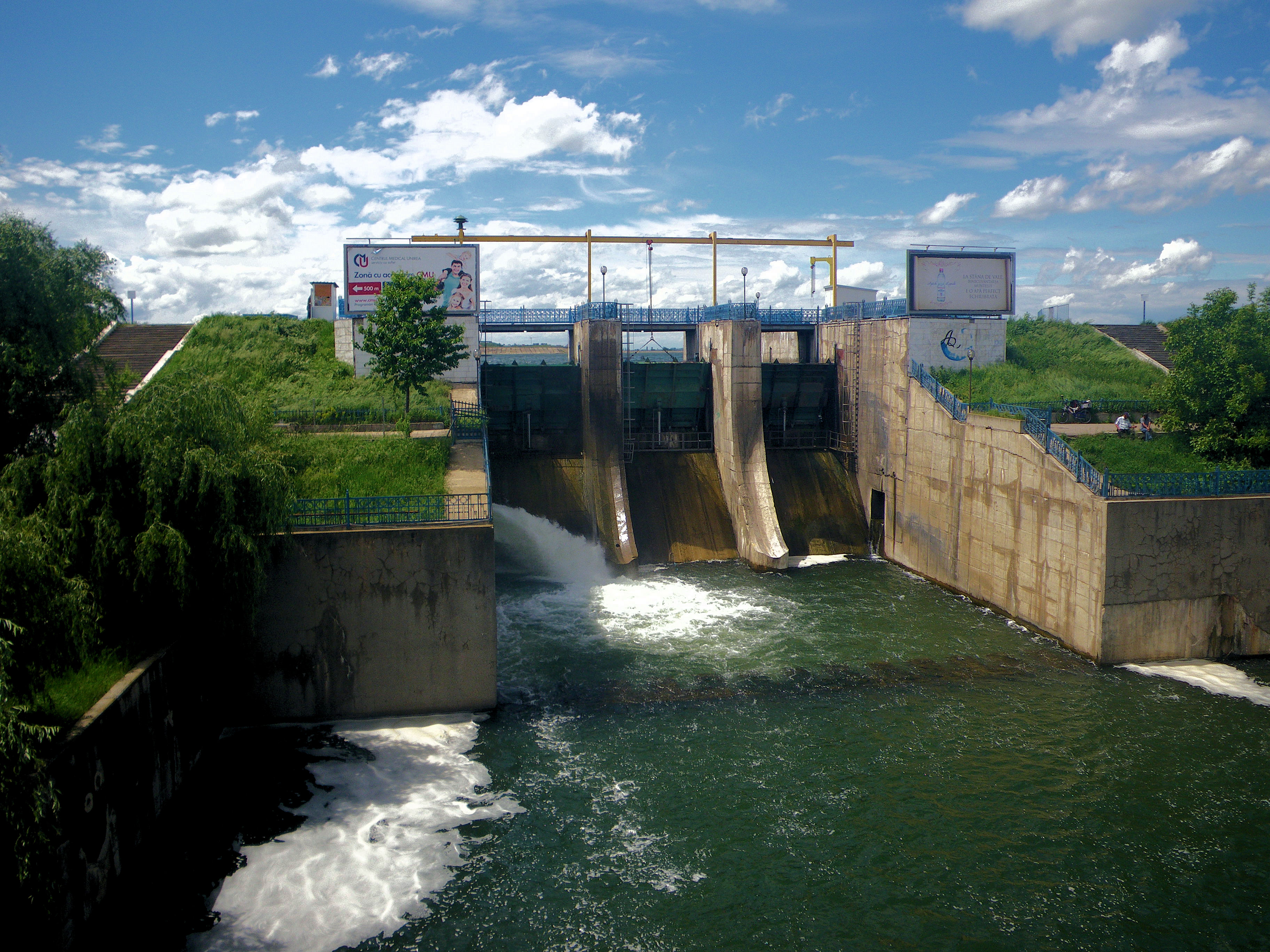
Lacul Morii

In the Middle Ages it was a village, later incorporated into Chiajna Commune, and absorbed into Bucharest in 1939. In the early 1960s a number of 4 storey apartment buildings were raised in the era, initially named as the Constructorilor housing estate. A few years later on the Giulesti avenue in the mid 1960s 8 storey apartment buildings were raised, along with the Prunaru market next to the stadium. It wasn't until the 1980s when mass demolition commenced, replacing old houses with standardised apartment blocks. Nowadays only a few houses remain standing as the neighborhood is dominated by these apartment buildings.

== Notable landmarks ==
The Giulesti Stadium (officially "Rapid Arena") is the home of Rapid București football club.

- Giulești Stadium
- Giulești Theatre
- Podul Grant
- Grivița Railway Yards
- Lacul Morii
