= Romanian architecture =

Romanian architecture includes medieval, pre-World War I, interwar, postwar, and contemporary 21st century architecture. In Romania, there are also regional differences with regard to architectural styles. Architecture, as the rest of the arts, was highly influenced by the socio-economic context and by the historical situation. For example, during the reign of King Carol I (1866–1914), Romania was in a continuous state of reorganization and modernization. In consequence, most of the architecture was designed by architects trained in Western European academies, particularly the École des Beaux-Arts, and a big part of the downtowns of the Romanian Old Kingdom were built during this period.

== Peasant ==
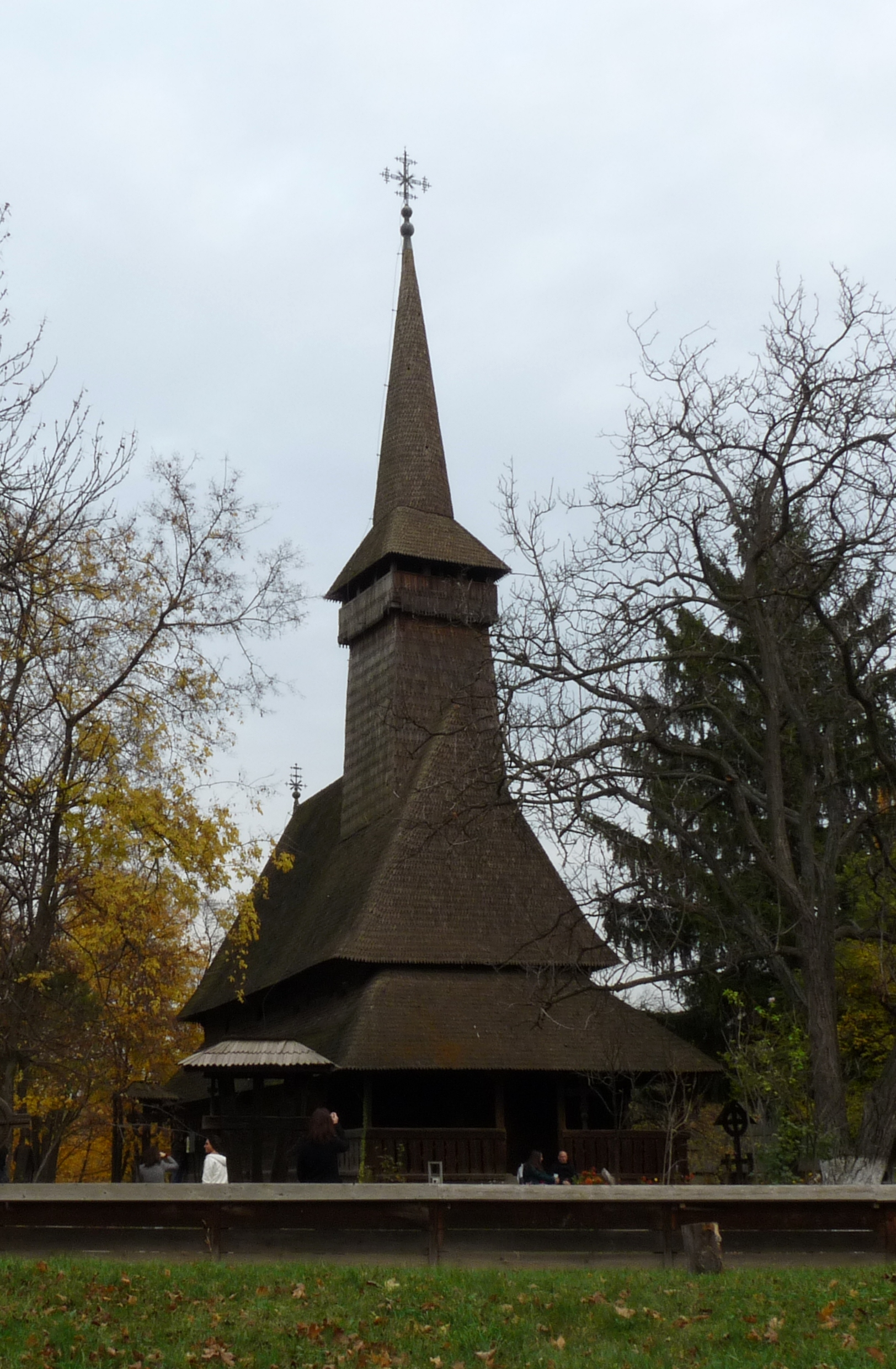
Wooden church from Dragomirești, Maramureș County, now in the Dimitrie Gusti National Village Museum, Bucharest, unknown architect, 1722

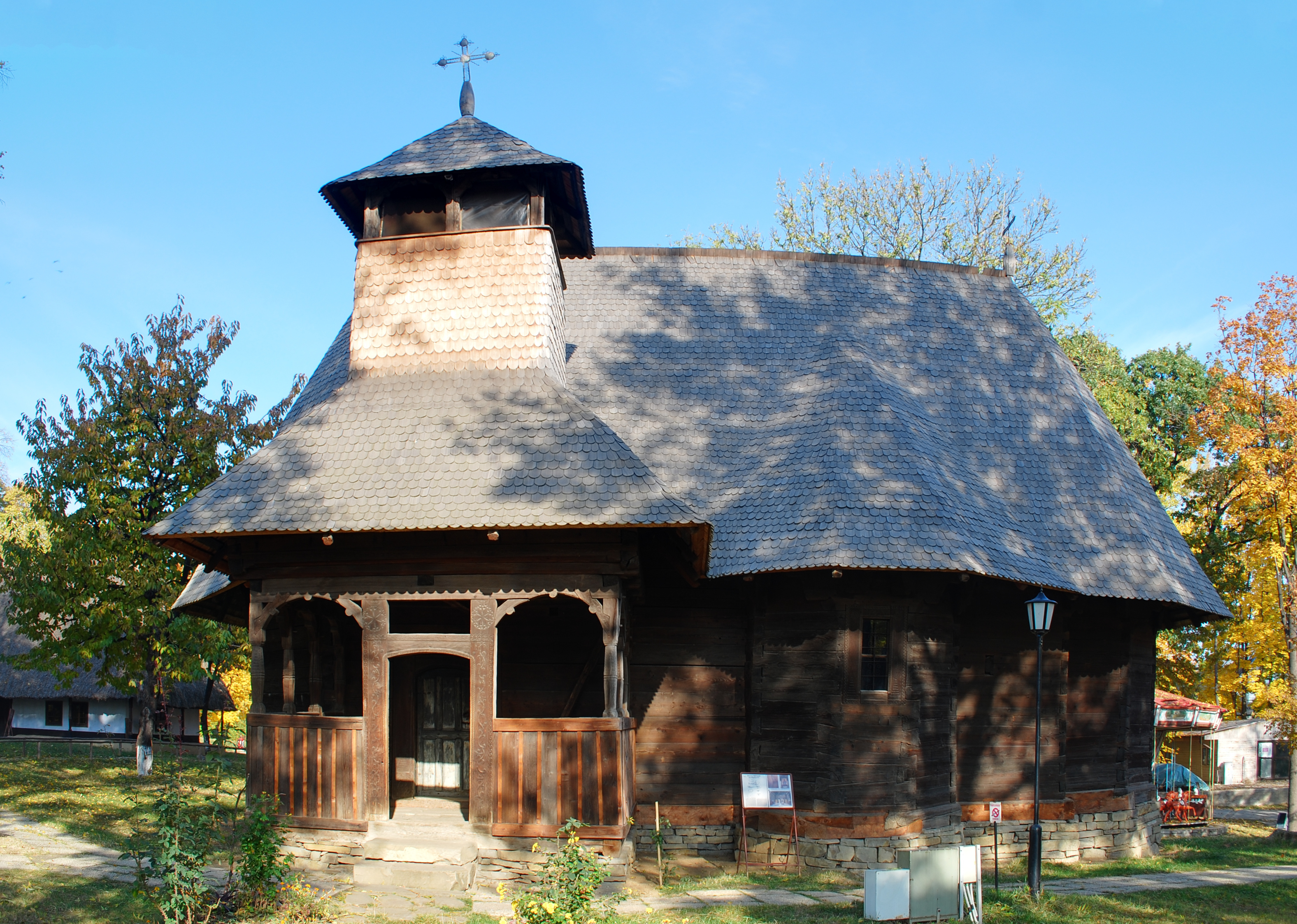
Wooden church from Ceahlău, Neamț County, now in the Dimitrie Gusti National Village Museum, Bucharest, unknown architect, 1773

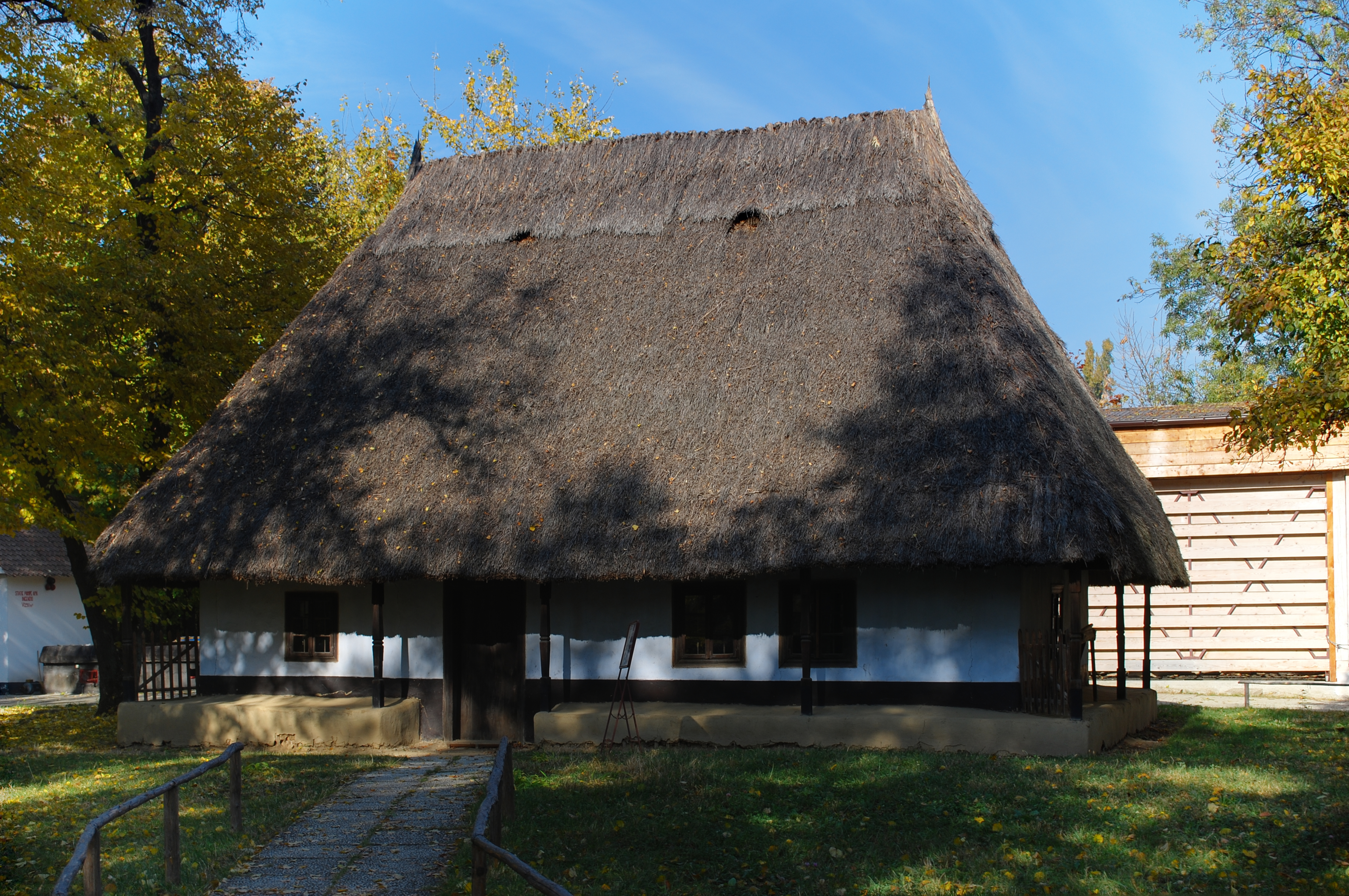
House from Dumbrăveni, Suceava County, now in the Dimitrie Gusti National Village Museum, unknown architect, 19th century

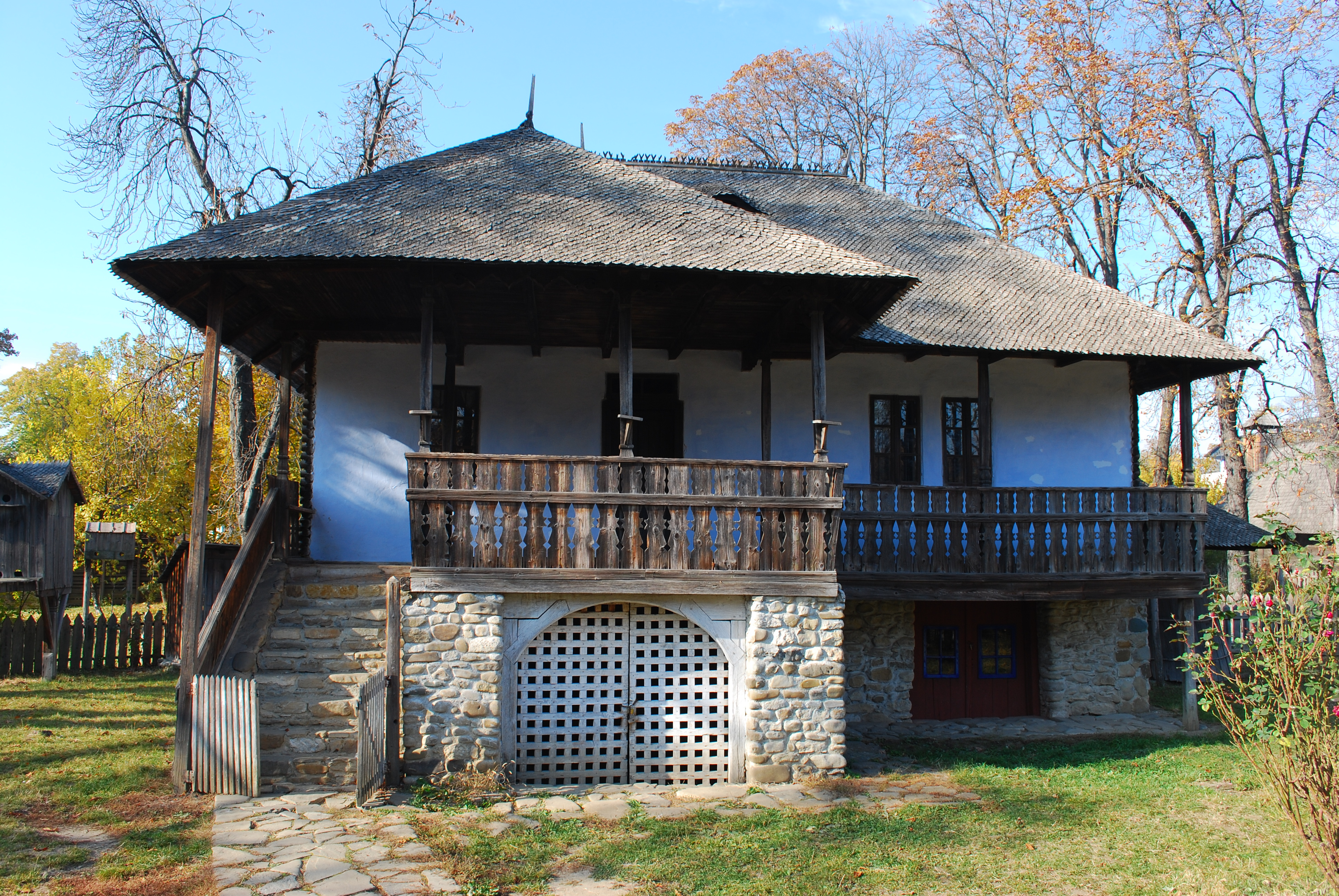
House from Chiojdu, Buzău County, now in the Dimitrie Gusti National Village Museum, unknown architect, 19th century

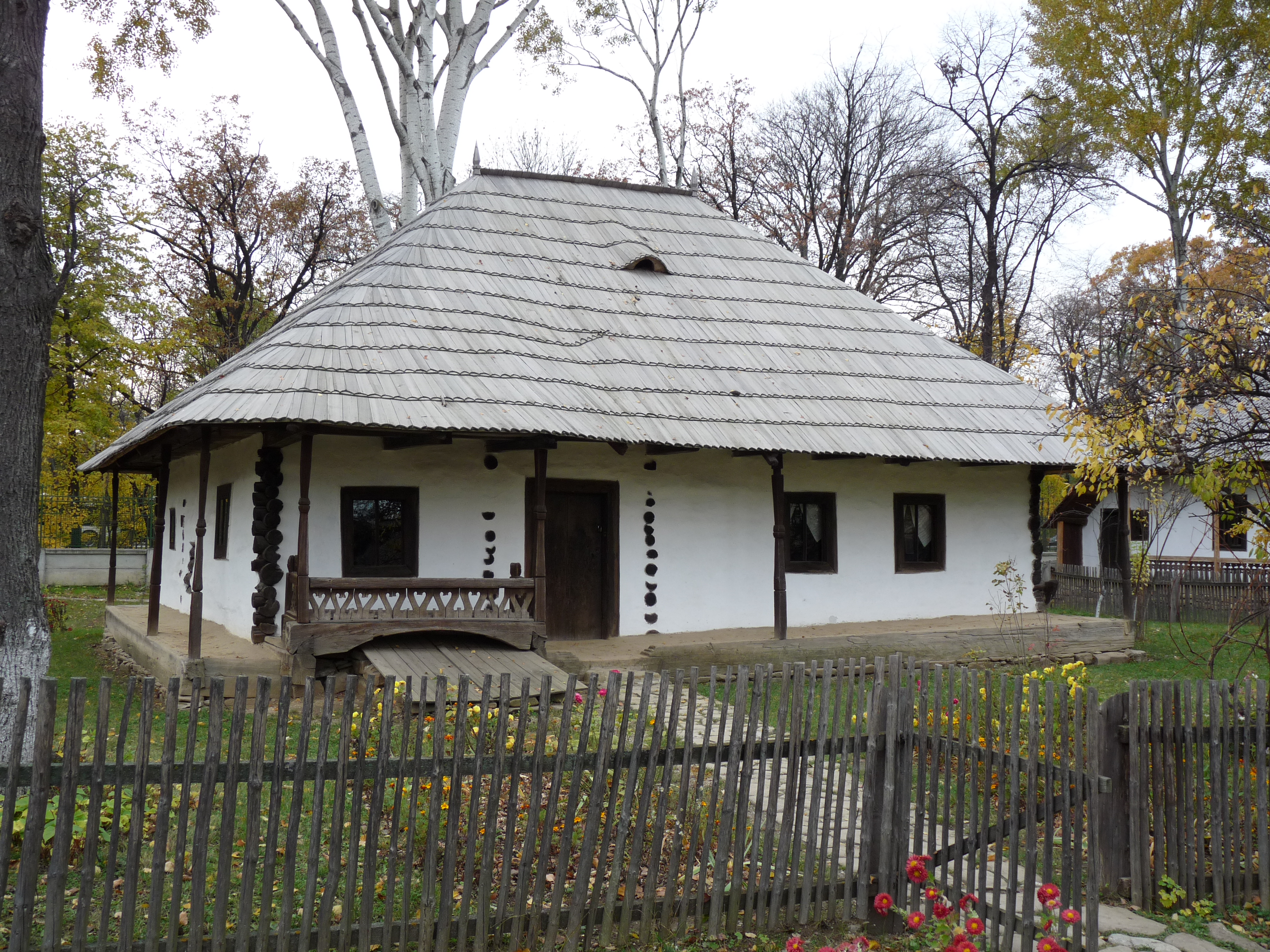
House from Hangu, Neamț County, now in the Dimitrie Gusti National Village Museum, unknown architect, 19th century

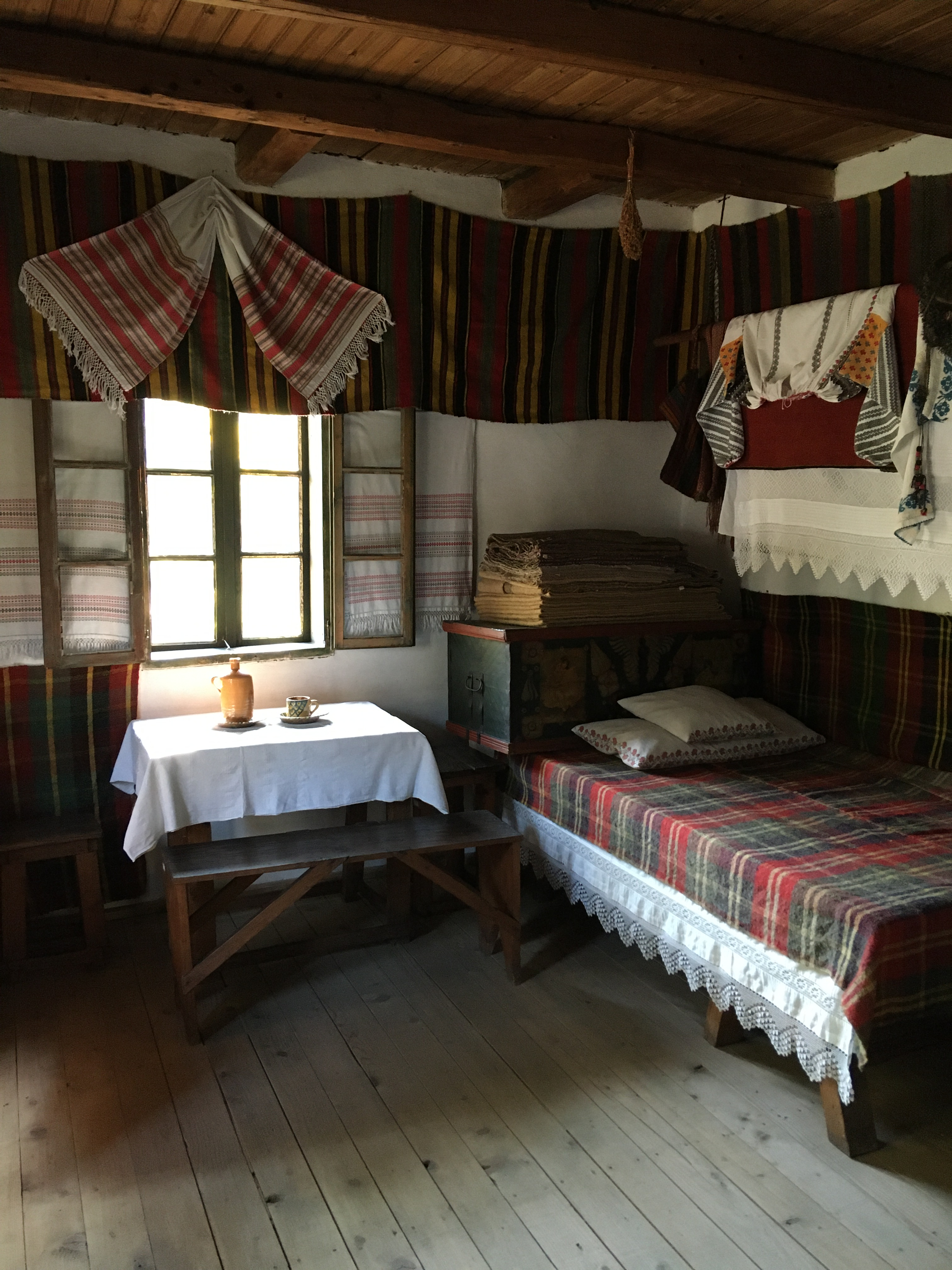
Interior of a peasant house from the Dimitrie Gusti National Village Museum

From the Middle Ages to the early 20th century, in Romania there were two types of construction that developed in parallel and different in point of both materials and technique. The first is peasant architecture, whose most spectacular achievements were the wooden churches, especially those in the villages of Maramureș, Banat and Apuseni Mountains, where the tradition is still carried out today. In Maramureș, in Surdești village, the 54 m high church tower built during 1721–1724 is among the highest of this kind in Europe. The second consists mainly of monasteries, as well as princely seats or boyar mansions. Most of the old lay edifices were destroyed by time, wars, earthquakes and fires.

Romanian peasant architecture was produced using perishable materials and simple techniques. Certain historical, social-economic and geographic factors led to it becoming different depending on regions and eras. In general, a peasant house was made of 2, 3 or 4 rooms, each having a particular purpose. The most important room was the one in which the family spent their everyday life, often also called «cameră a focului» (fire room), because here is the stove. Another chamber is known as «tindă», most often used for passing. A room for keeping food and clothes is placed in different positions, sometimes having separate entry, or even being an independent structure. The 4th room, when it existed, was «camera curată» (the clean room), furnished and decorated in a special way. Used only for guests, it was used for storing valuable goods or the girls' dowry. The porch (prispă) appears quite often in the plan of popular Romanian dwellings. Because of the surrounding forests, peasant architecture develops mainly in wood. Primarily oak and fir, rarely beech and birch, were the main building materials, many times the only ones, which Romanian peasants used for building dwellings. Something that really influenced the exterior of a house was the roof, which was highly influenced both by existing materials and the climate of the region where it was built. At the beginning, it was exclusively made of long rye or wheat straws, or of reed in the swamp regions. Over time, towards the 17th and 18th centuries, the straws are replaced with shingle, very often set with wooden nails. Tiles and metal sheets appear quite late, being more expensive and harder to find materials.

== Medieval ==
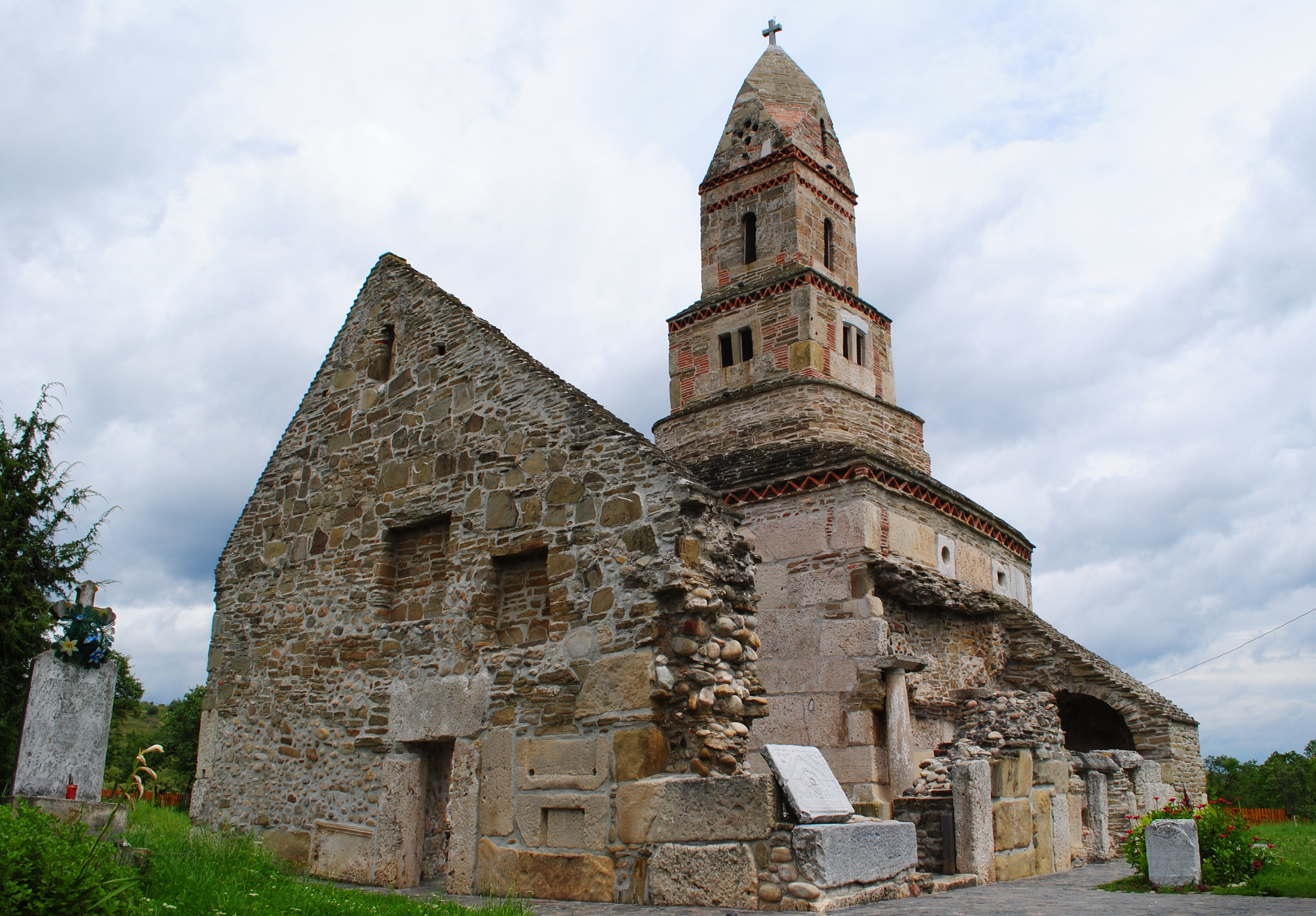
Densuș Church, Densuș, 13th century, unknown architect

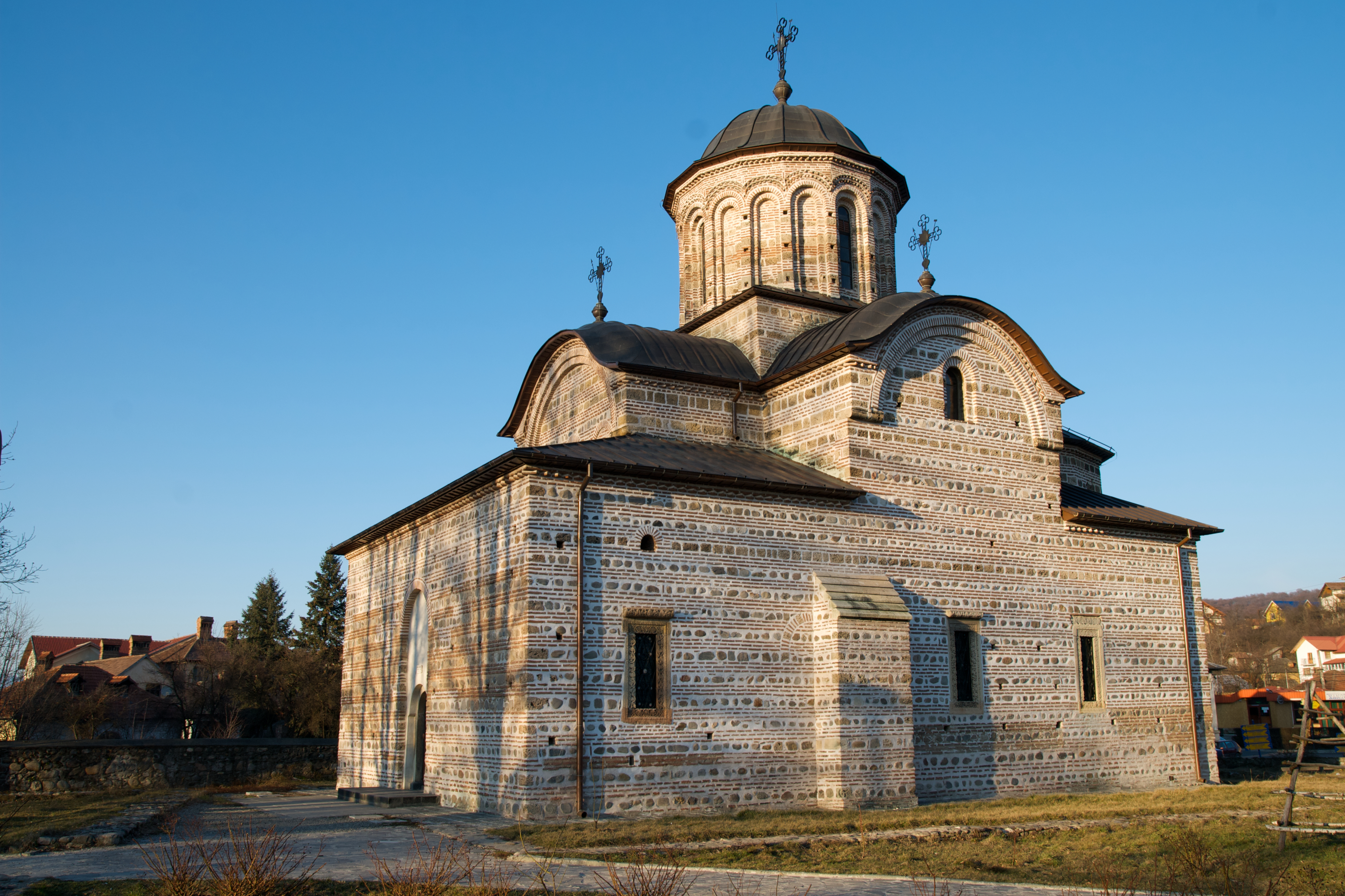
Princely Church of Saint Nicholas, Curtea de Argeș, 1352, unknown architect

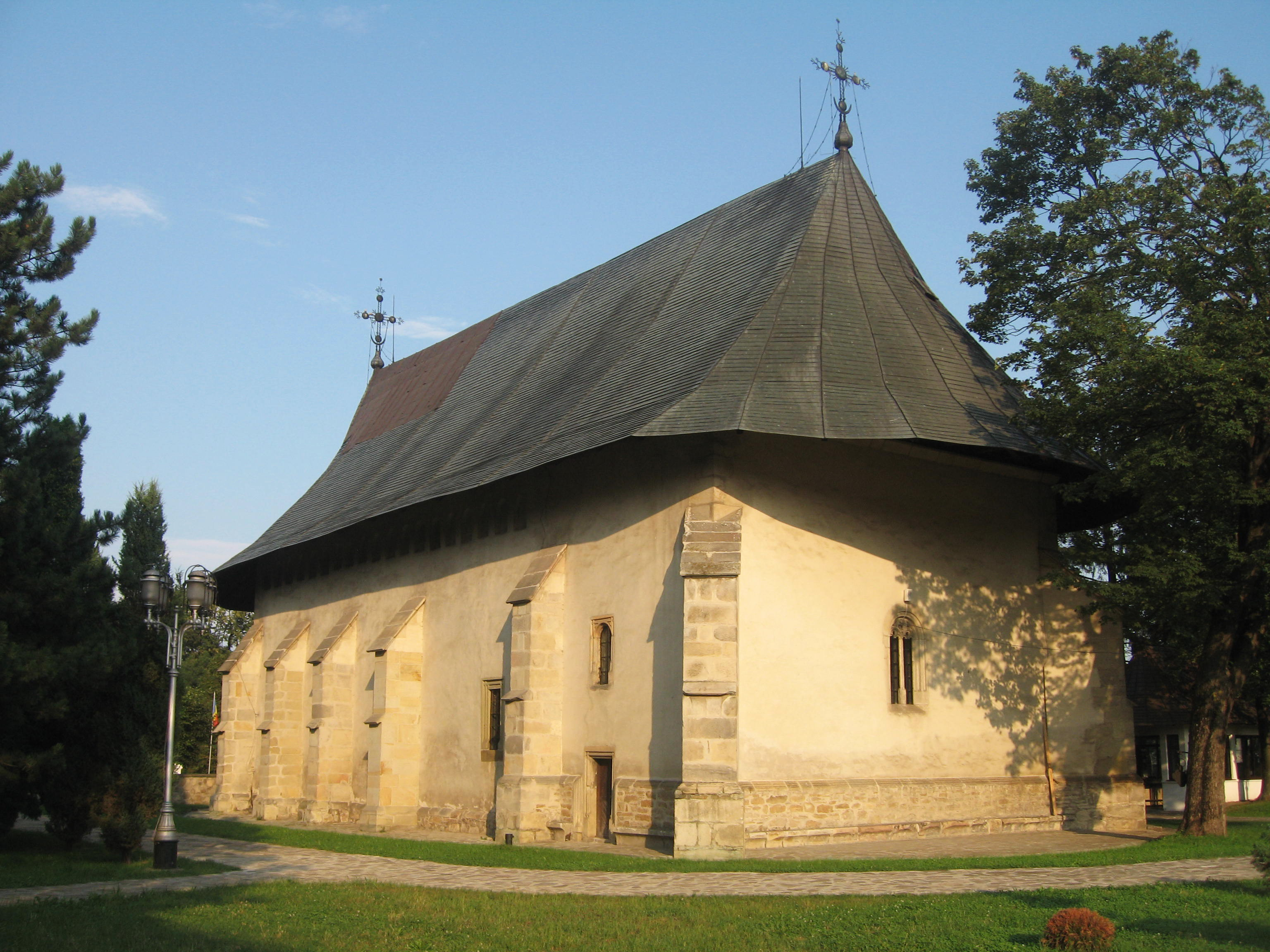
Saint Nicholas Church of the Bogdana Monastery, Rădăuți, probably since Bogdan I (1360), unknown architect

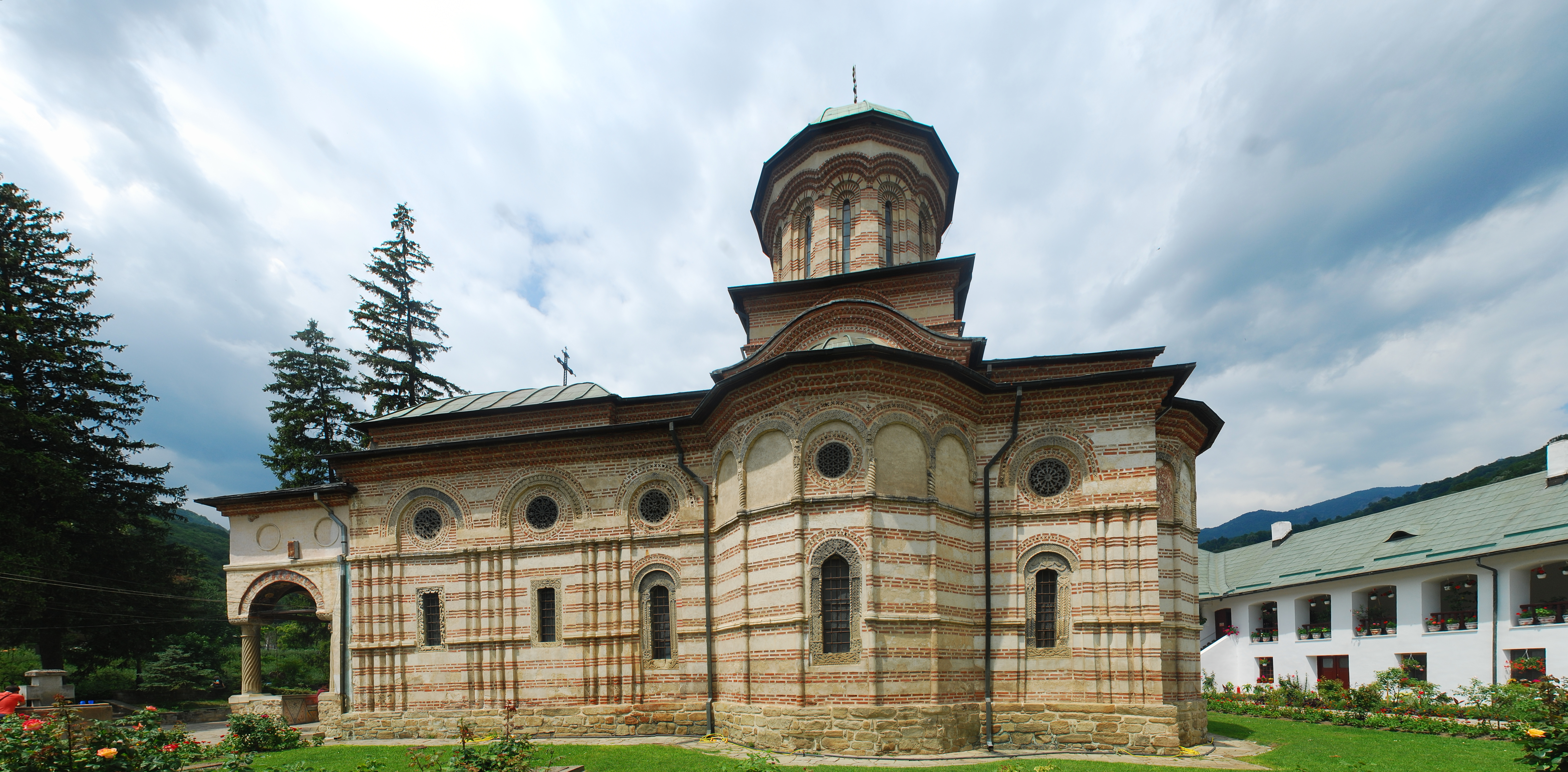
Cozia Monastery Church, Călimănești, 1387–1391, unknown architect

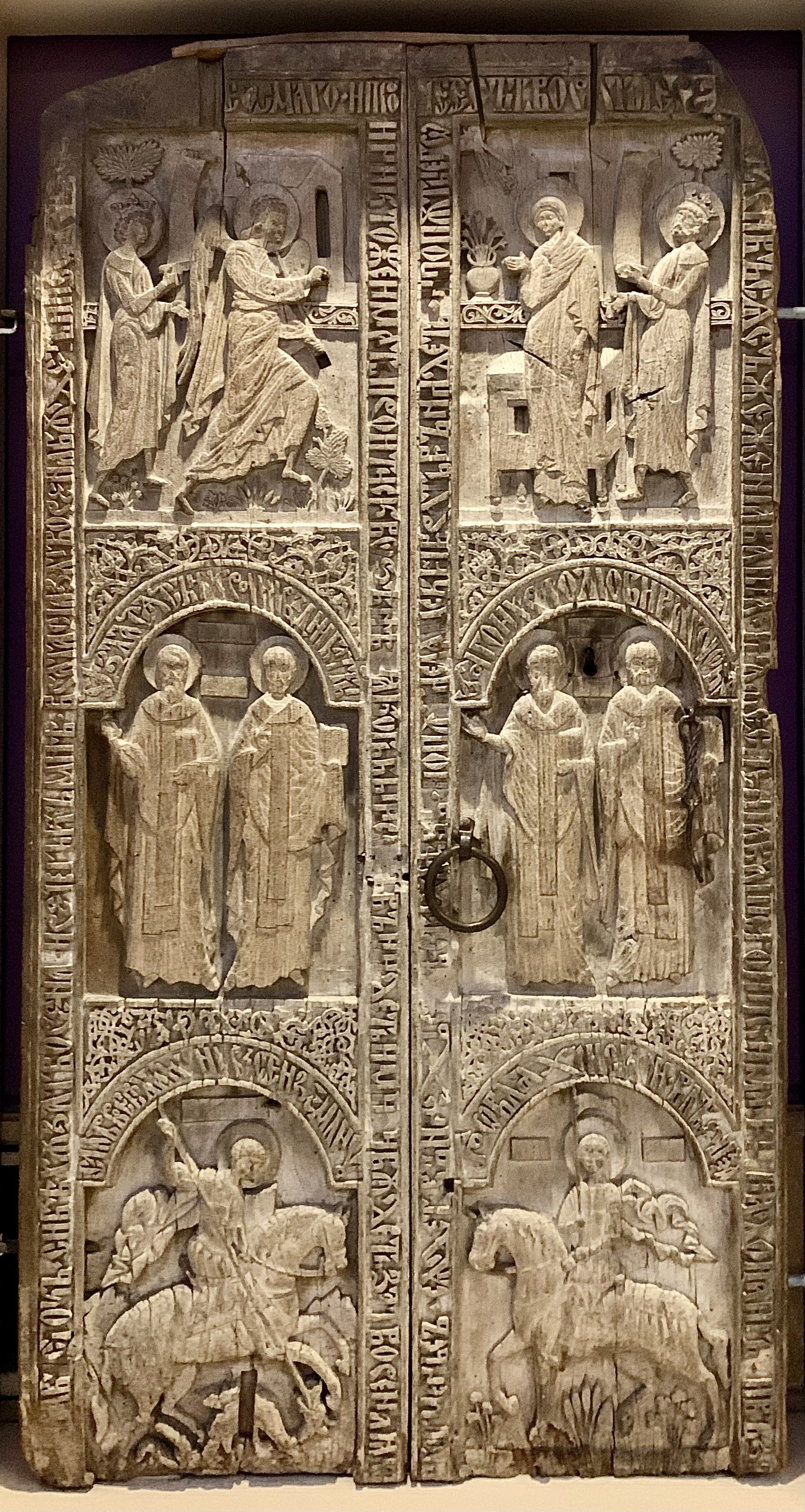
Church door, 1452–1453, unknown sculptor

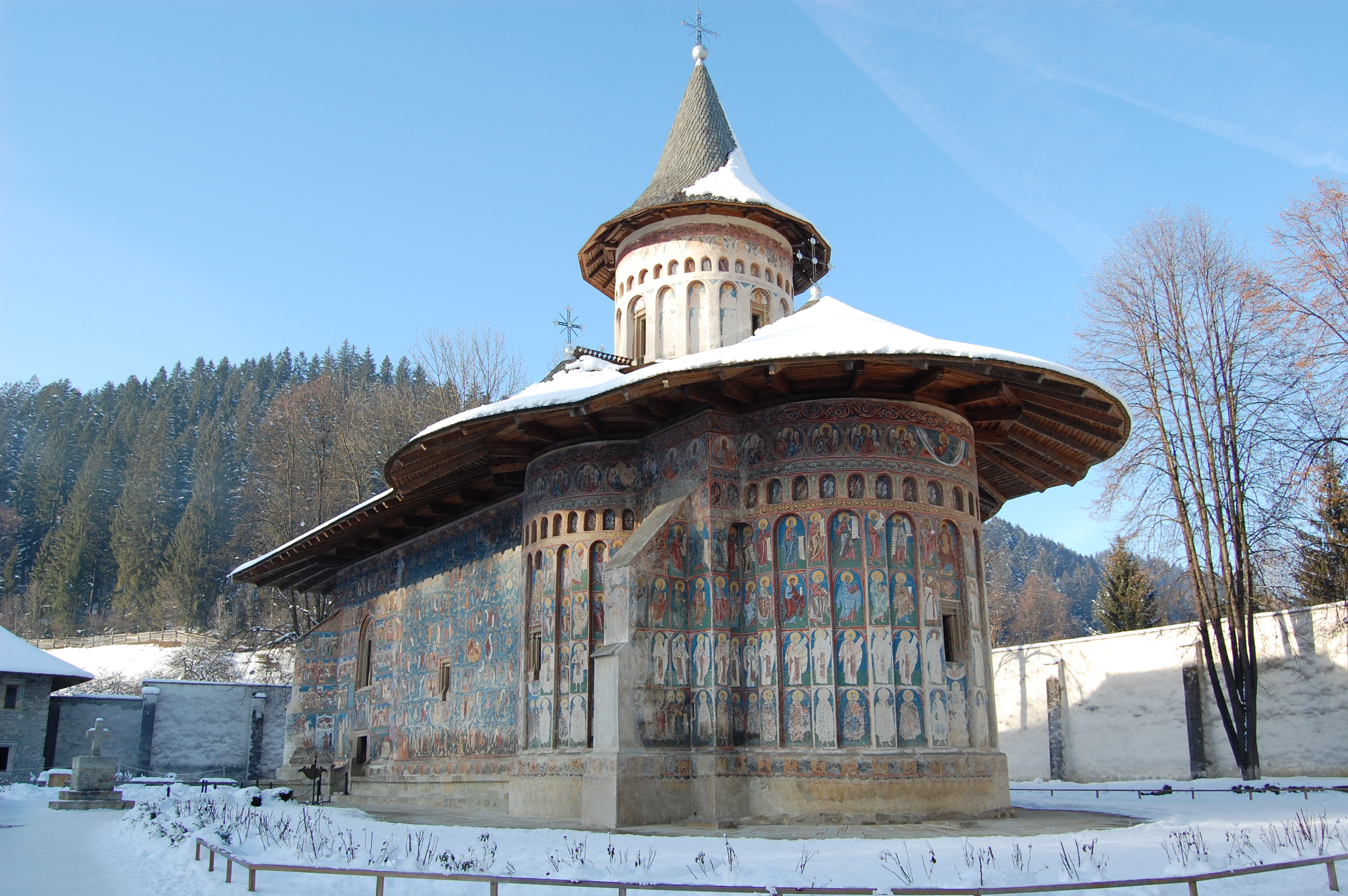
Saint George Church of the Voroneț Monastery, Suceava County, 1488, unknown architect

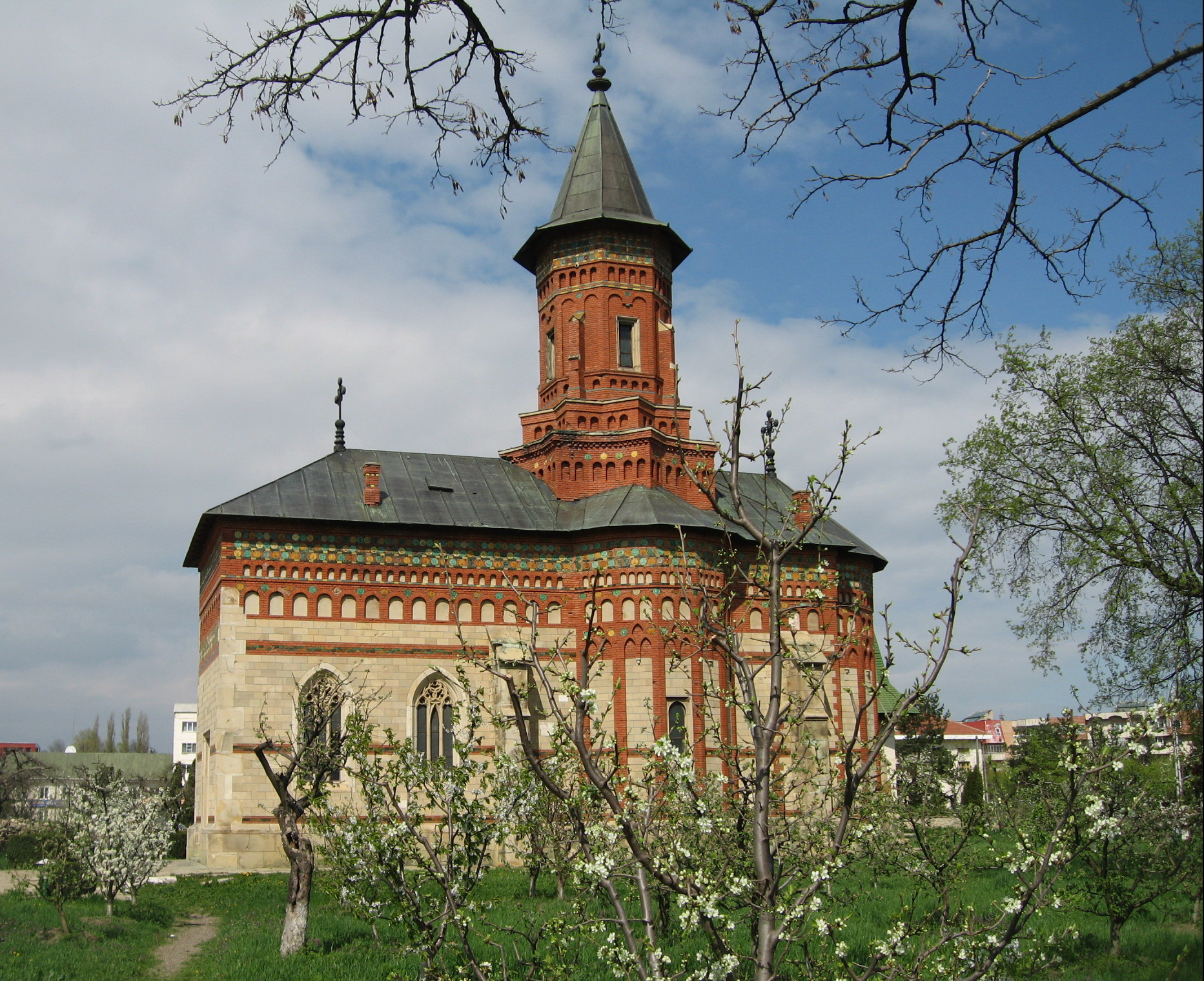
Saint George Church, Hârlău, 1492, unknown architect

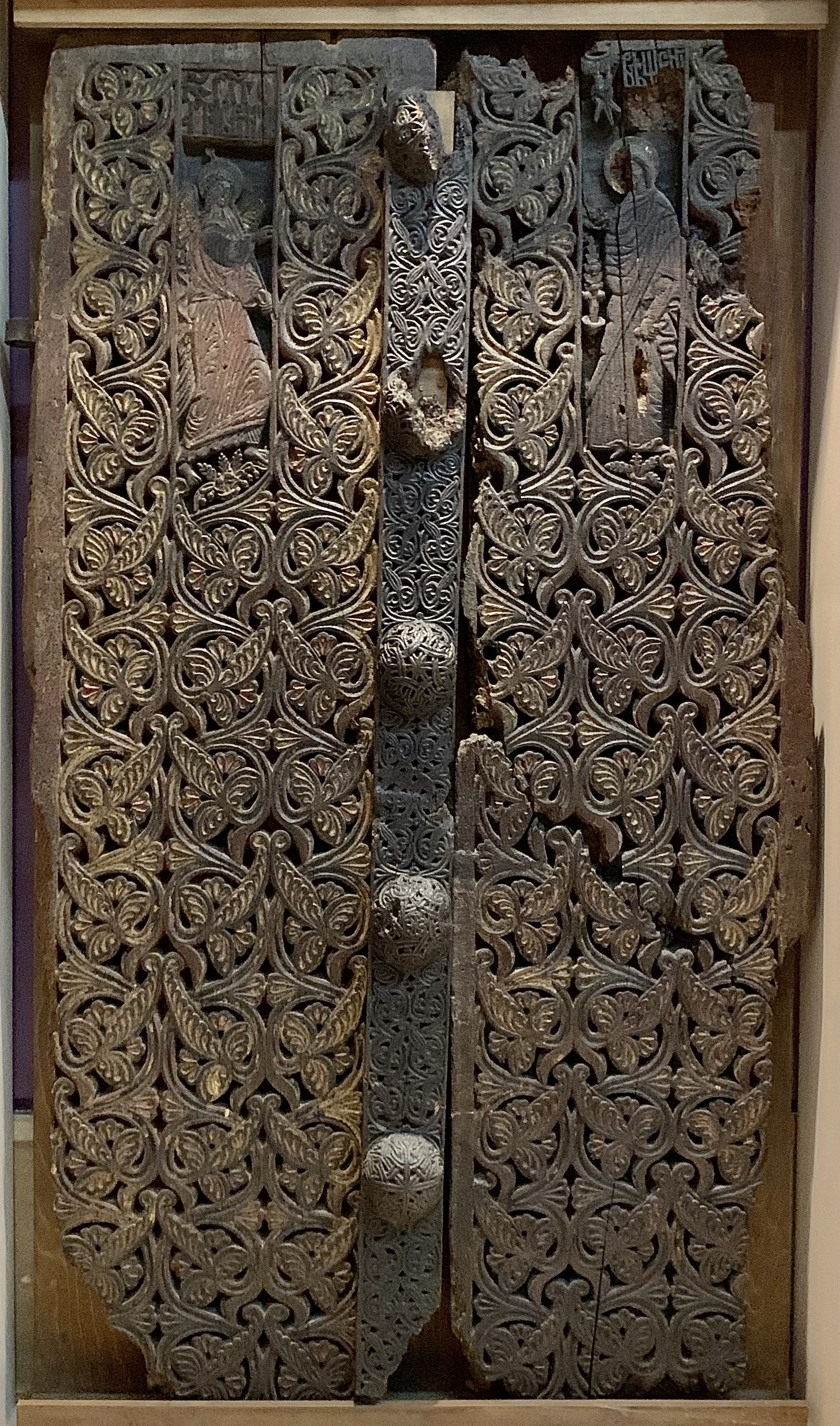
Church door, first half of the 16th century, unknown sculptor

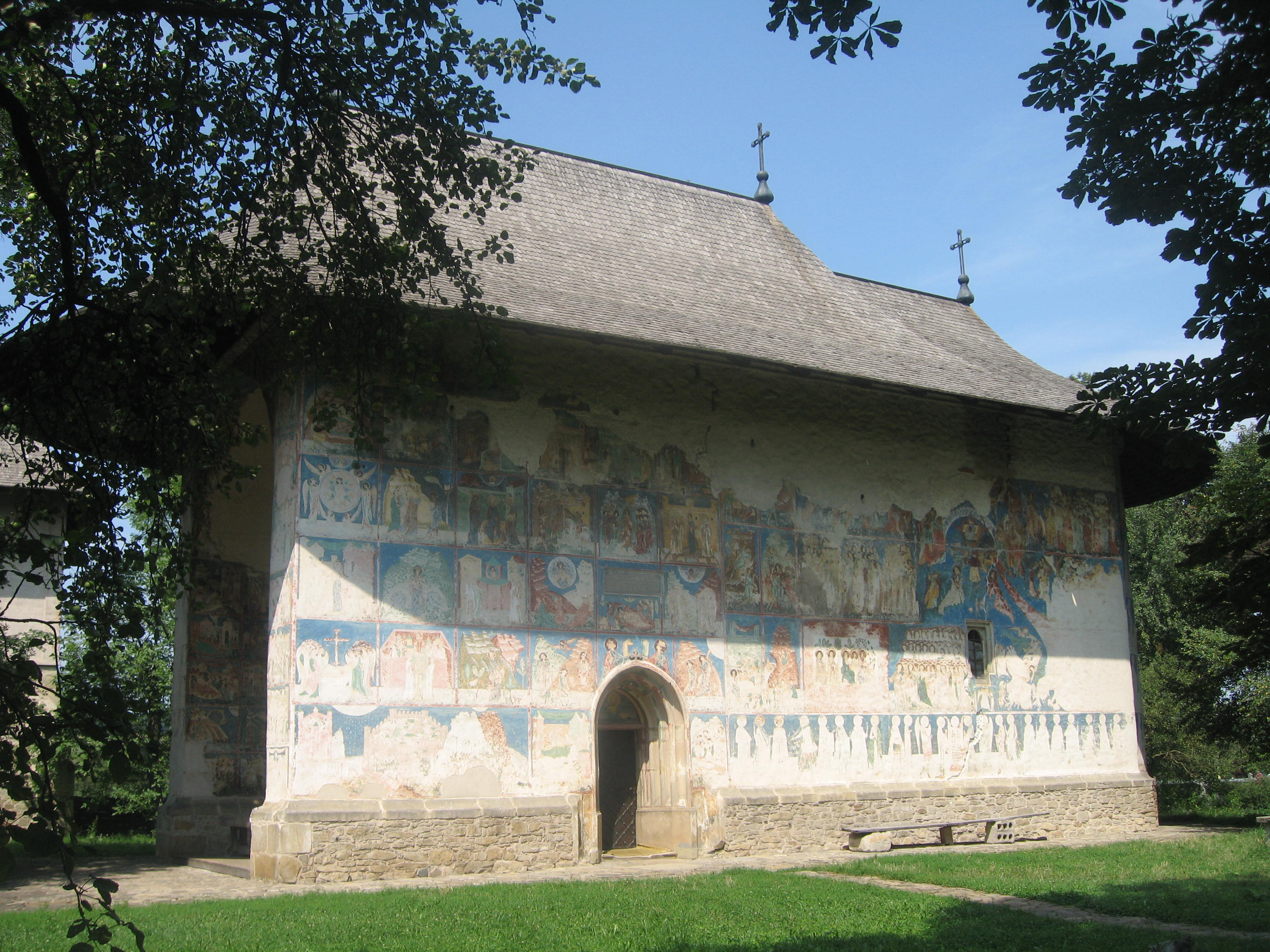
Arbore Church, Arbore, 1503, unknown architect

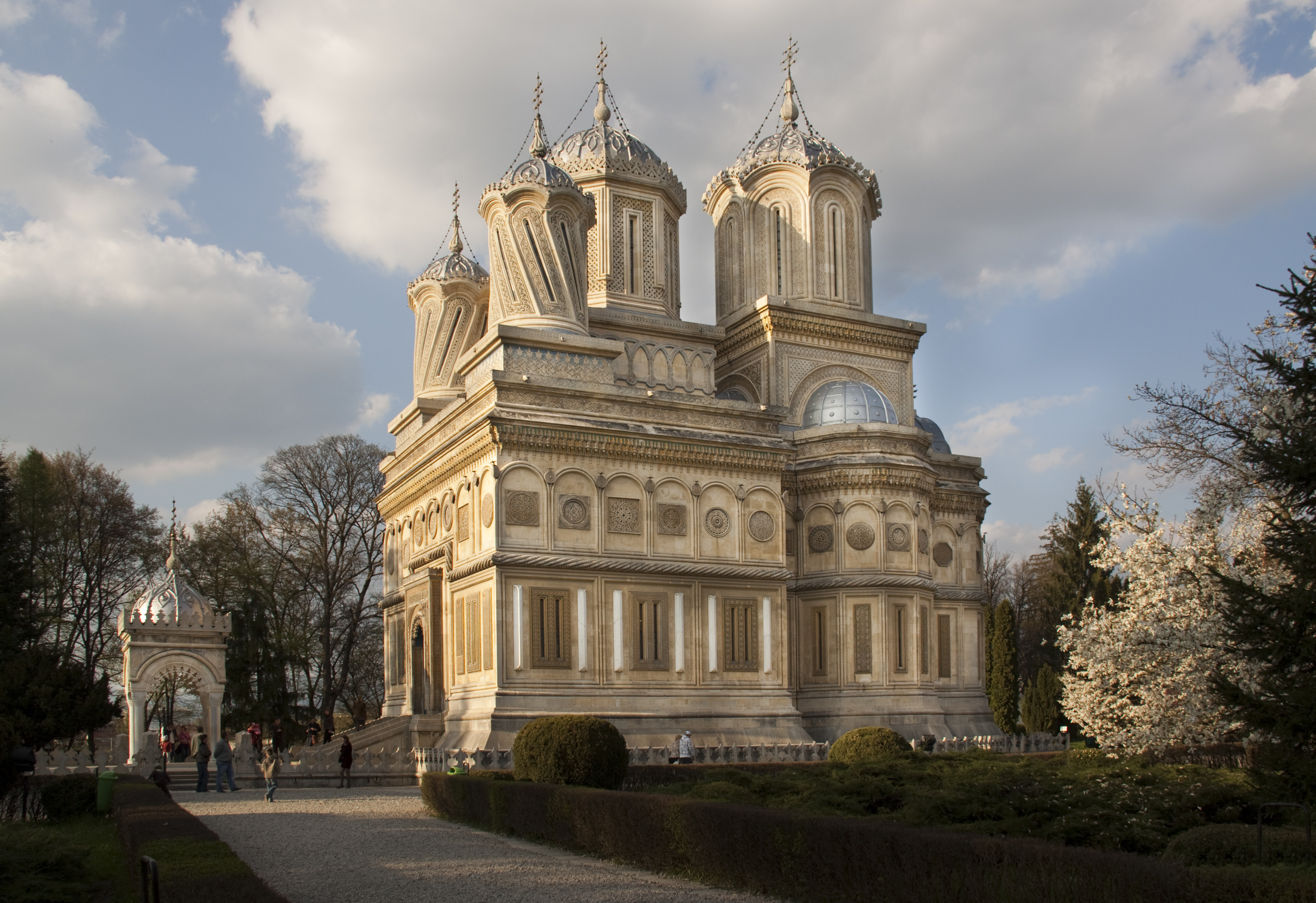
Curtea de Argeș Cathedral, Curtea de Argeș, 1517, unknown architect

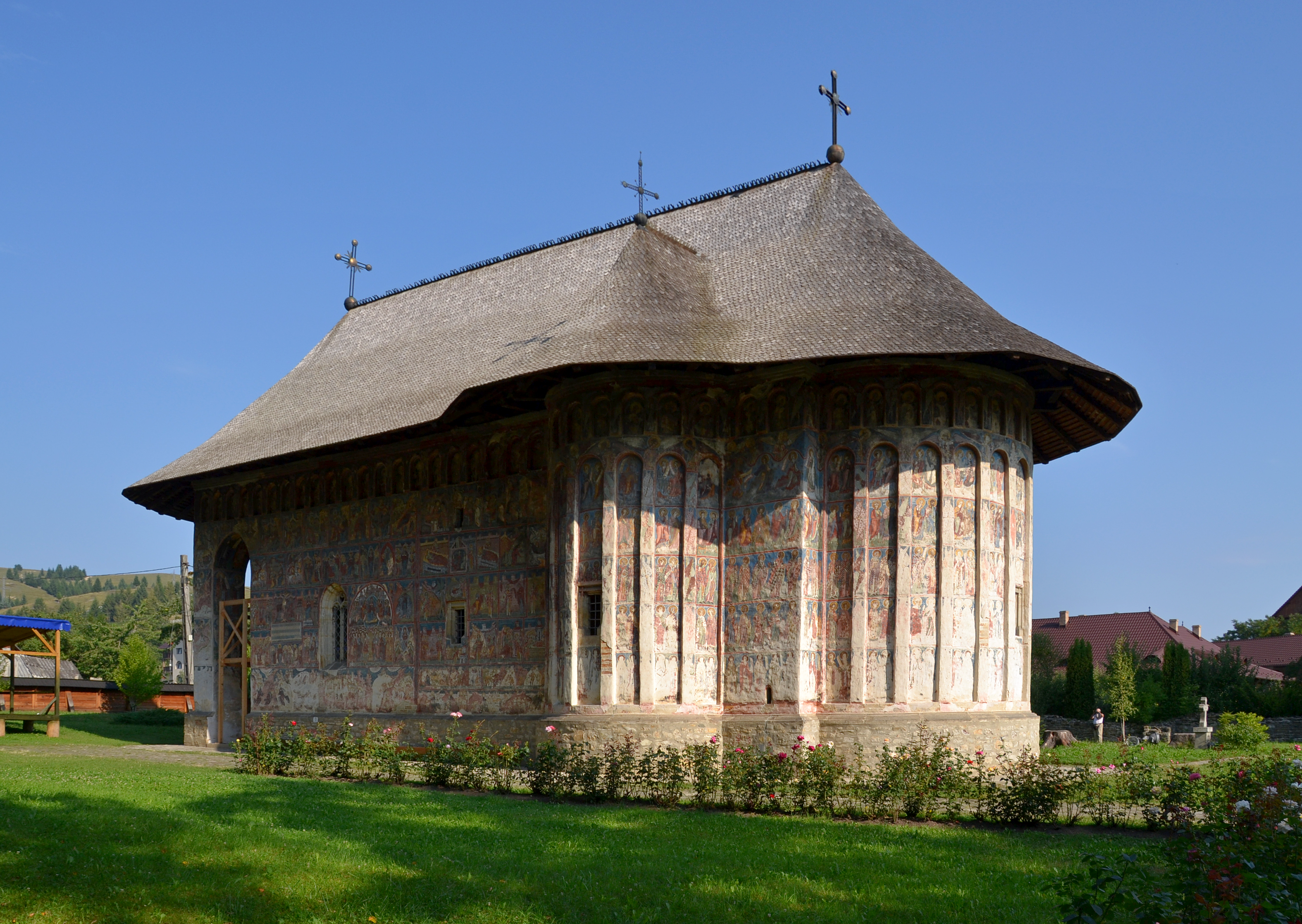
Humor Monastery Church, Mănăstirea Humorului, 1530, unknown architect

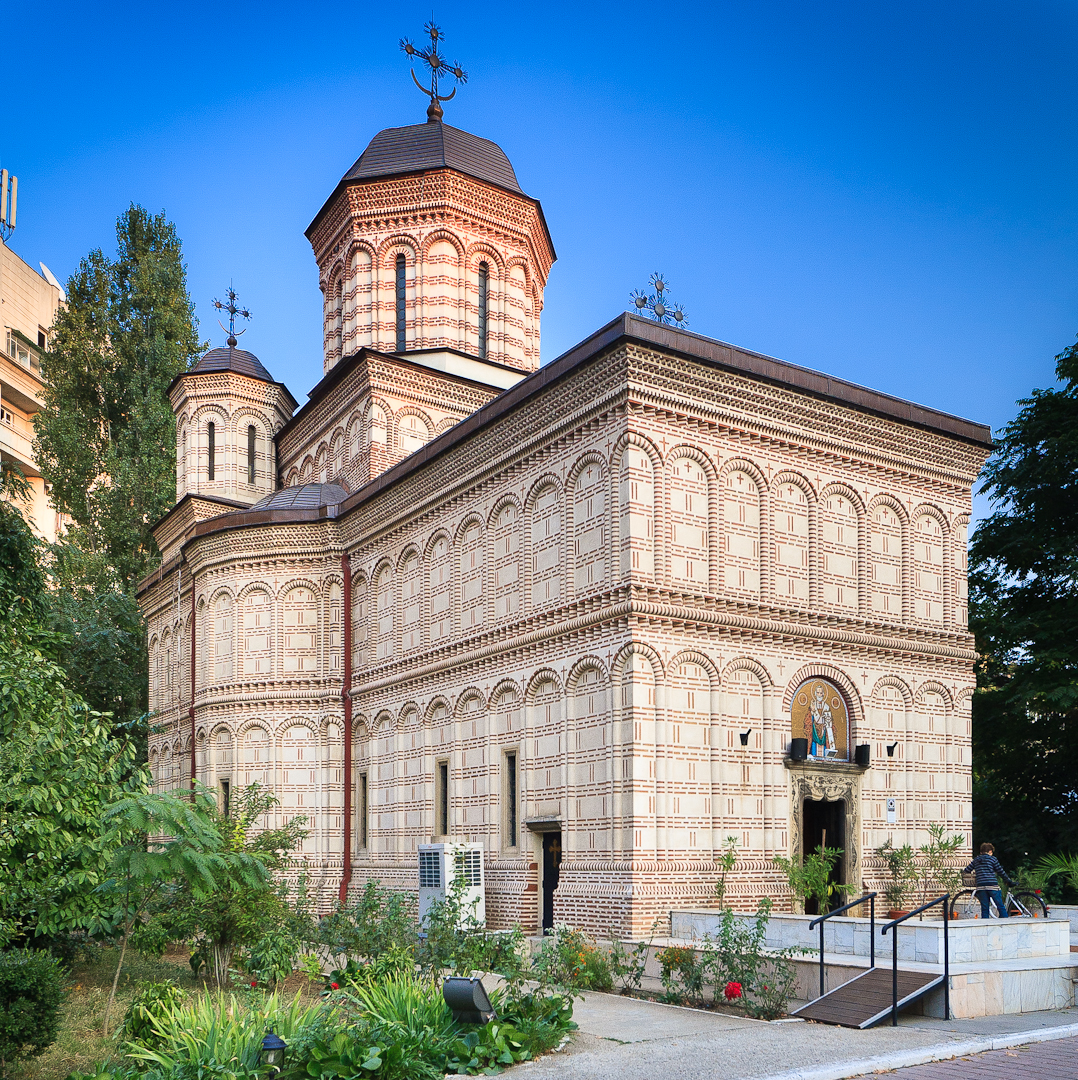
Church of the Mihai Vodă Monastery, Bucharest, 1589, unknown architect

All over Europe, the beginnings of the Middle Ages are marked by the decline of the urban life that characterized the Roman Empire. In Western Europe, the cities that survive are those with political or administrative functions. Unlike how it is in Western Europe, in the Romanian areas, after the end of the Roman structures, urban life completely disappears. Romanian cities develop differently in Wallachia and Moldavia compared to the Western ones, including those from Transylvania, being more of some big villages than cities.

In mediaeval architecture, influences of Western trends can be traced, to a greater or lesser extent, in all the three lands inhabited by Romanians. Such influences are stronger in Transylvania, and weaker in Moldavia, in forms absorbed by local and Byzantine tradition. In Wallachia, Western elements in architecture were even fewer; there, from the 14th-century architecture was based on the local adaptation of the Byzantine model (the Princely Church in Curtea de Arges and the Cozia Monastery).

There are monuments significant for the Transylvanian Gothic style preserved to this day, in spite of all alterations, such as the Black Church in Brașov (14th and 15th centuries) and a number of other cathedrals, as well as the Bran Castle in Brașov County (14th century), the Hunyad Castle in Hunedoara (15th century).

Transylvania also developed fortified towns extensively during the Middle Ages; their urban growth respected principles of functionality (the usual pattern is a central market place with a church, narrow streets with sides linked here and there by archways): the cities of Sighișoara, Sibiu and Brașov are remarkable examples in that sense. Building greatly developed in Moldavia, too. A great number of fortresses were built or rebuilt during the reign of Moldavia's greatest prince, Stephen the Great (1457–1504). Suceava, Neamț, Hotin, Soroca and others were raised and successfully withstood the sieges laid in the course of time by Sultan Mehmet II, the conqueror of Constantinople .

It was during his time that the Moldavian style, of great originality and stylistic unity, developed, by blending Gothic elements with the Byzantine structure specific to the churches. Among such constructions, the monumental church of the Neamț Monastery served, for more than a century, as a model for Moldavian churches and monasteries. The style was continued in the 16th century, during the rule of Stephen the Great's son, Petru Rareș (1527–1538, 1541–1546). The main innovation was the porch and the outwall paintings (the churches of Voroneț, Sucevița, Moldovița monasteries). These churches of Northern Moldavia have become famous worldwide, due to the beauty of their painted elegant shapes that can be seen from afar.

== Renaissance ==
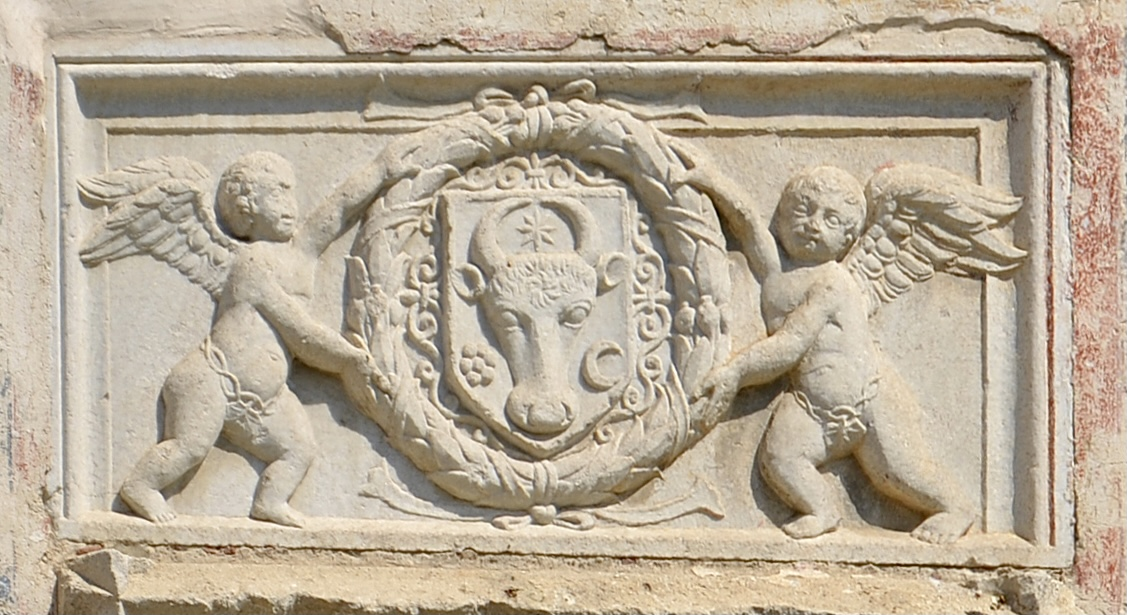
Relief with the coat of arms of Moldavia in a laurel wreath hold by two cherubs (aka putti), above the pisanie of the Saint Demetrius of Thessaloniki Church, Suceava, unknown sculptor, 1534

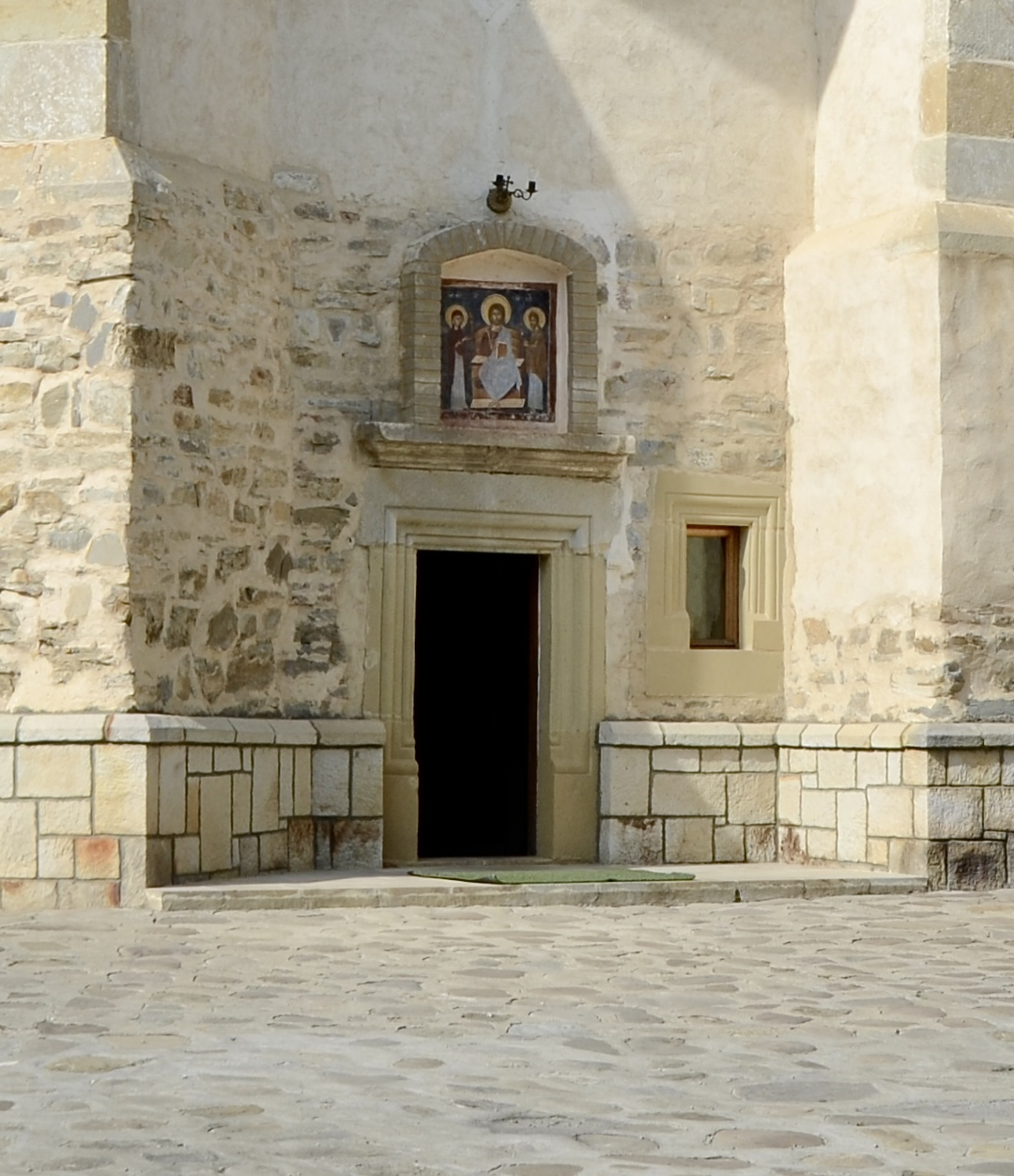
Renaissance-influenced door and window stone frames, of the Pângărați Monastery Church, Pângărați, Romania, unknown sculptor or architect, 1552-1558

In Moldavia, some buildings have Renaissance influences. The facade of the Golia Monastery Church is decorated with Corinthian pilasters, and the windows have pediments above them. The Saint Demetrius of Thessaloniki Church in Suceava has a relief with the coat of arms of Moldavia in a laurel wreath held by two cherubs (aka putti), above the pisanie. Some boyar houses and certain tomb stones were also influenced by Renaissance architecture.

== 17th and 18th centuries ==
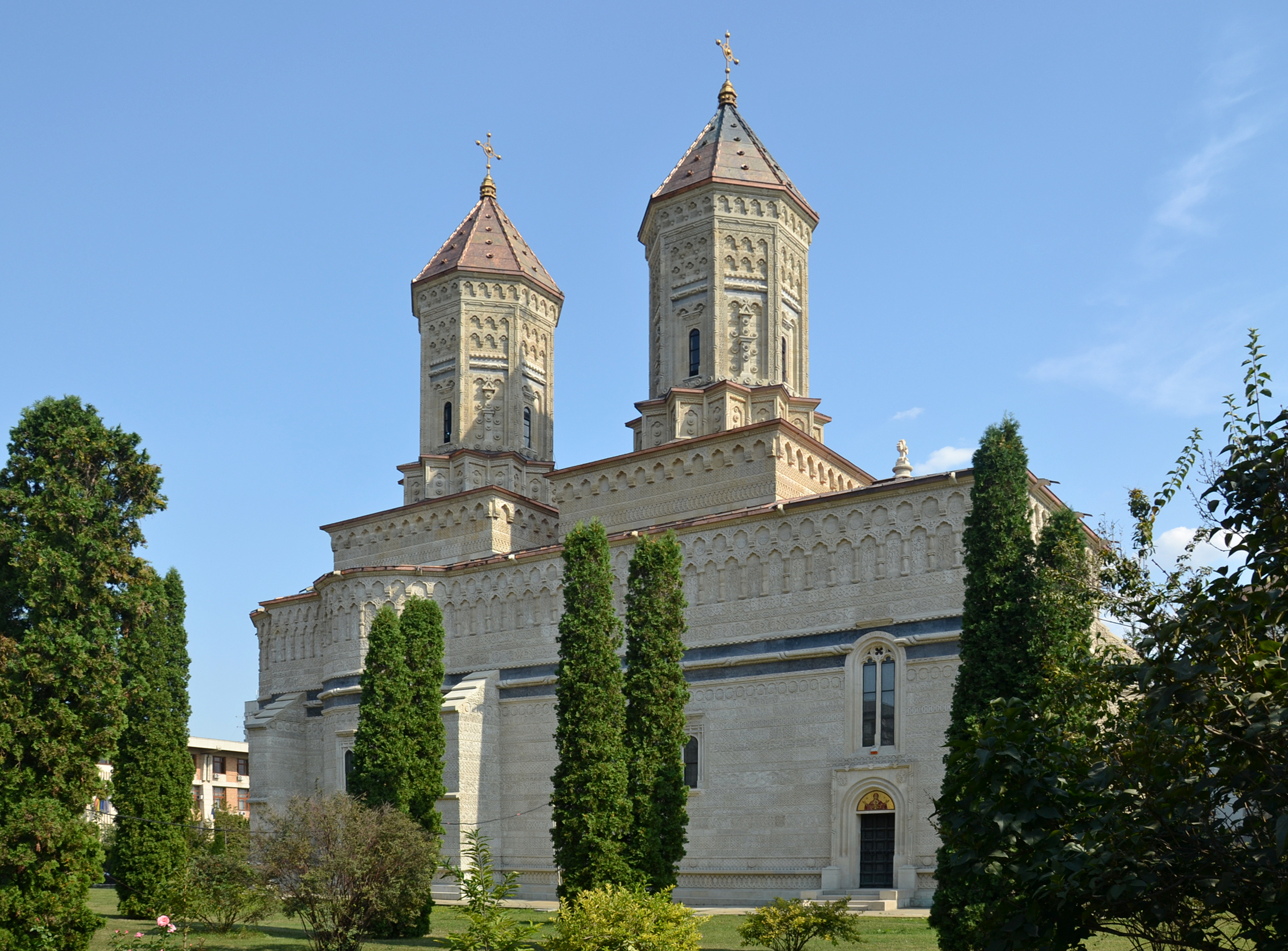
Trei Ierarhi Monastery Church of Iași, Moldavia, unknown architect, built totally or partially by a team of Georgian masters, 1637-1639

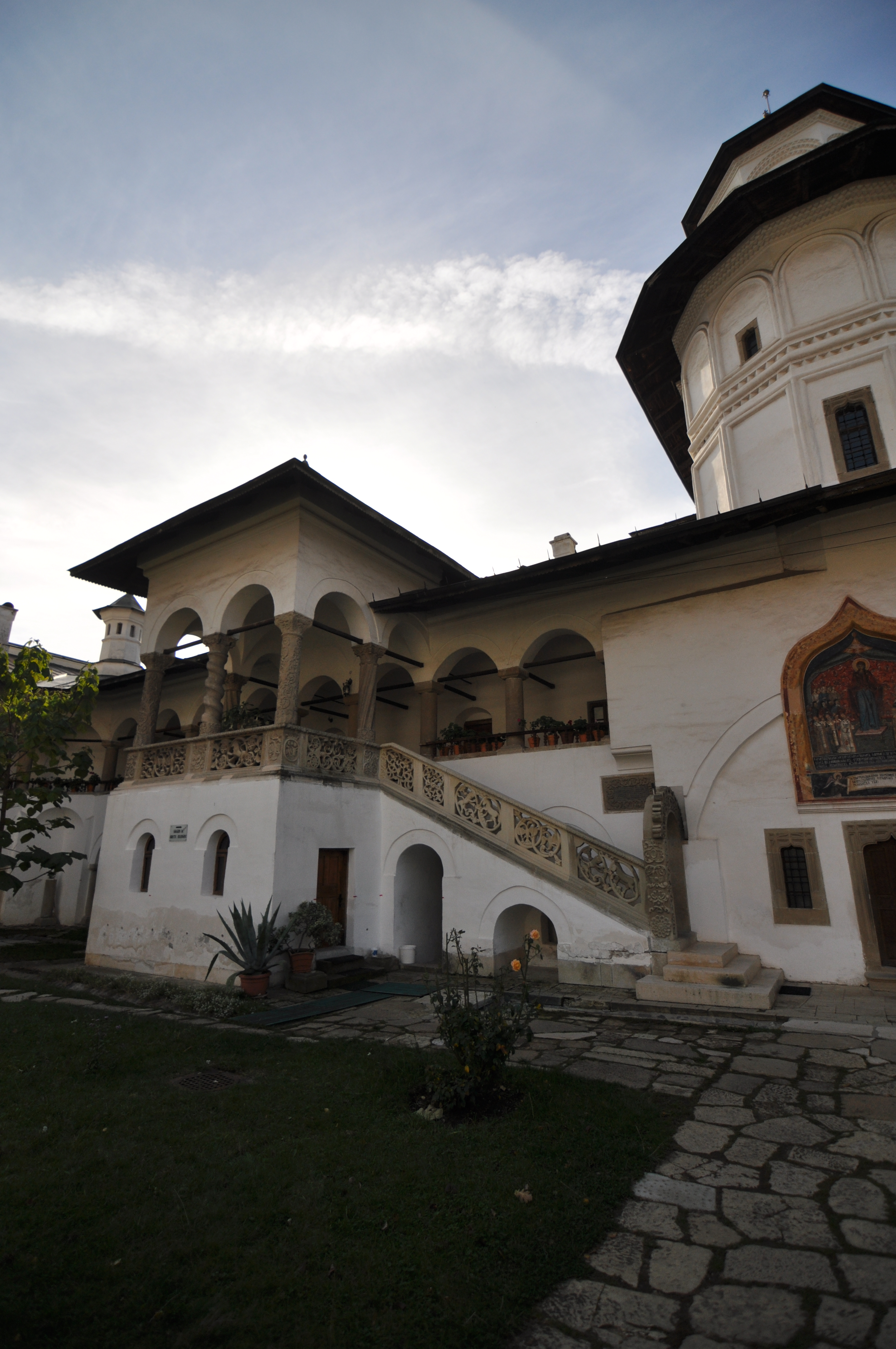
Horezu Monastery from Oltenia, unknown architect, 17th-18th centuries

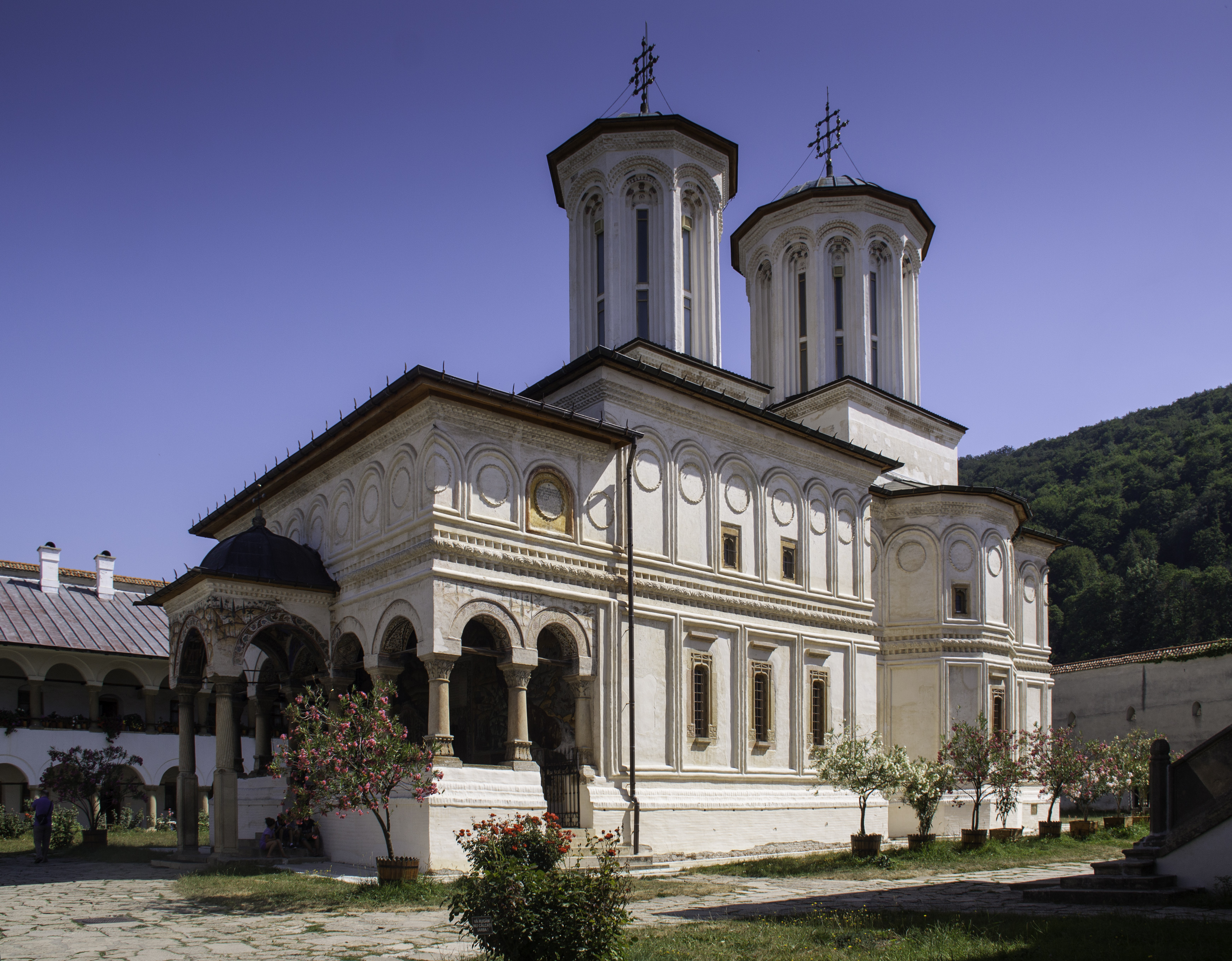
Horezu Monastery church, unknown architect, 1693

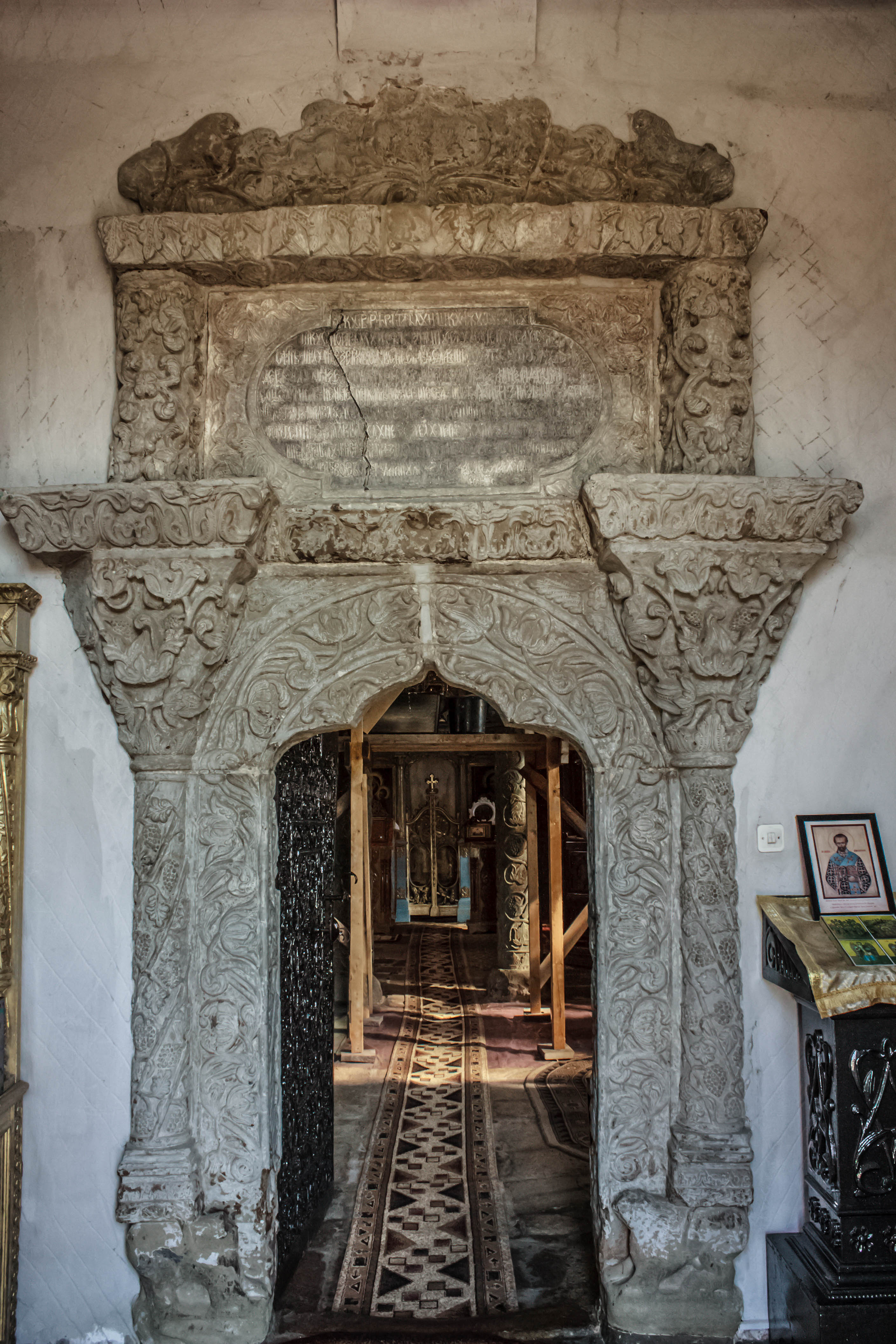
Door frame from the Archangels Church of Berca, Muntenia, unknown architect and sculptor, 1694

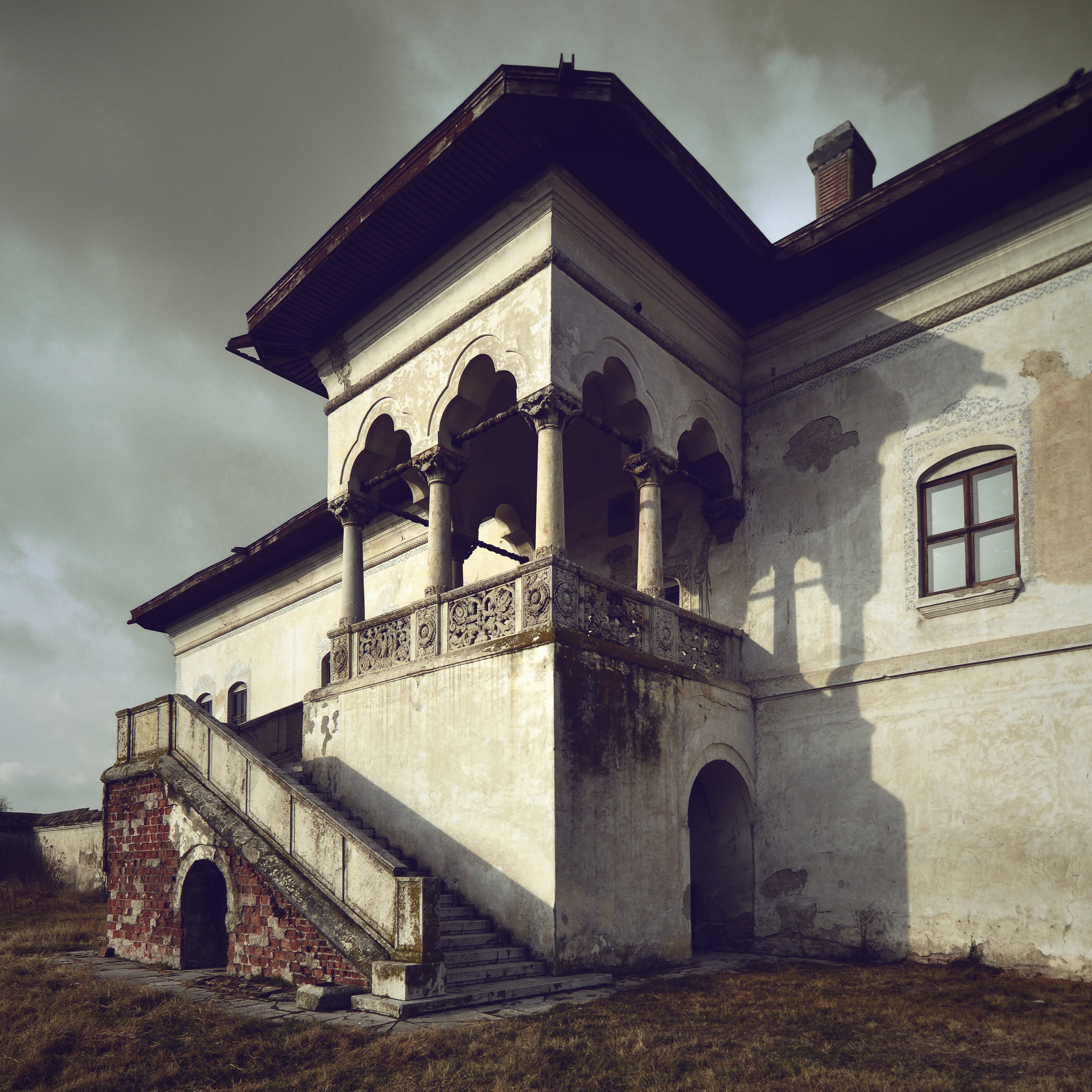
Potlogi Palace, Potlogi, Muntenia, unknown architect, 1698

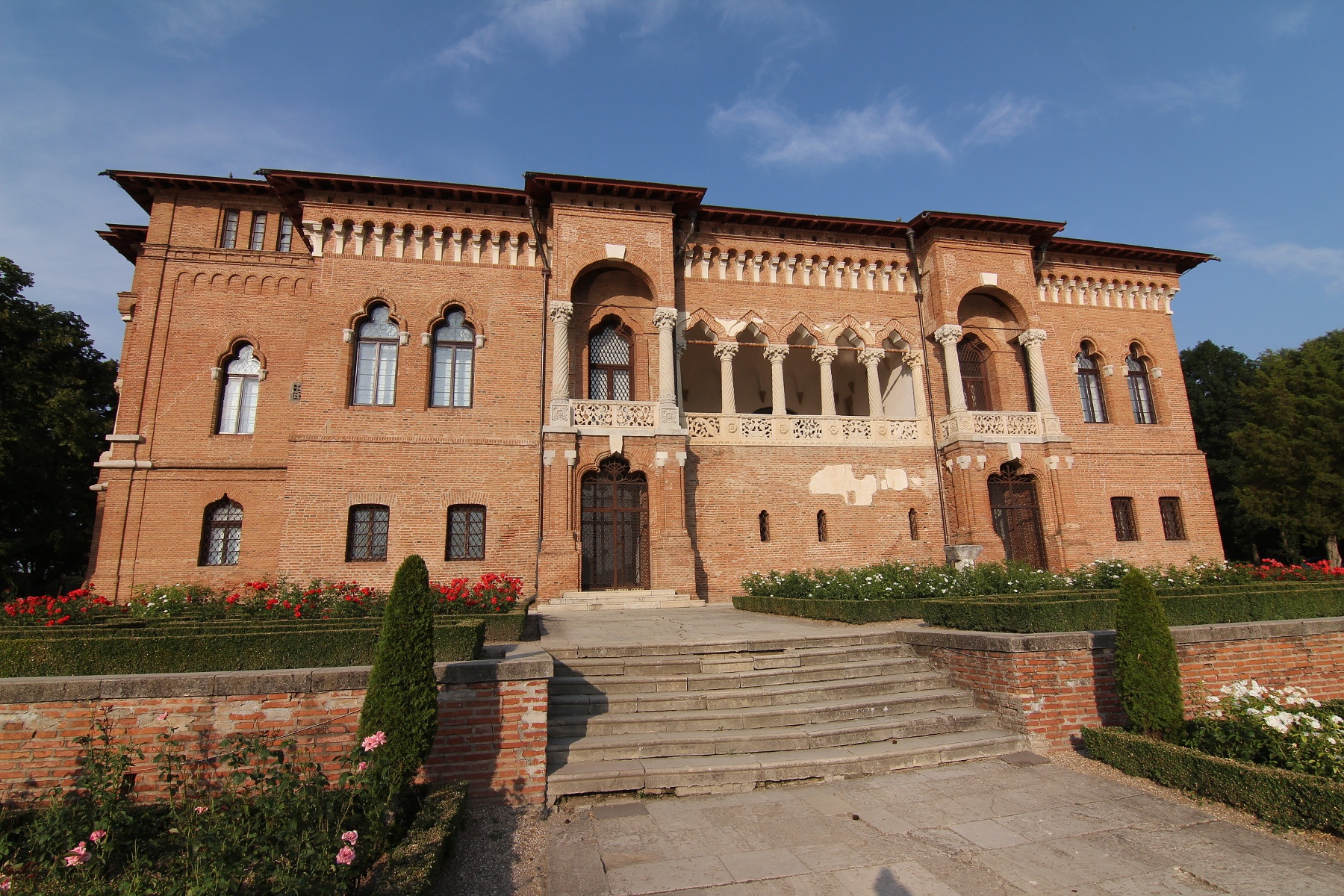
Mogoșoaia Palace near Bucharest, unknown architect, early 18th century

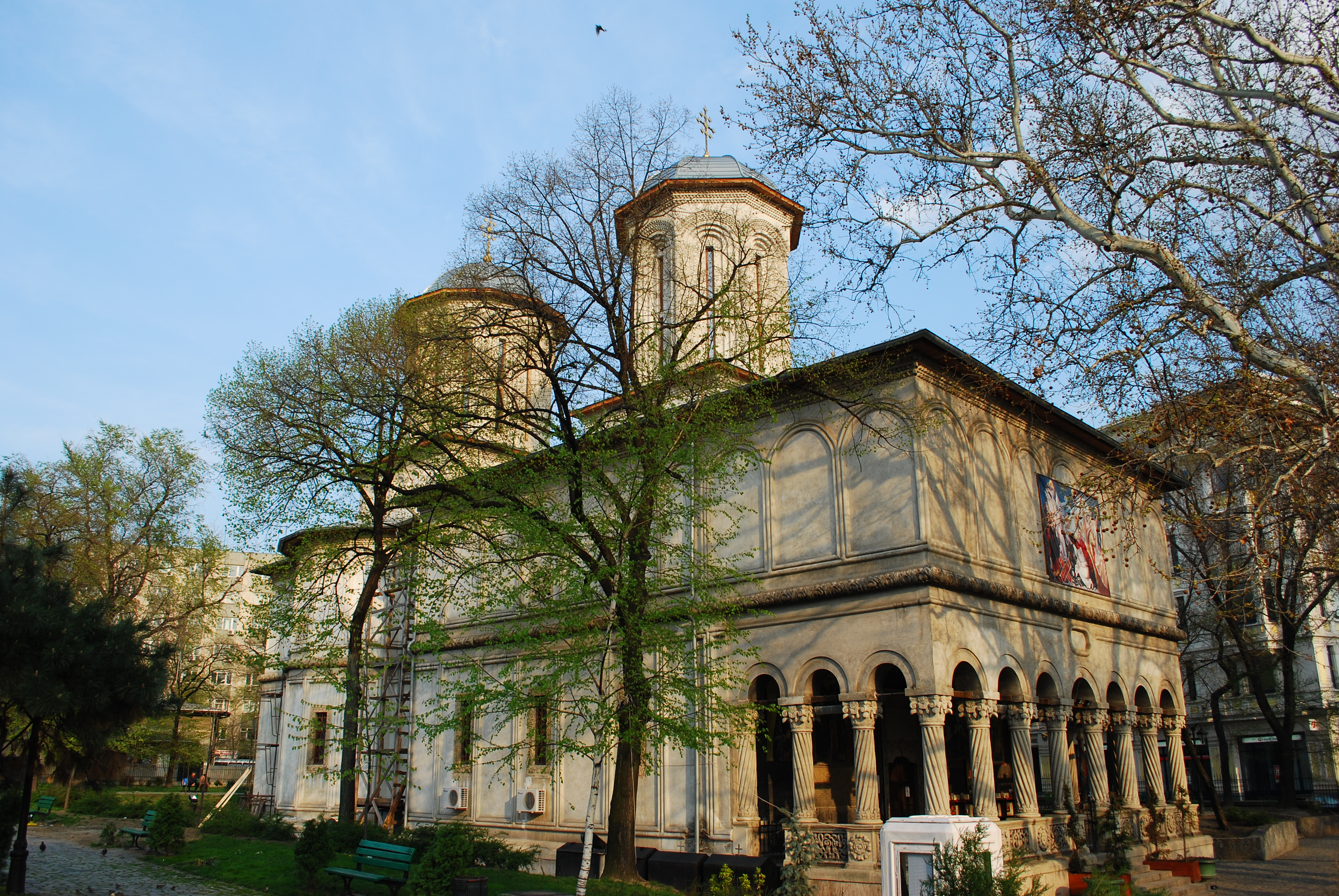
New Saint George Church, Bucharest, unknown architect, finished in 1706

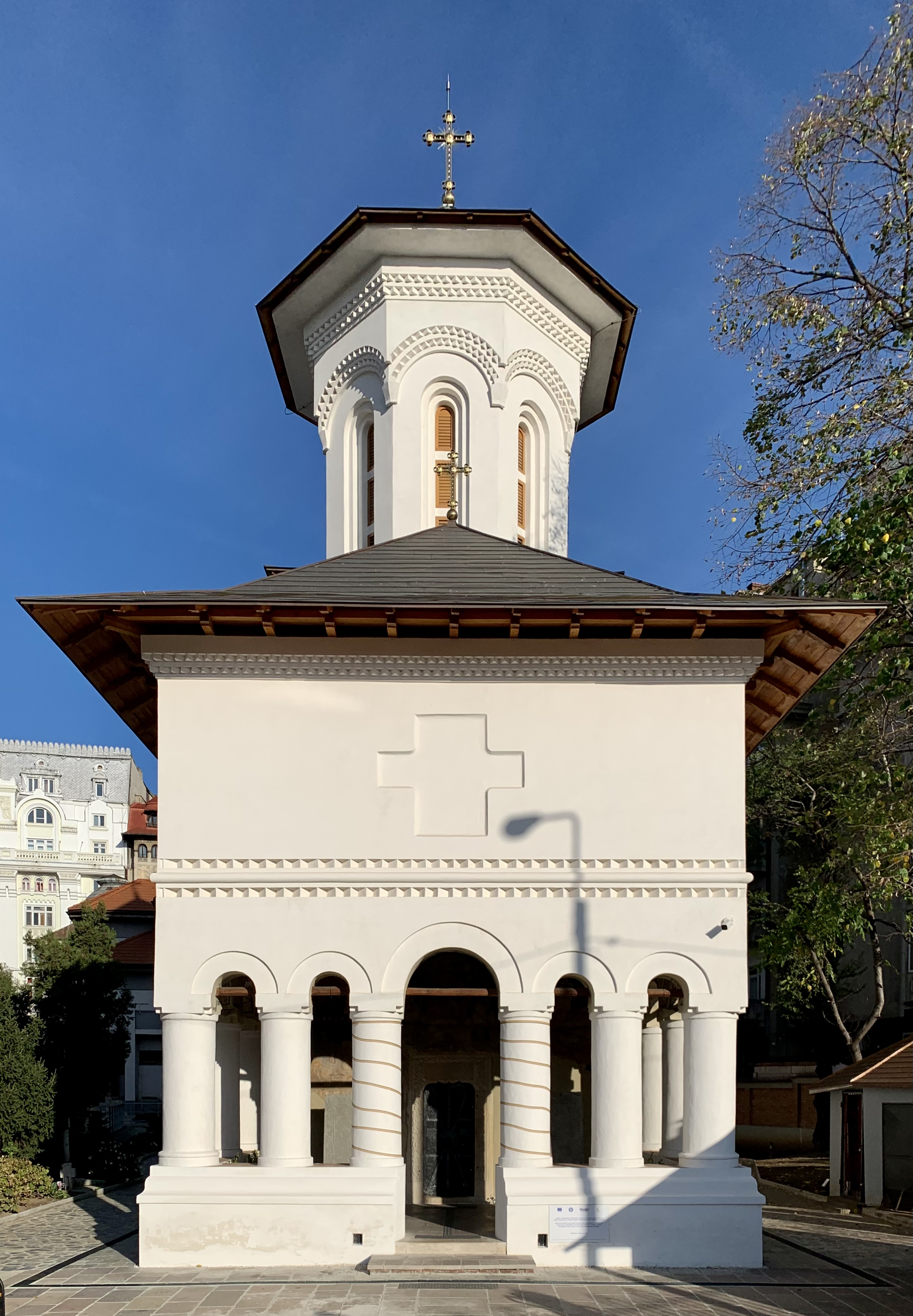
Scaune Church, Bucharest, unknown architect, 1715

The 17th century, the zenith of the pre-modern Romanian civilisation, brought about a more significant development of outstanding lay constructions (elegant boyard mansions or sumptuous princely palaces in Moldavia and Wallachia), as well as the expansion of great monasteries. The latter were endowed with schools, art workshops, printing presses, and they were significant cultural centres. To this period belongs the church of the Trei Ierarhi Monastery in Iaşi, raised in 1635–1639, a unique monument due to its lavish decoration with carved geometric motifs, coloured in lapis lazuli and golden foil, all over the facades. The architectural style developed in Wallachia, especially under the reigns of Matei Basarab (1632–1654) and Constantin Brâncoveanu (1688–1714), is of a remarkable stylistic unity. The Brancovan style is characterized by integration of Baroque and Oriental features into the local tradition. Some examples are the Hurezi Monastery in Oltenia or the princely palace of Mogoșoaia, both of which are lavishly decorated, with beautiful stone carvings, stucco work and paintings.

== The Phanariote period (1711/1716-1821) ==
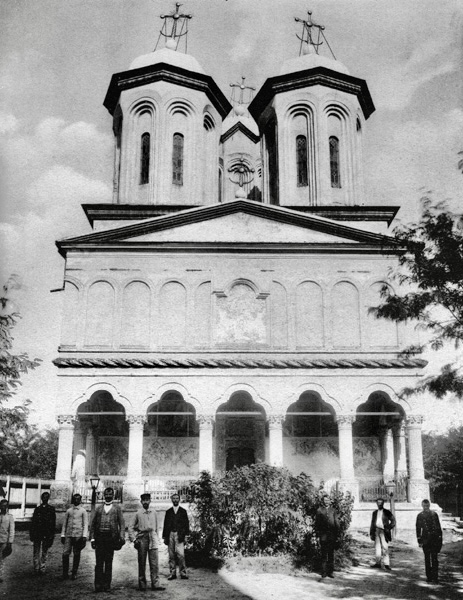
Brâncovenesc - Văcărești Monastery, Bucharest, unknown architect, 1716-1722-destroyed in 1985–1987

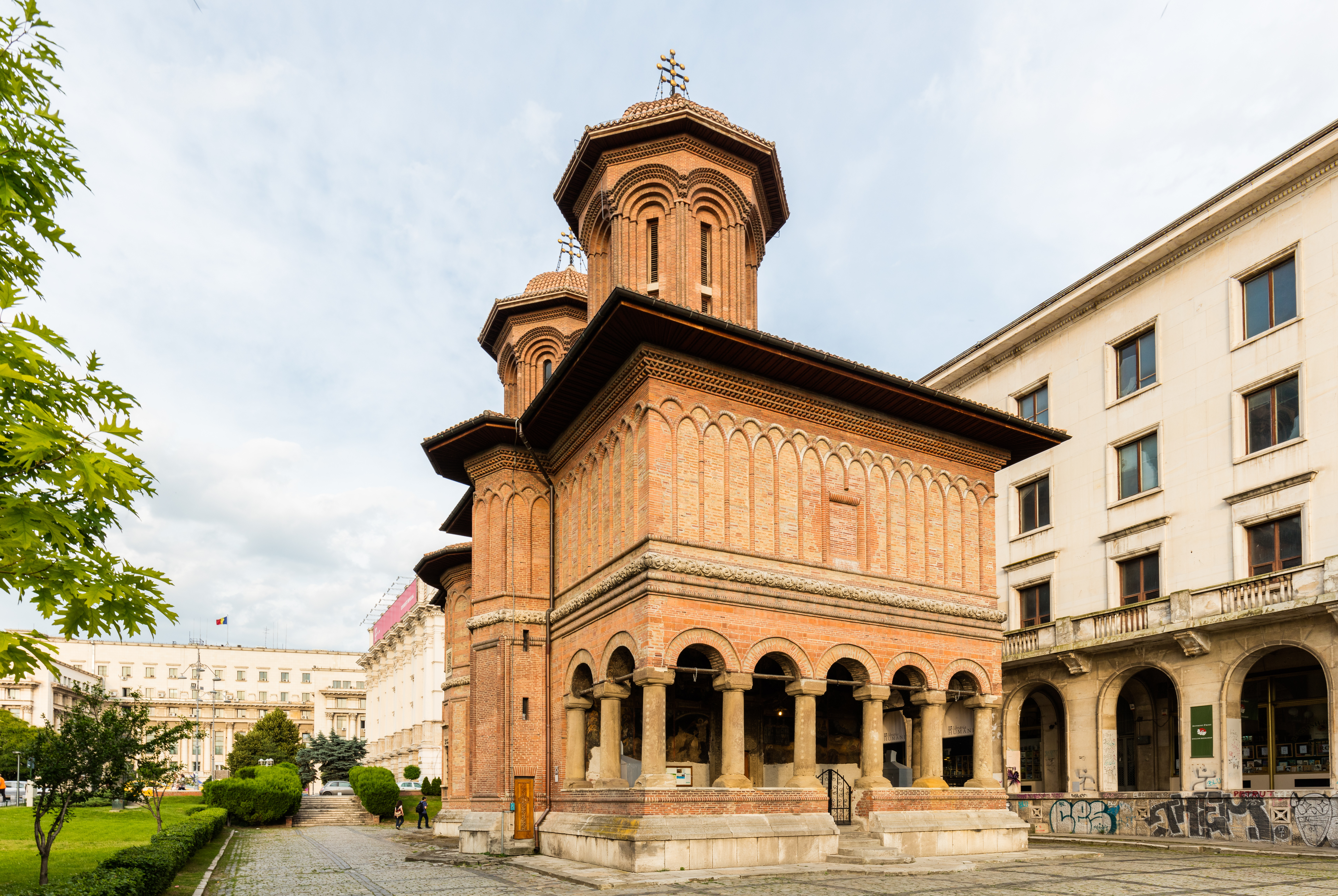
Brâncovenesc - Kretzulescu Church, Bucharest, unknown architect, 1720–1722

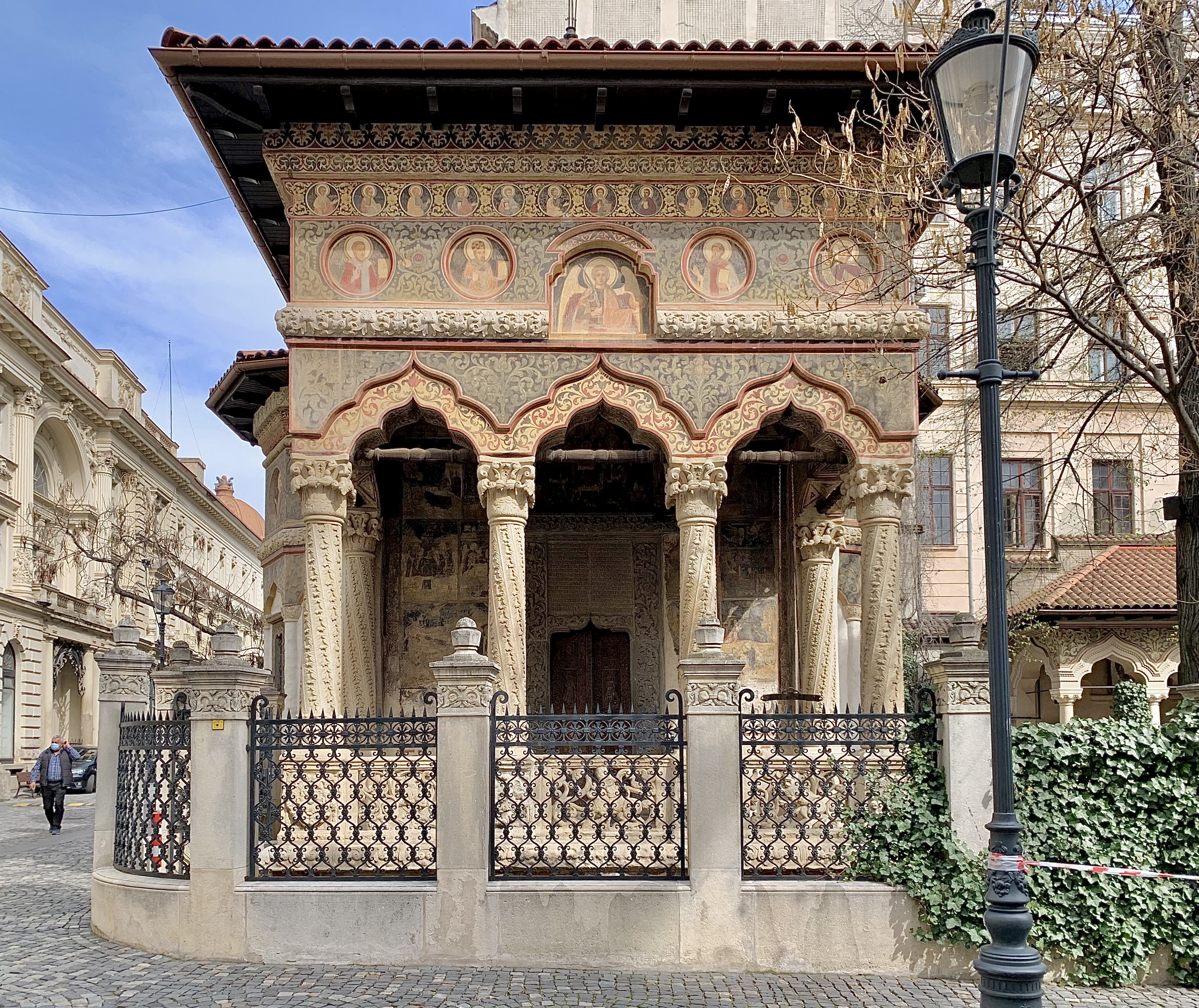
Brâncovenesc - Stavropoleos Monastery Church, Bucharest, unknown architect, 1724

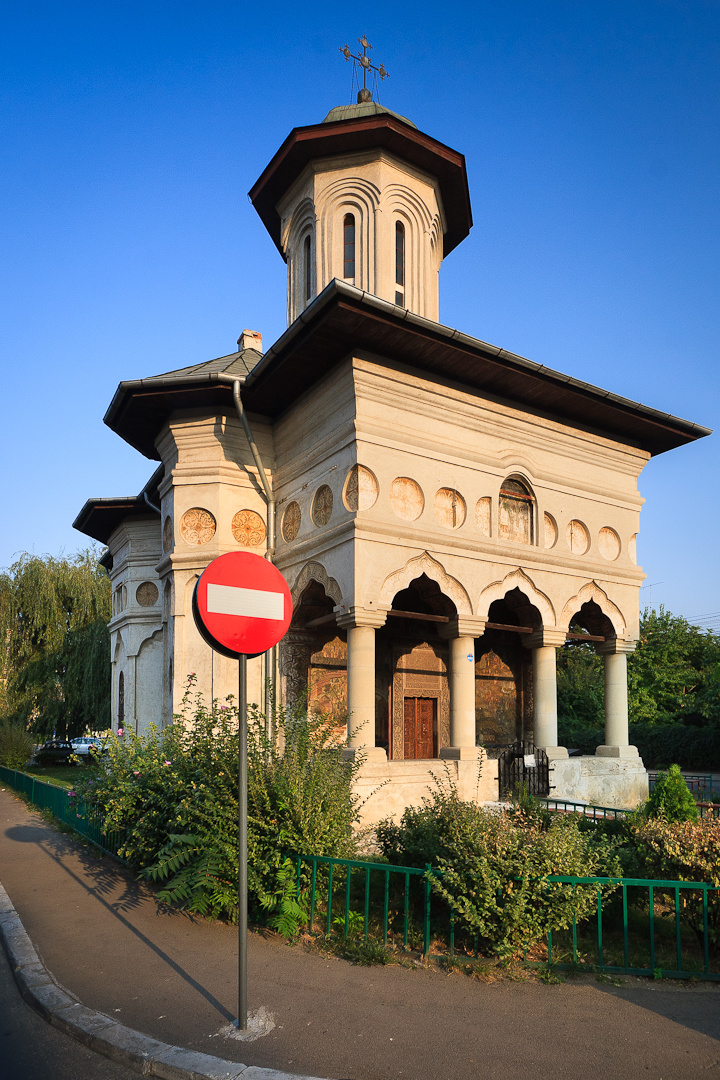
Brâncovenesc - Old St. Eleftherios Church, Bucharest, unknown architect, 1741–1744

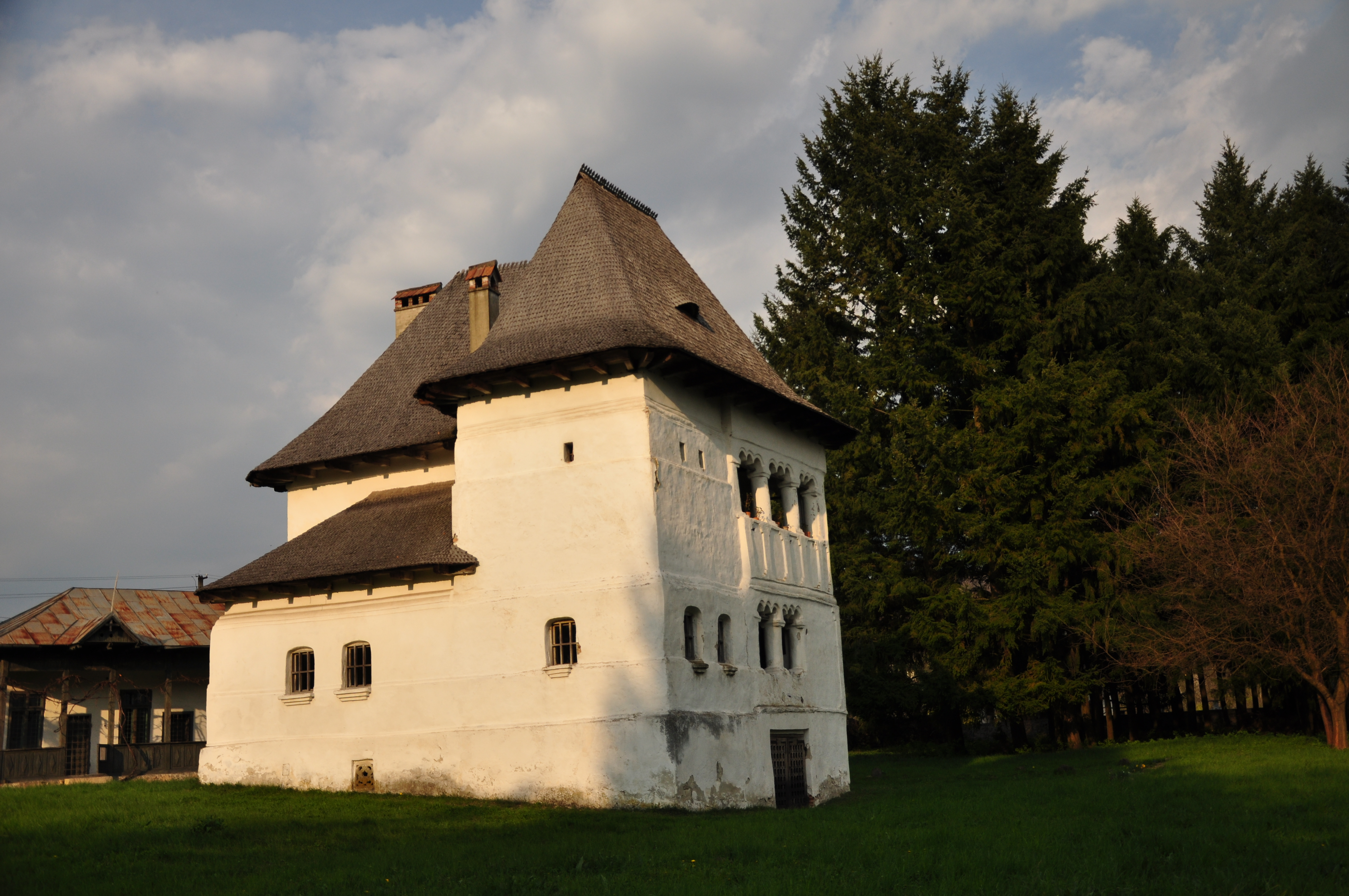
Brâncovenesc - Greceanu Culă, Măldărești, unknown architect, 18th century

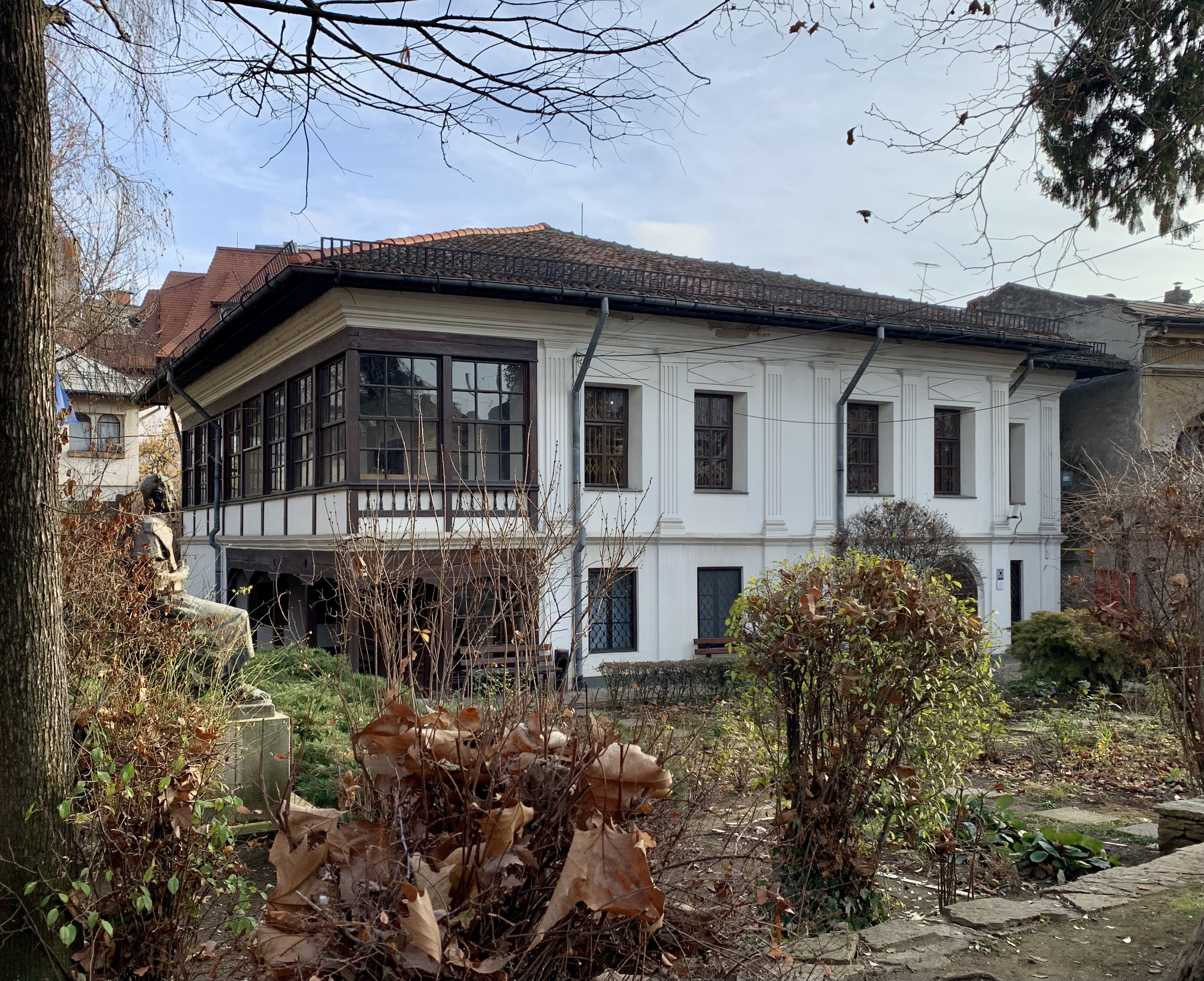
Local Traditional with little Neoclassical influences - Melik House (Strada Spătarului no. 22), Bucharest, unknown architect, 1760

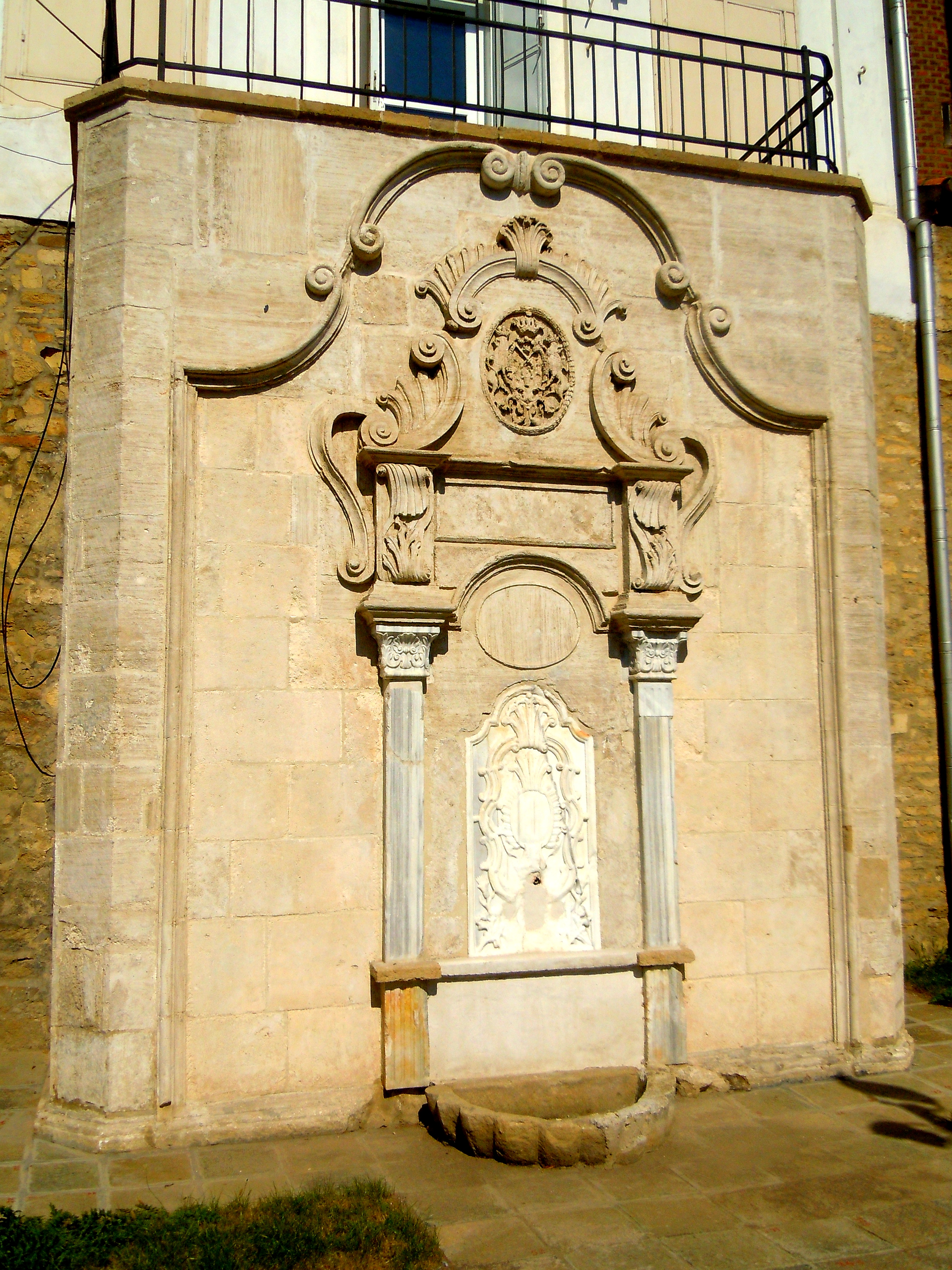
Rococo - Drinking fountain of the Golia Monastery, Iași, unknown architect, 1766

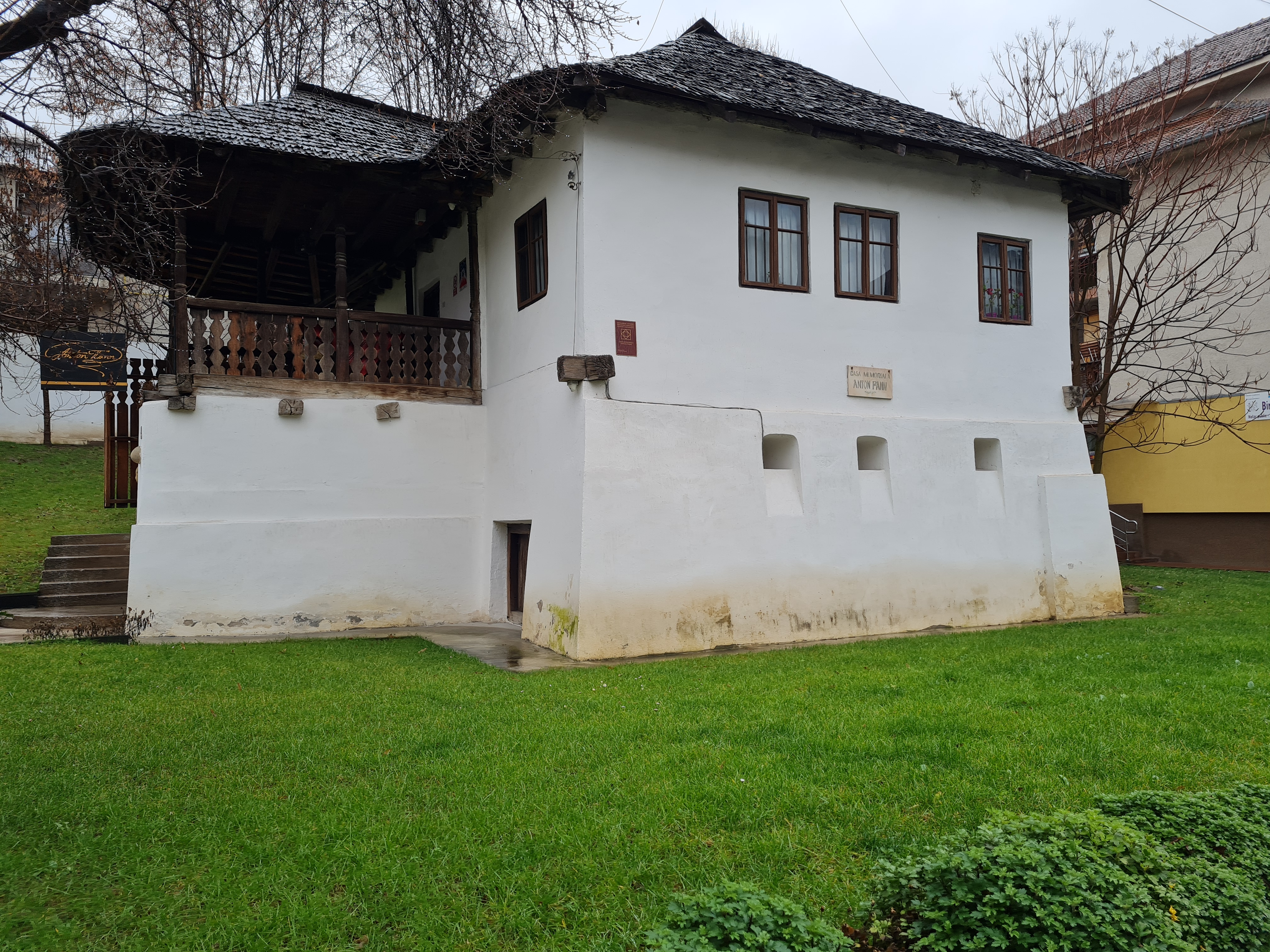
Local Traditional - Anton Pann Memorial House (Strada Știrbei Vodă no. 4), Râmnicu Vâlcea, Romania, unknown architect, late 18th century

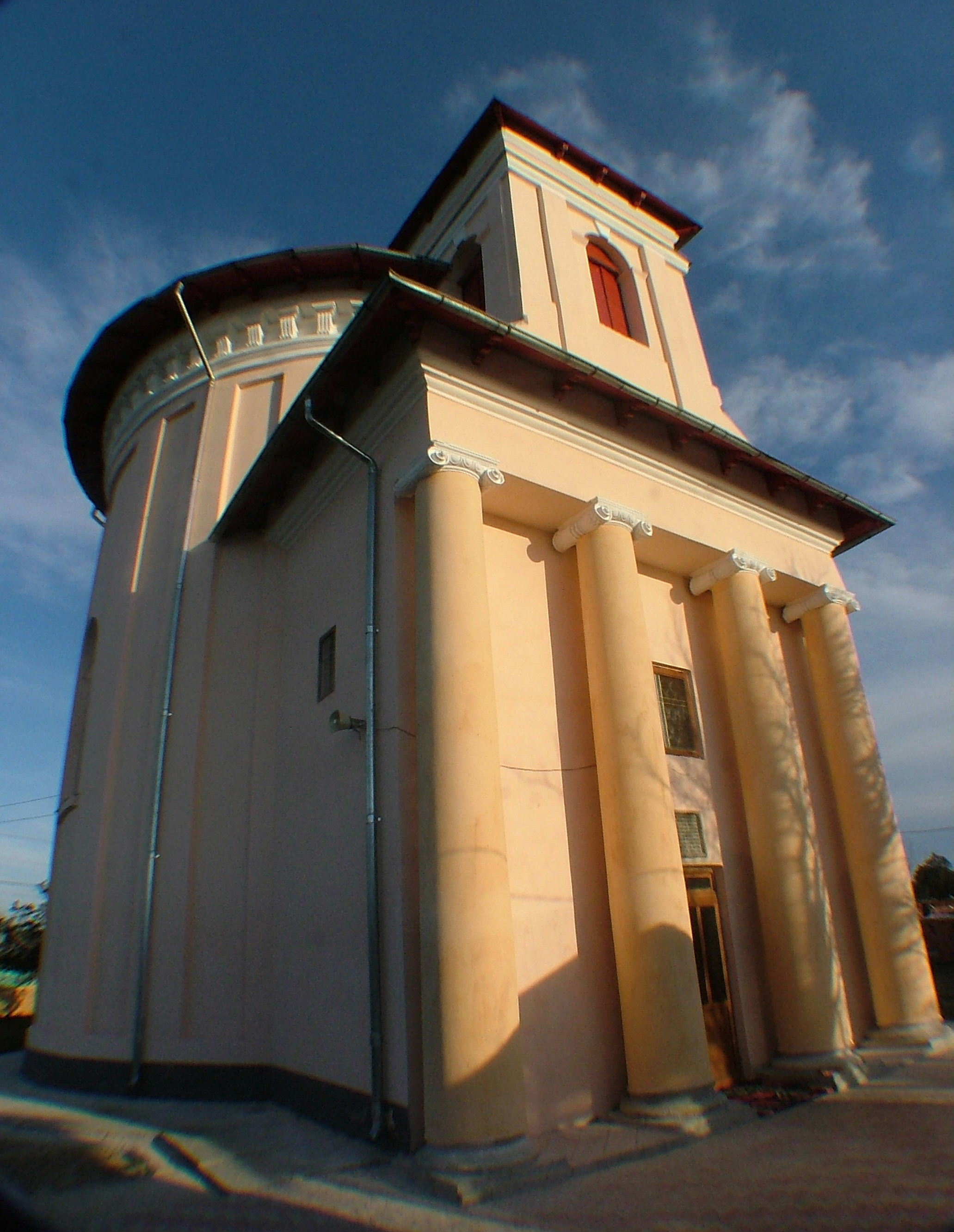
Neoclassical - Round church of Saint Demetrius, Lețcani, unknown architect, 1795

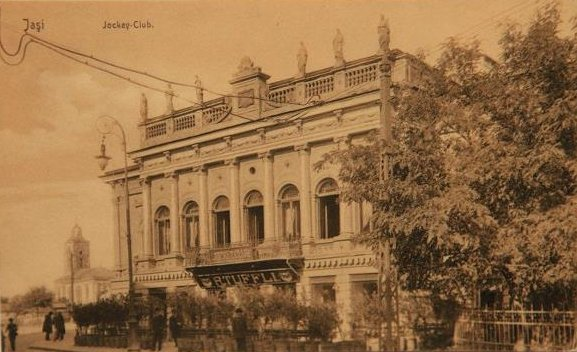
Neoclassical - Balș-Sculy House (at the intersection of Strada Alexandru Lăpușneanu and Strada Păcurari), Iași, by Gheorghe Asachi, 1804-1807-destroyed in 1959

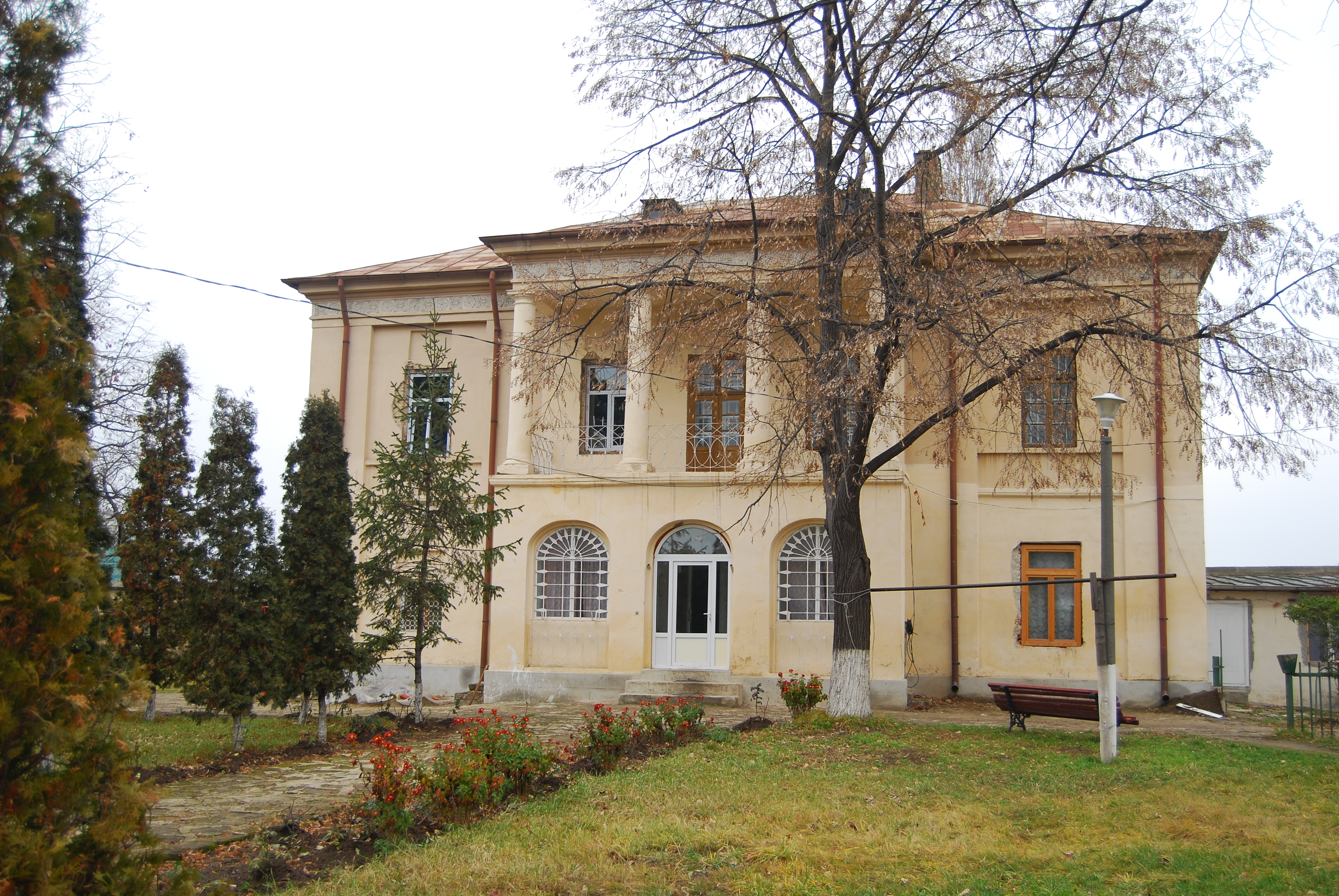
Neoclassical - Palace of the Frumoasa Monastery, Iași, by Martin Kubelka, 1818–1819

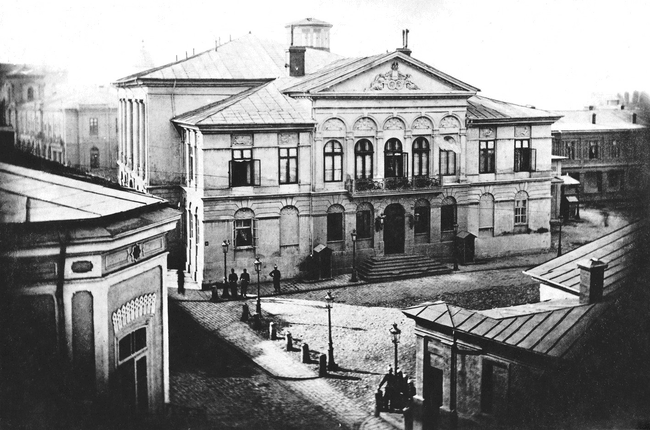
Dinicu Golescu House on Calea Victoriei, Bucharest, unknown architect, 1820

The Phanariots were members of the Greek aristocratic families, who lived in the Fener quarter of Istanbul (Turkey). Some members of these families, who had gained great political influence and considerable fortunes during the 17th century, held very important administrative positions in the Ottoman Empire. Starting 1711 in Moldavia and in 1716 in Walachia, some Phanariots were put as rulers by the Ottoman Empire of these two regions. During the 18th century, there was no big break from the Brâncovenesc style, Phanariote architecture being more or less similar to the one before it. Changes and transitions took place quite slowly, noticeable only when comparing the situations between which there are differences of decades, like the beginning vs the late 18th century.

== Early and mid 19th century (1821-1859) ==
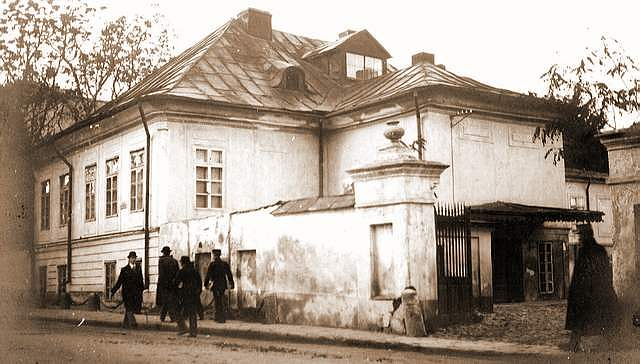
Neoclassical - Moruzi House on Calea Victoriei, Bucharest, unknown architect, 1925-demolished after the 1940 earthquake

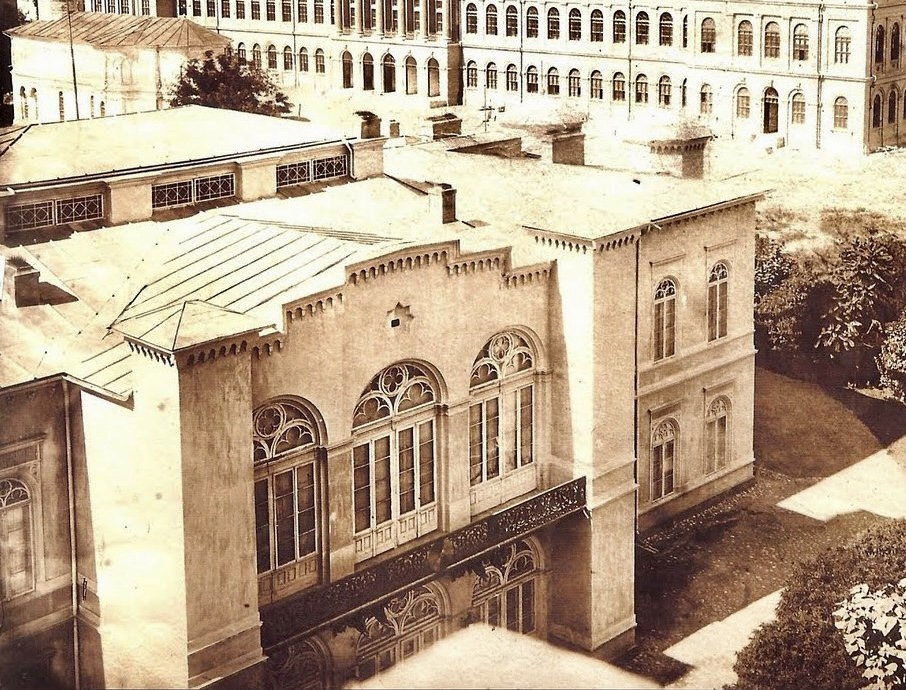
Neoclassical with Gothic Revival window frames - Suțu Palace, now the Bucharest Municipal Museum (Bulevardul Ion C. Brătianu no. 2), by Conrad Schwink and Johann Veit, 1833–1835

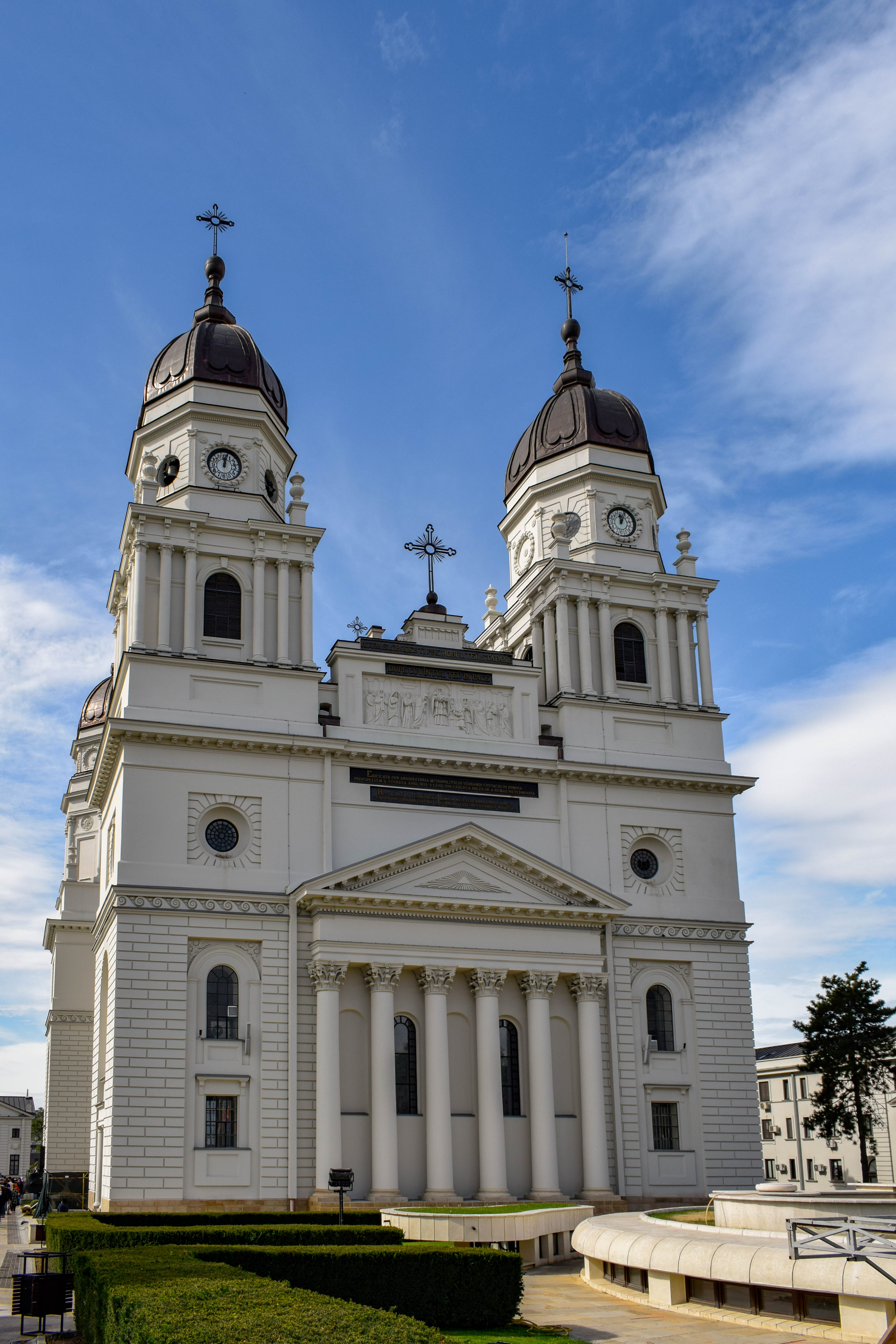
Neoclassical - Metropolitan Cathedral, Iași, 1833-1839, by Gustav Freywald, Bucher and Mihail Singurov, with some later interventions by Alexandru Orăscu from 1887

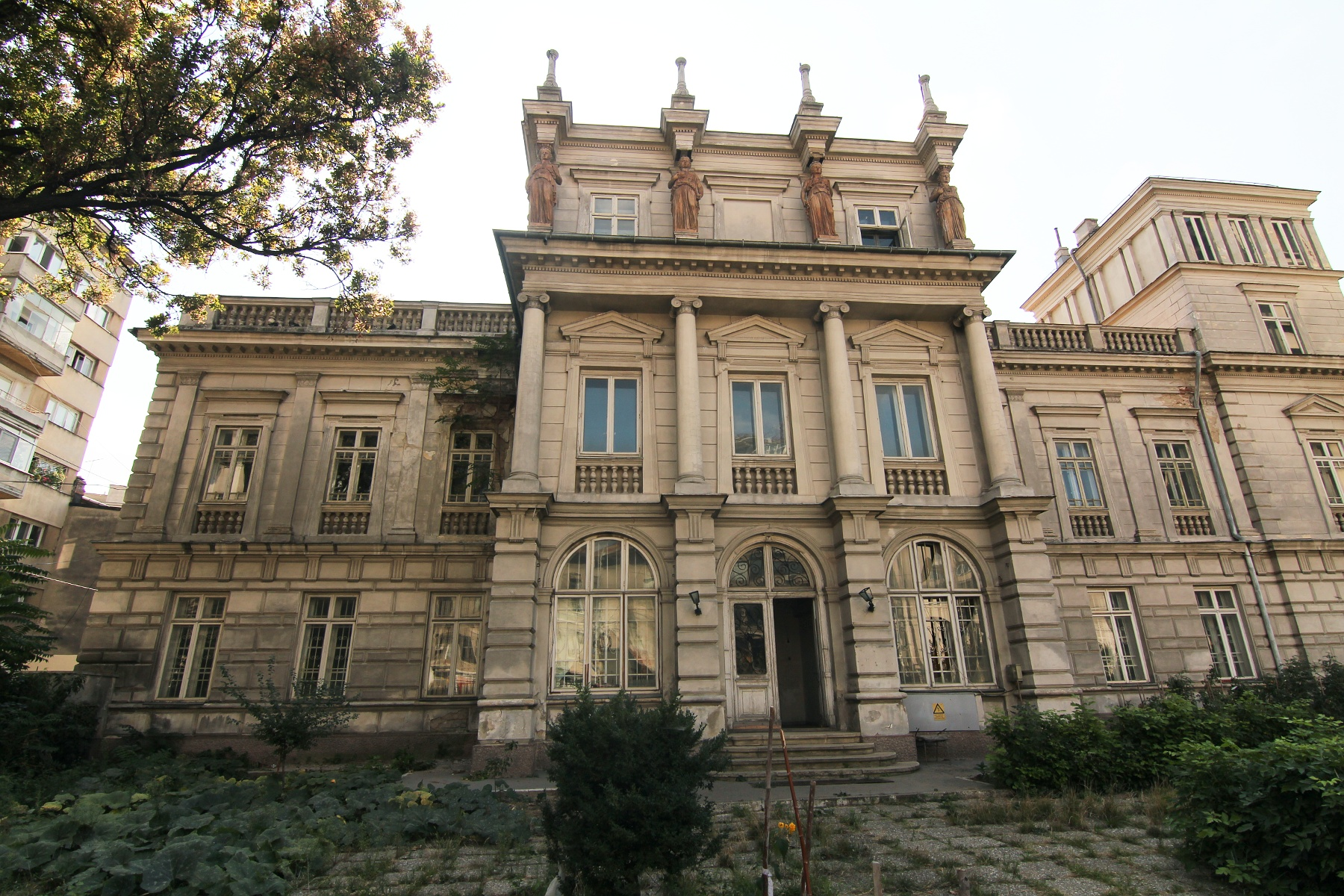
Neoclassical - Știrbei Palace (Calea Victoriei no. 107), by Michel Sanjouand, c.1835; with a new level with caryatids added in 1882 by Joseph Hartmann

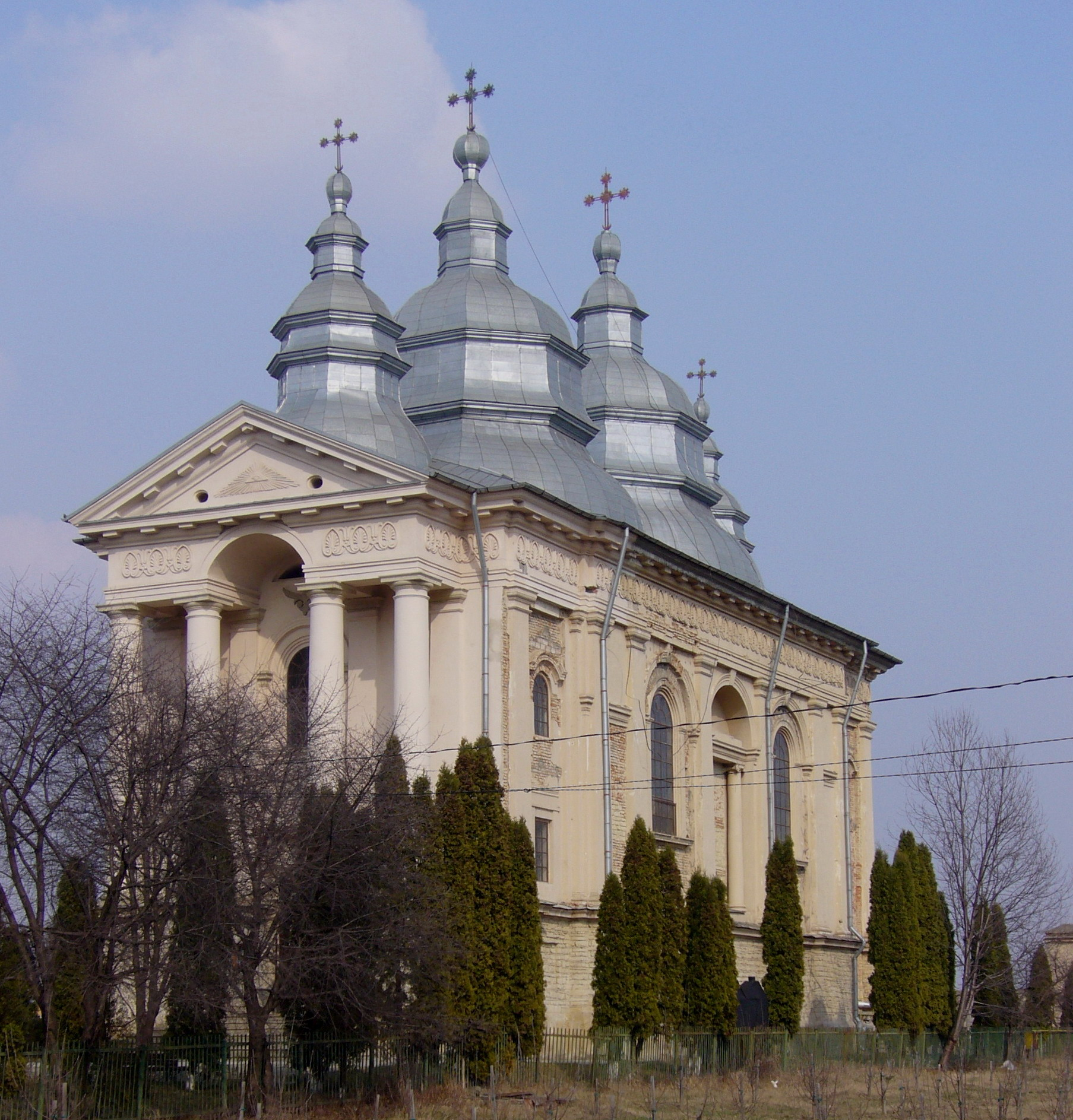
Neoclassical - Frumoasa Monastery Church, Iași, unknown architect, 1836,

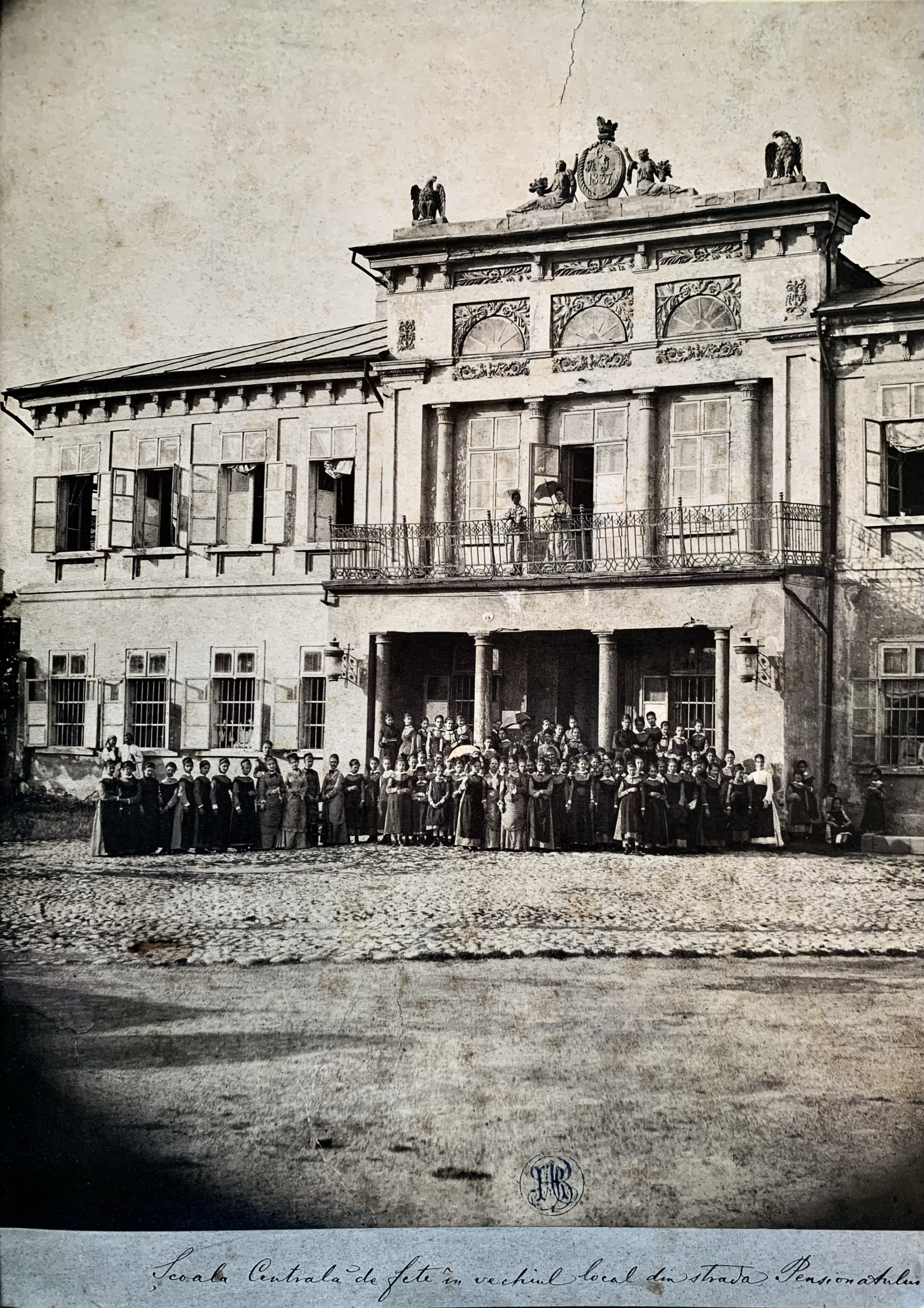
Neoclassical - Alexandru Ghica Palace, in the place where is now the Ministry of Agriculture and Rural Development (Bulevardul Carol I no. 4), Bucharest, unknown architect, 1837-demolished in 1890

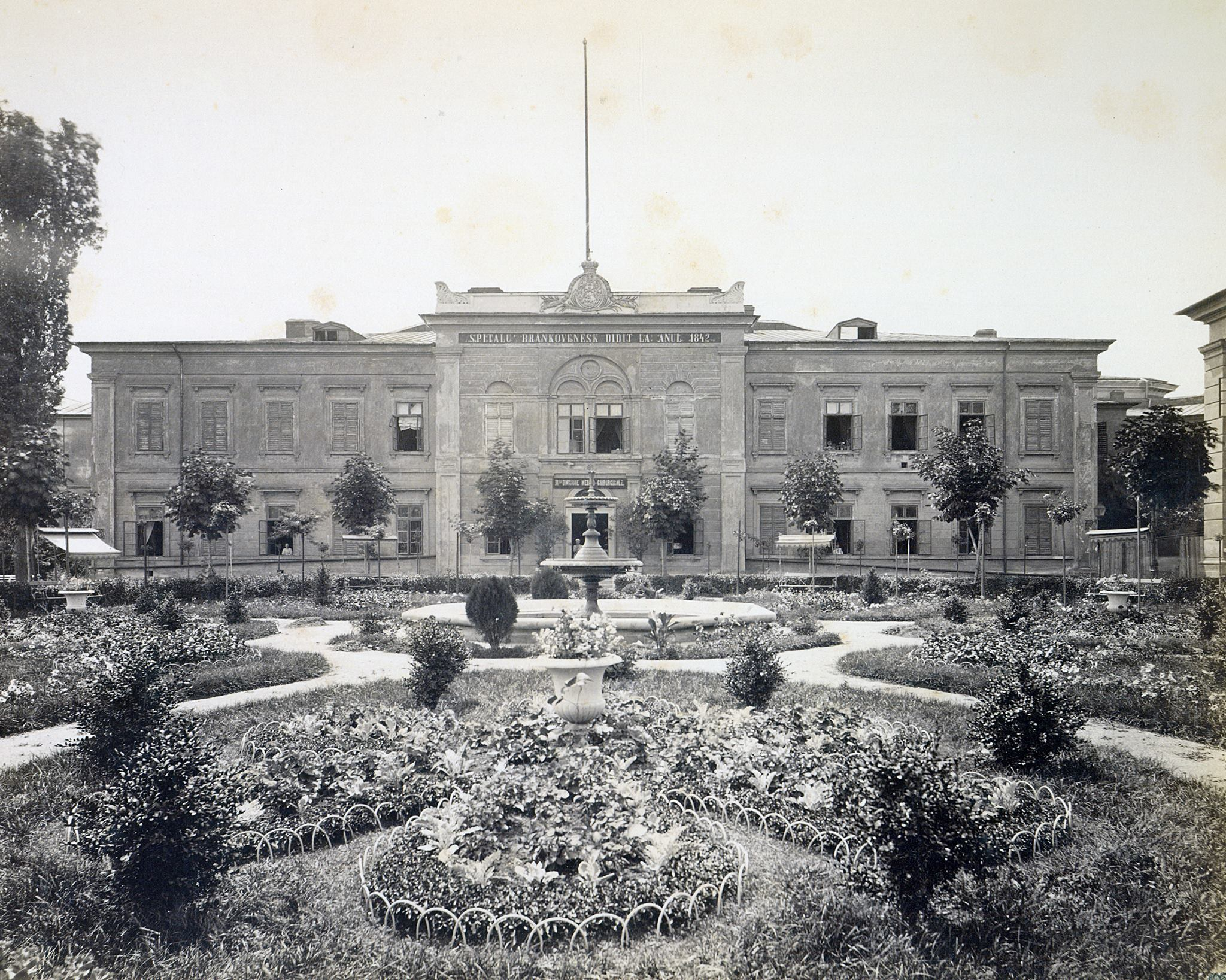
Second part of the Brâncovenesc Hospital in Piața Unirii, Bucharest, by Josef Hartl, 1842 demolished in 1986

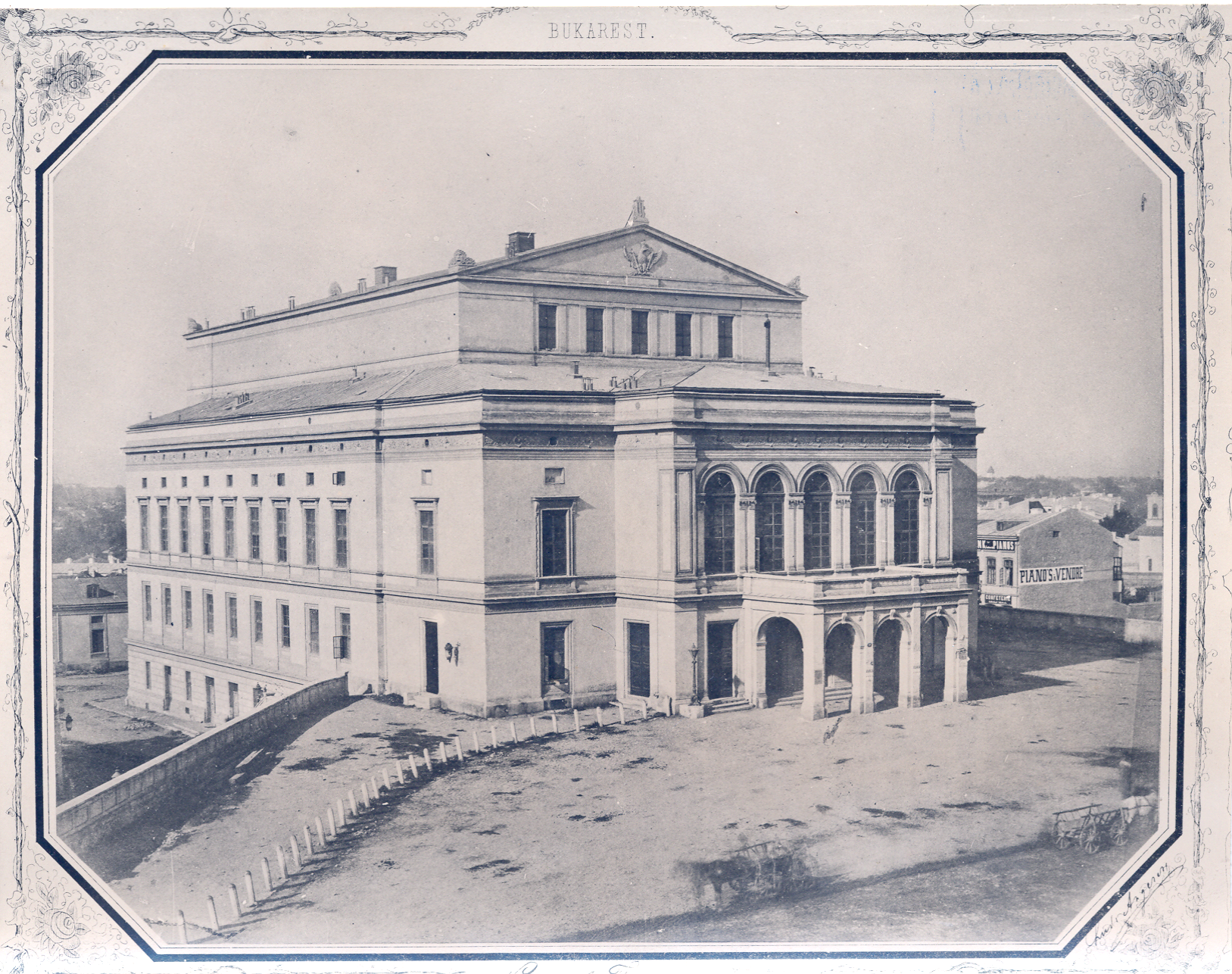
Neoclassical - Former National Theatre on Calea Victoriei, by Anton Heft, 1849–1852, destroyed by bombardments in 1944

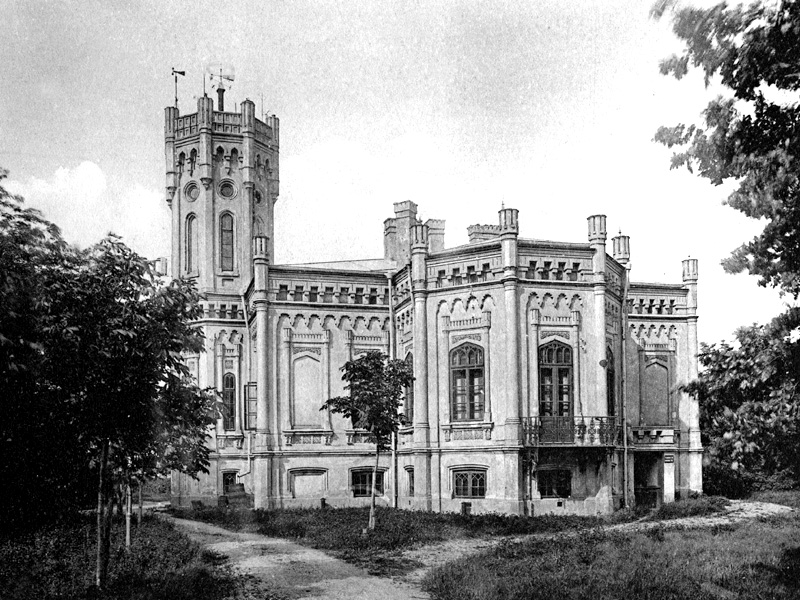
Gothic Revival - Bosianu House (Strada Cuțitul de Argint no. 5), Bucharest, unknown architect, c.1850

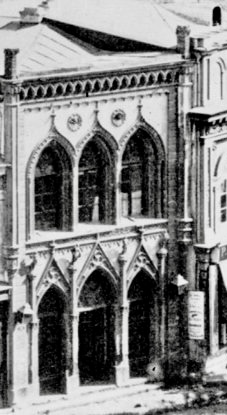
Gothic Revival - Bossel Hall on Calea Victoriei, unknown architect, c.1850

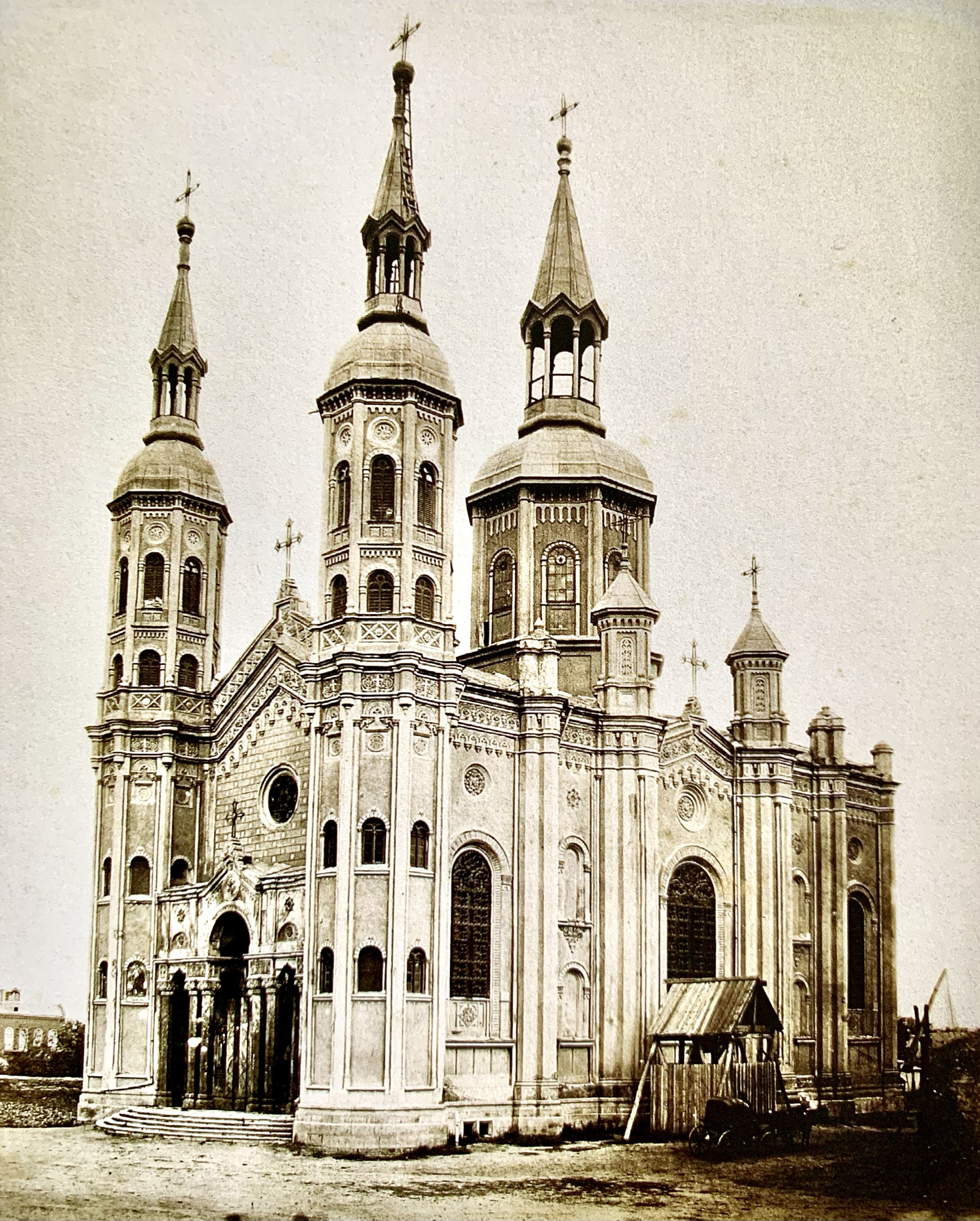
Gothic Revival - Saint Spyridon the New Church, Bucharest, unknown architect, finished in 1858

In the first half of the 19th century, urban life grew considerably and there was a Western-oriented modernization policy. During this century, the predominant style was Classicism which lasted for a long time, until the 20th century, although it coexisted in some short periods with other styles. Foreign architects and engineers were invited here since the first decade of the 19th century. Most of the architects that built during the beginning of the century were foreigners because Romanians didn't have yet the instruction needed for designing buildings that were very different compared to the Romanian tradition. Usually using Classicism, they start building together with Romanian artisans, usually prepared in foreign schools or academies. Romanian architects study in Western European schools as well. One example is Alexandru Orăscu, one of the representatives of Neoclassicism in Romania.

Classicism manifested both in religious and secular architecture. A good example of secular architecture is the Știrbei Palace on Calea Victoriei (Bucharest), built around the year 1835, after the plans of French architect Michel Sanjouand. It received a new level in 1882, designed by Austrian architect Joseph Hartmann

== The Cuza period (1859-1866) ==
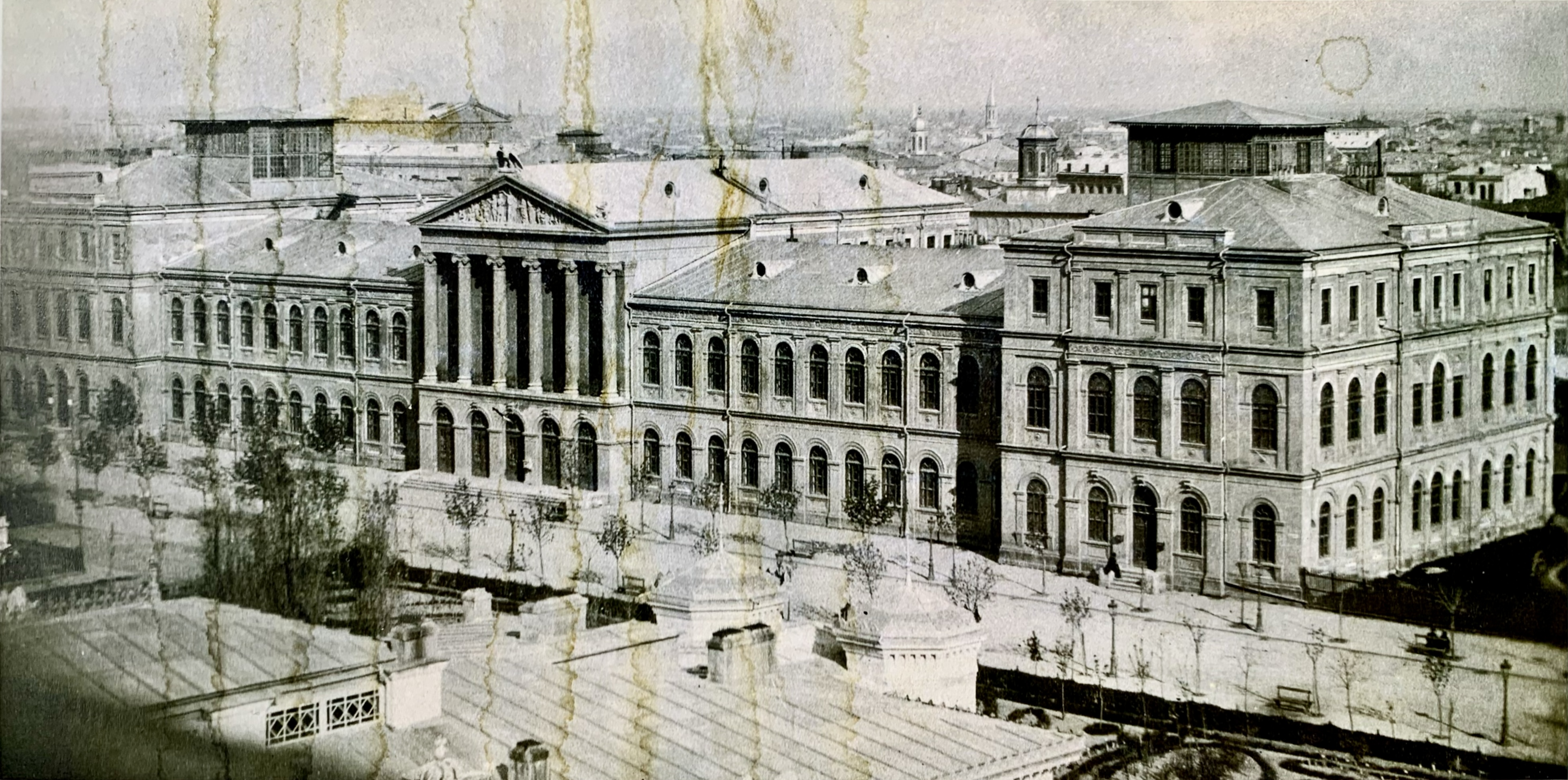
Neoclassical - The old building of the University of Bucharest, 1857–1864, bombarded in April or May 1944 during WW2 and partially destroyed, partially rebuilt during the late 1960s, designed by Alexandru Orăscu and decorated with sculptures by Karl Storck

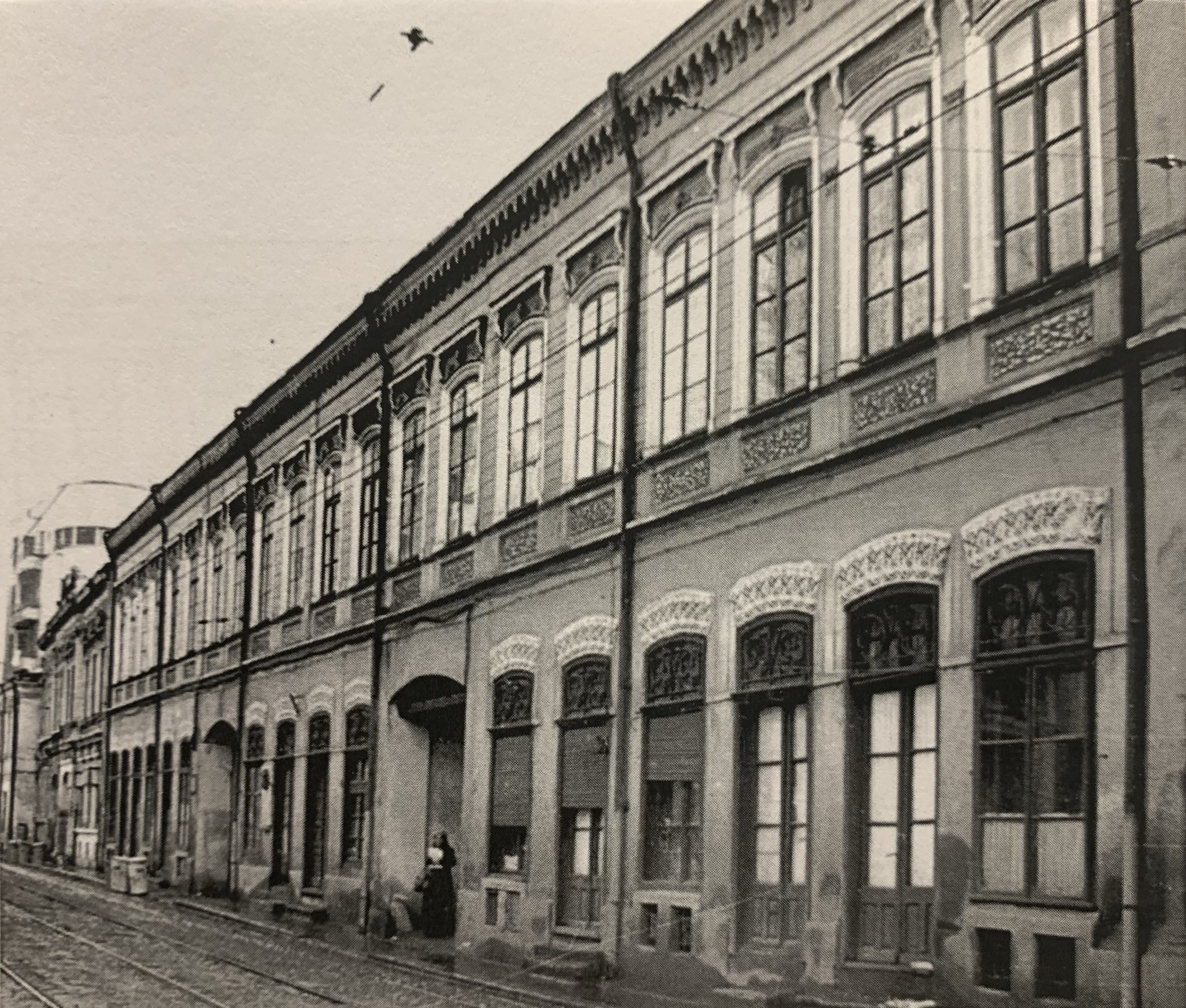
Mix of Neoclassicism and Local/Wallachian Gothic Revival - Solacolu Inn (Calea Moșilor no. 108), unknown architect, 1859

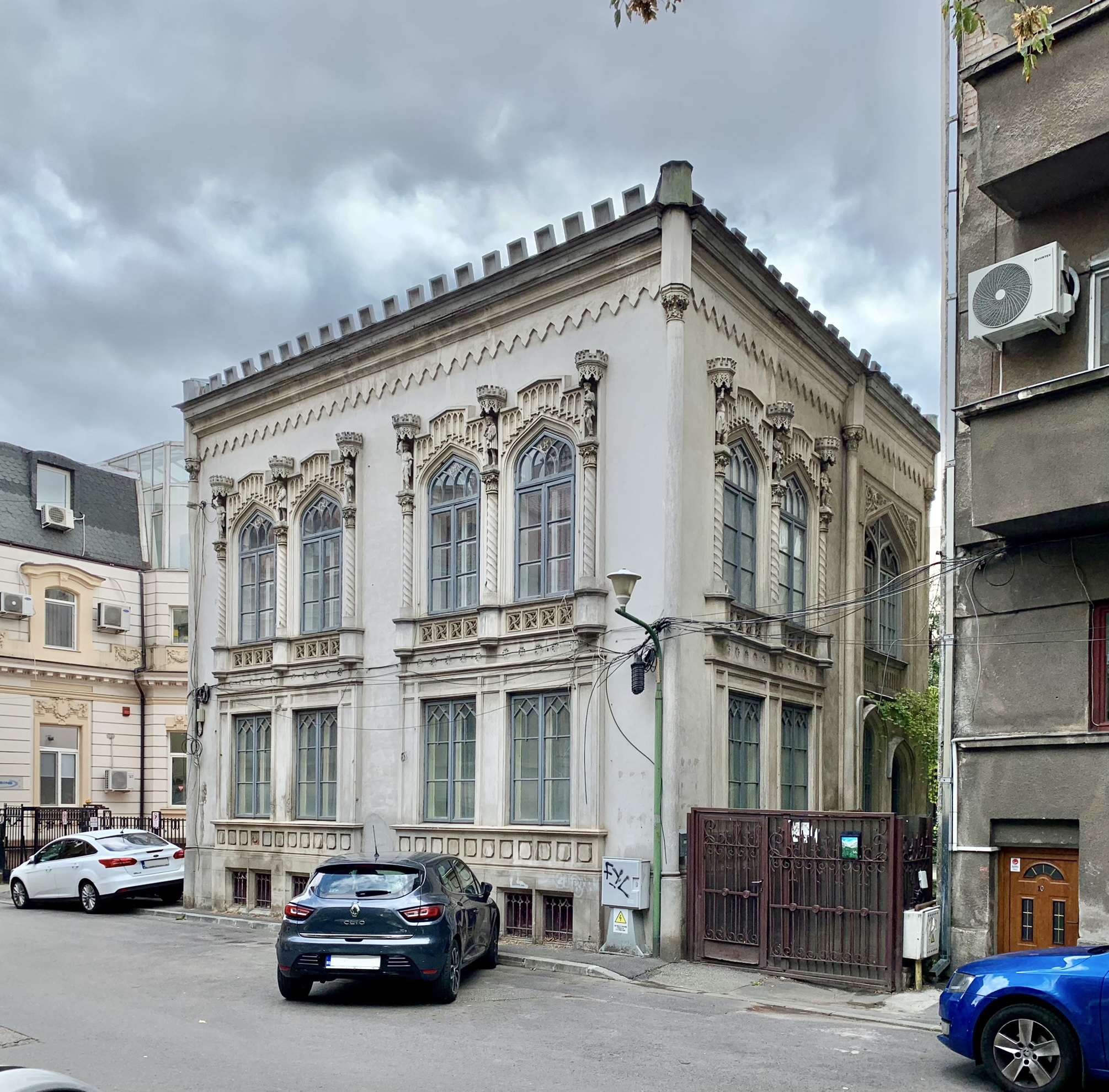
Local/Wallachian Gothic Revival - House of Guilds (Strada Stelea Spӑtarul no. 10), Bucharest, 1859–1862, by Luigi Lipizer

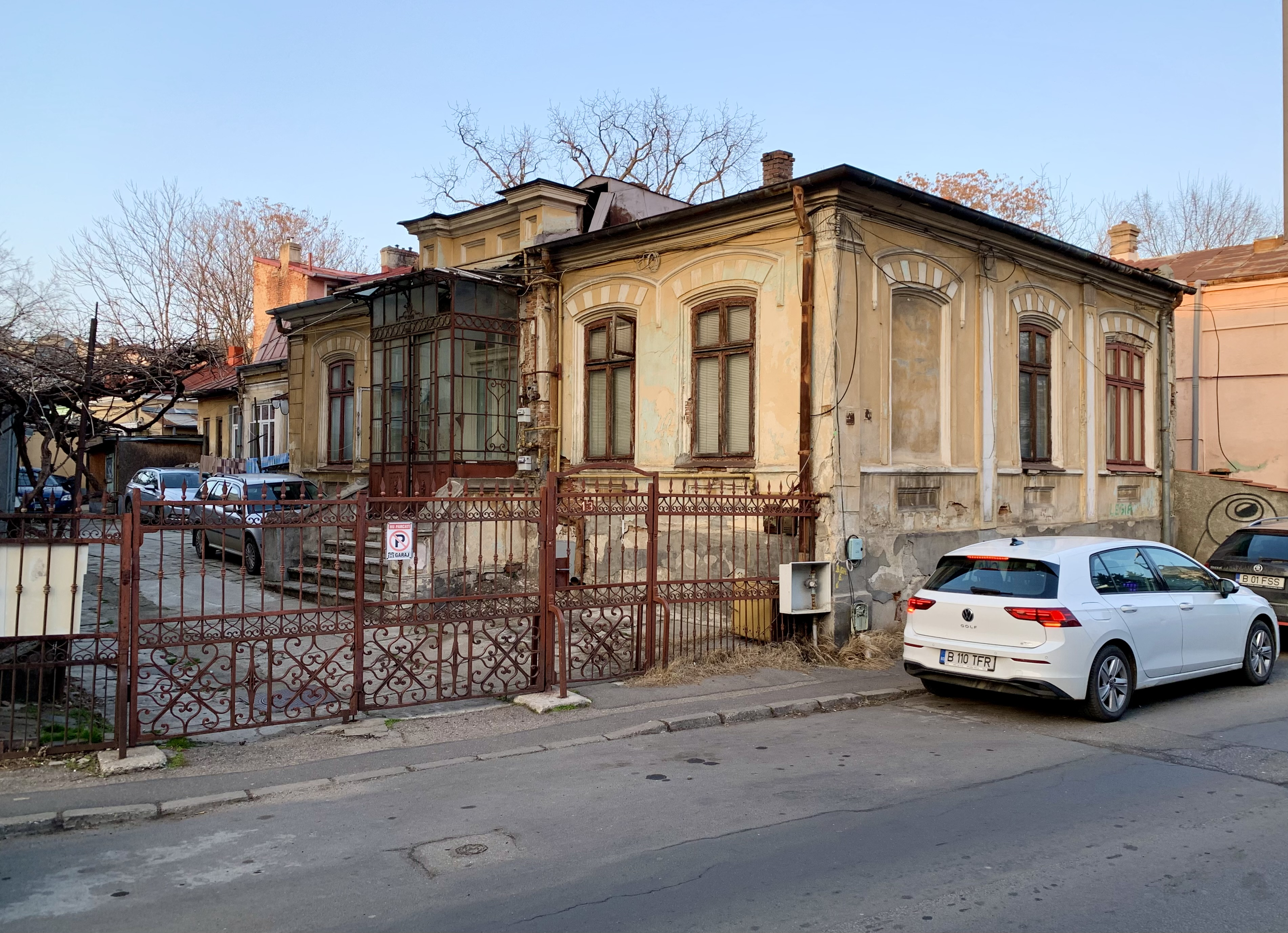
Neoclassical - Strada C.F.Robescu no. 13, Bucharest, c.1860, unknown architect

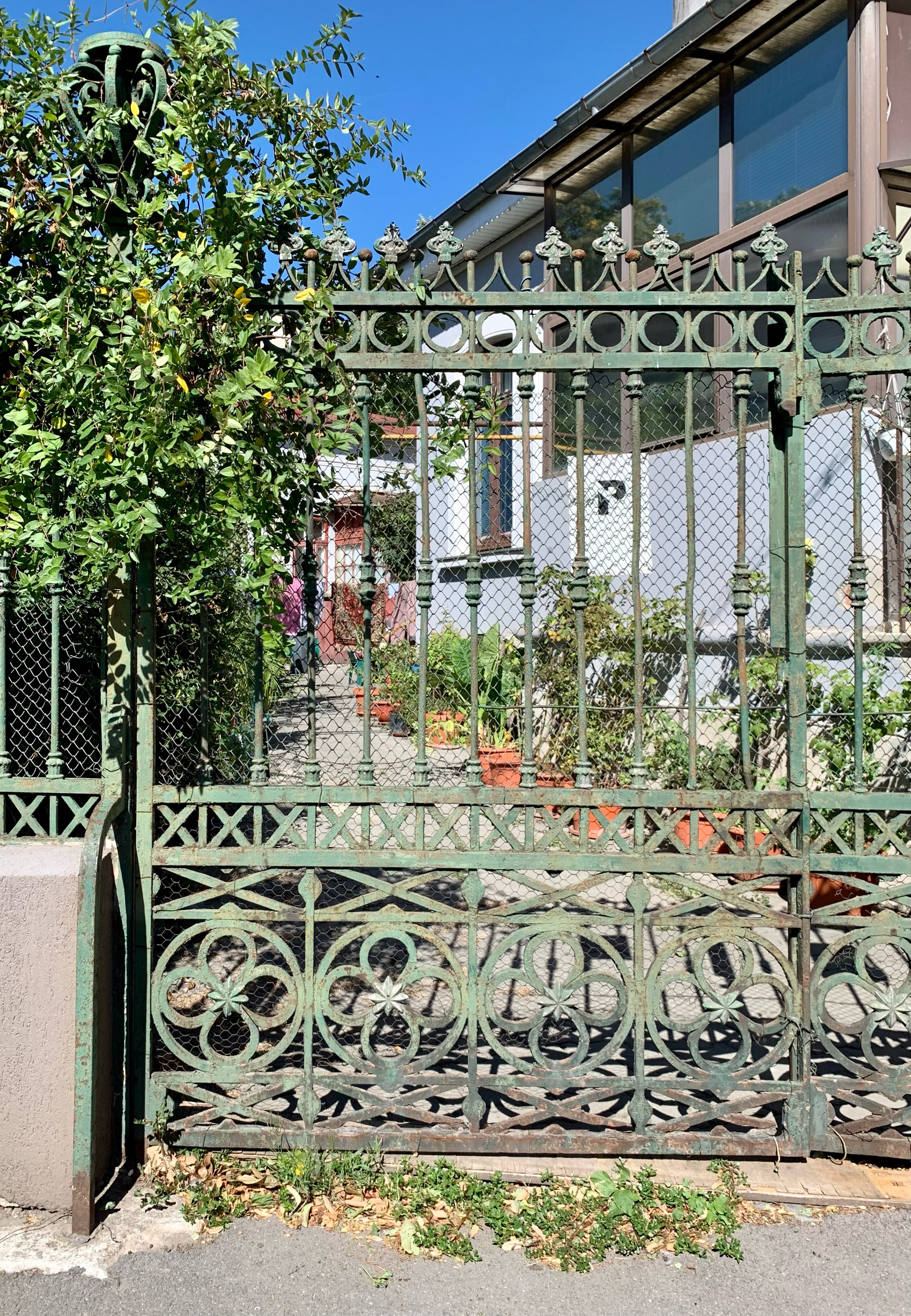
Local/Wallachian Gothic Revival - Fence of Strada C.F. Robescu no. 9, Bucharest, c.1960, unknown architect

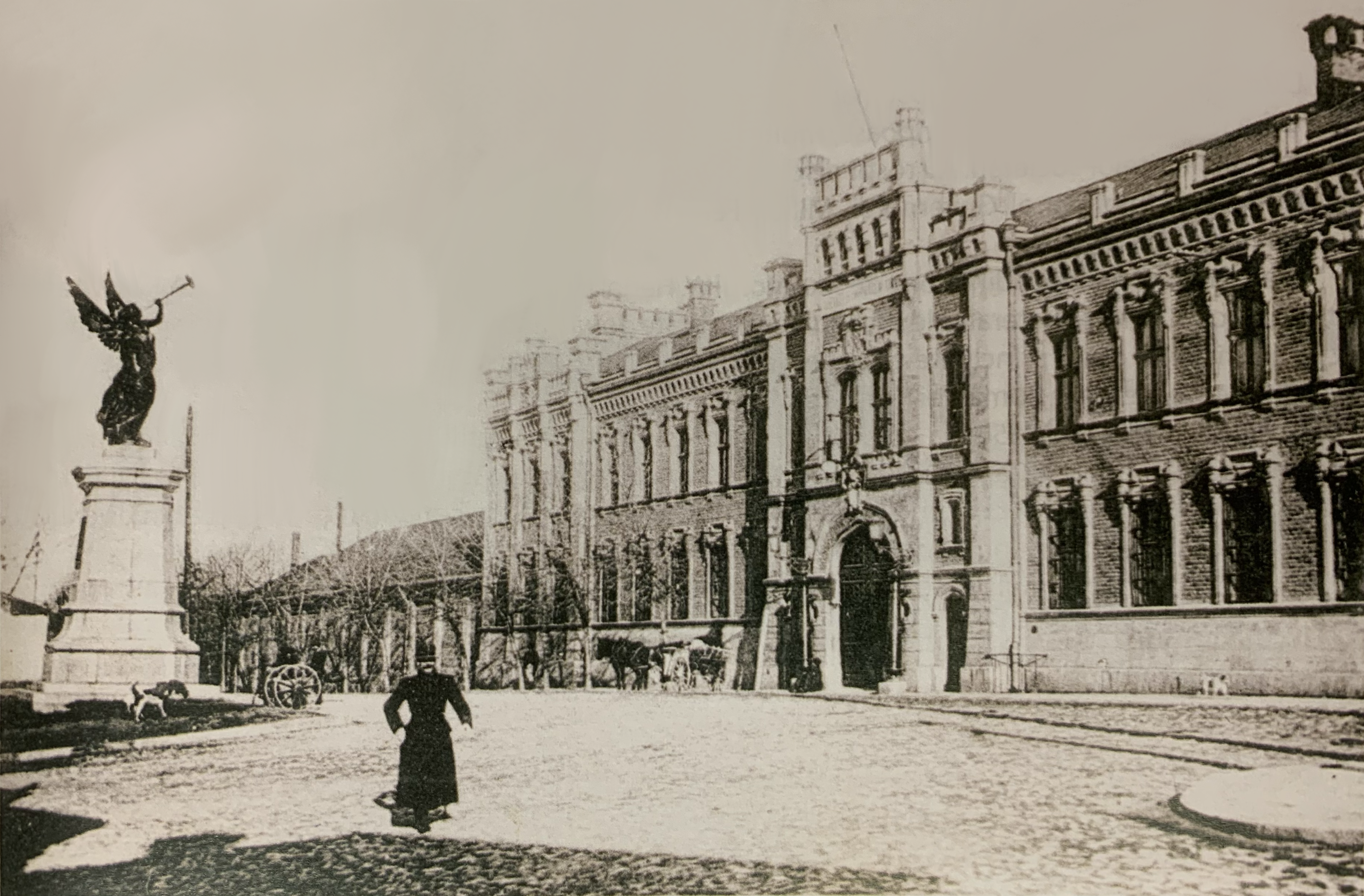
Local/Wallachian Gothic Revival - Main Building and Gate of the Army Arsenal, Bucharest, 1860–1861, demolished during the mid or late 1980s, by Luigi Lipizer

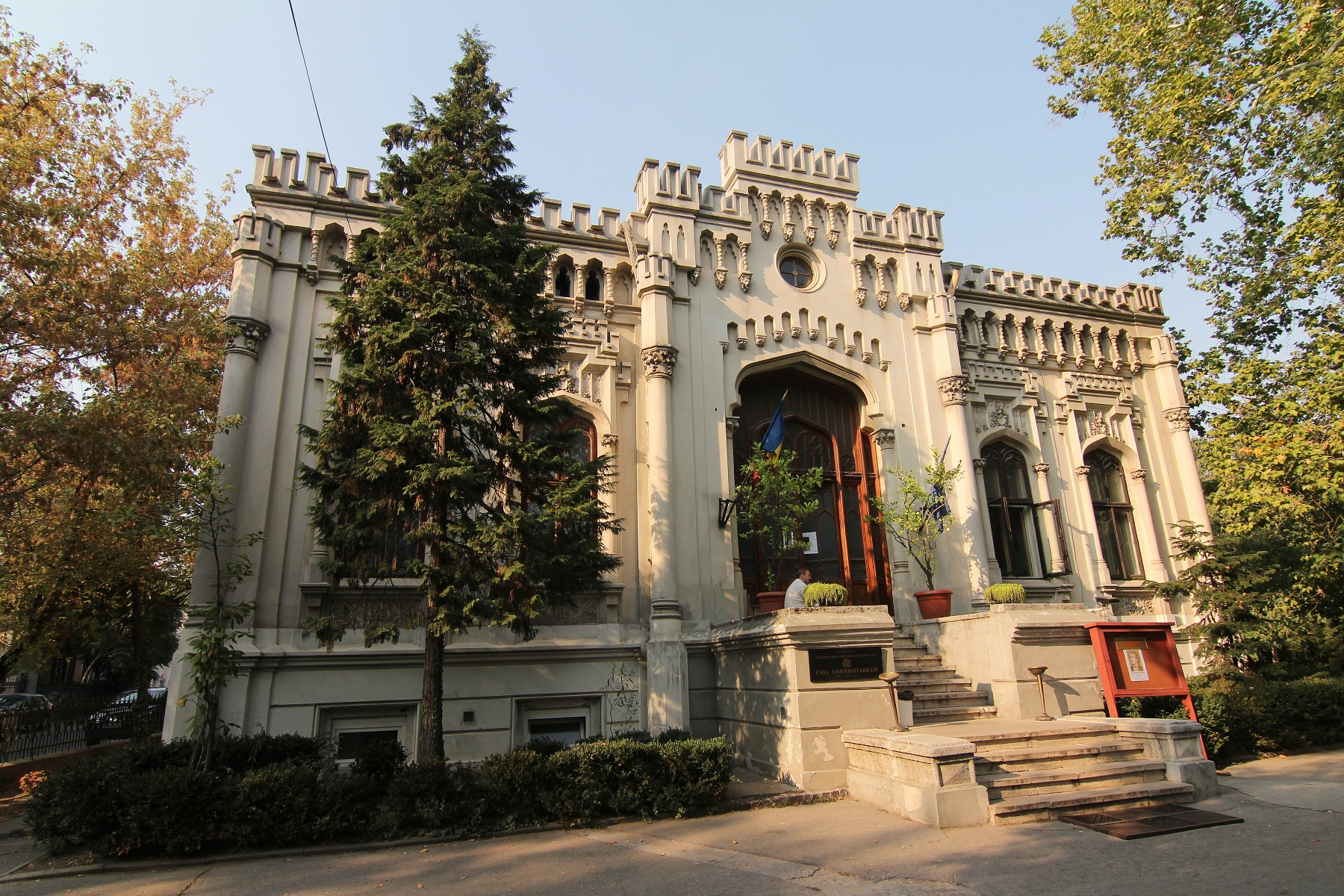
Local/Wallachian Gothic Revival - Cezar Librecht House (Strada Lupu Dionisie no. 46), Bucharest, 1860–1865, by Luigi Lipizer

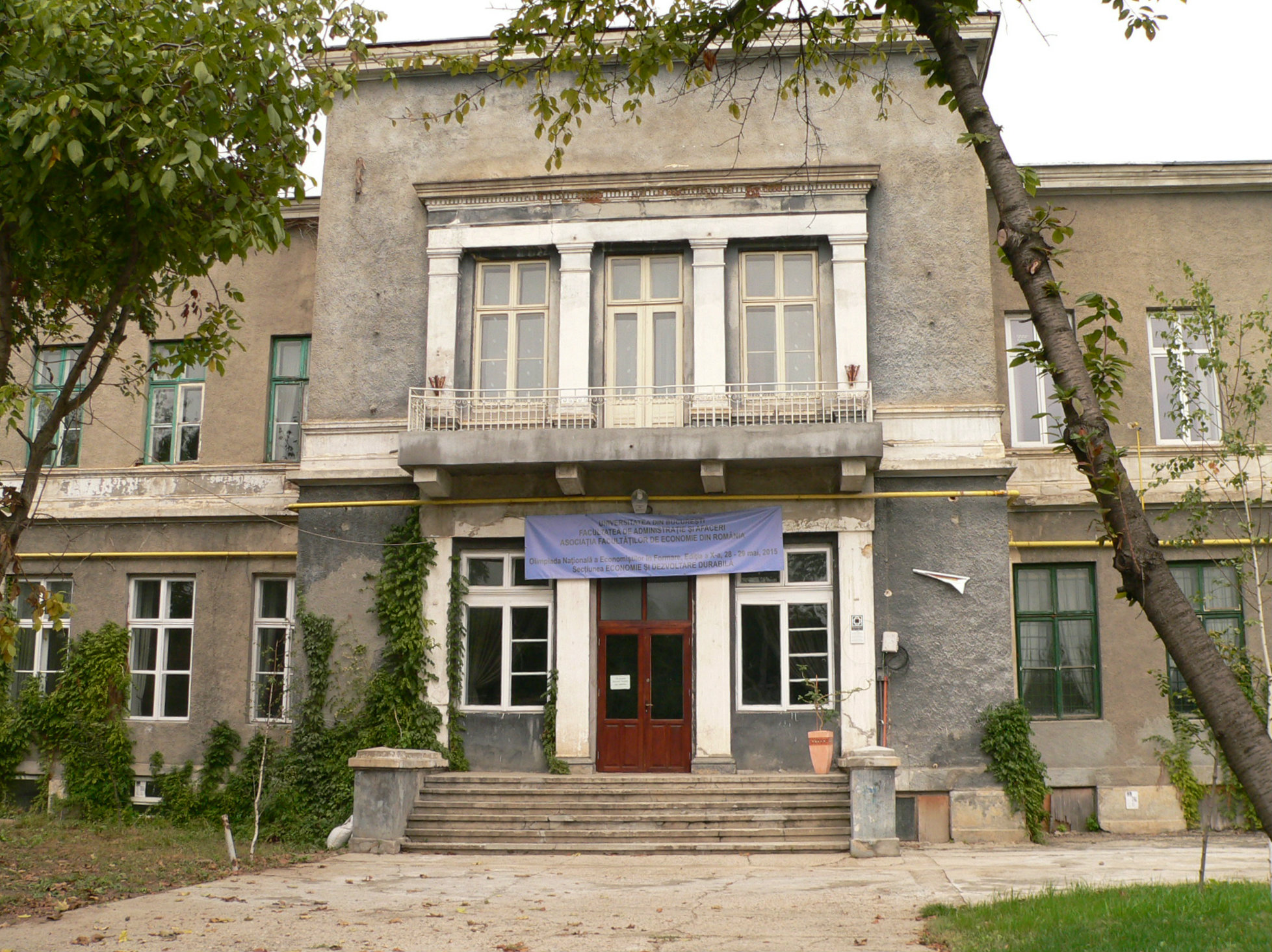
Neoclassical - Elena Doamna Asylum (Șoseaua Panduri no. 90-92), Bucharest, 1862–1865, unknown architect

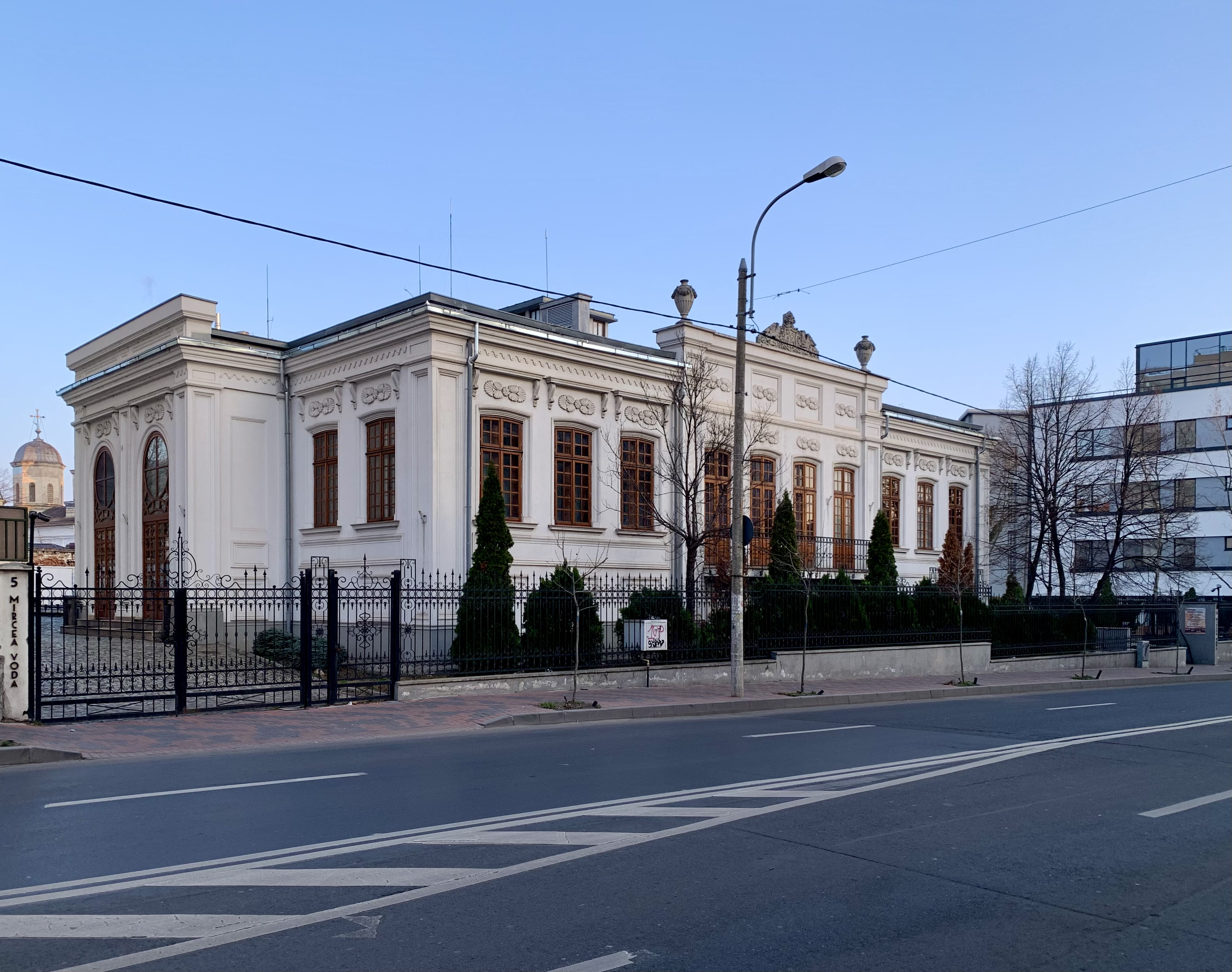
Neoclassical - Eliad House (Bulevardul Mircea Vodă no. 5), Bucharest, 1863, unknown architect

During the reign of Alexandru Ioan Cuza between 1859 and 1866, Neoclassicism and a form Gothic Revival (known as Local/Wallachian Gothic Revival) were the dominant styles. Buildings from this period are quite rare, most of the city centres from the Old Kingdom being primarily built between 1866 and 1914, during the reign of king Carol I of Romania, who ruled Romania after the abdication of Cuza.

During the mid and late 19th century, the Gothic Revival style appears in Romania too, as a manifestation of Romanticism. In general, Romanticist artists, not just architects, saw the Middle Ages as a fantastical era. Thus, the adoption of Gothic Revival architecture seems very normal for Romanticists in Western Europe. This isn't the case for Romanticists in Russia and in Romania. However, the Gothic Revival style spread here too, good examples of this style being the Cezar Librecht House and the Niculescu-Dorobanțu Mansion in Bucharest, but also the Palace of Culture in Iași.

== Carol I's reign (1866-1914) and the Belle Époque (1877–1916) ==
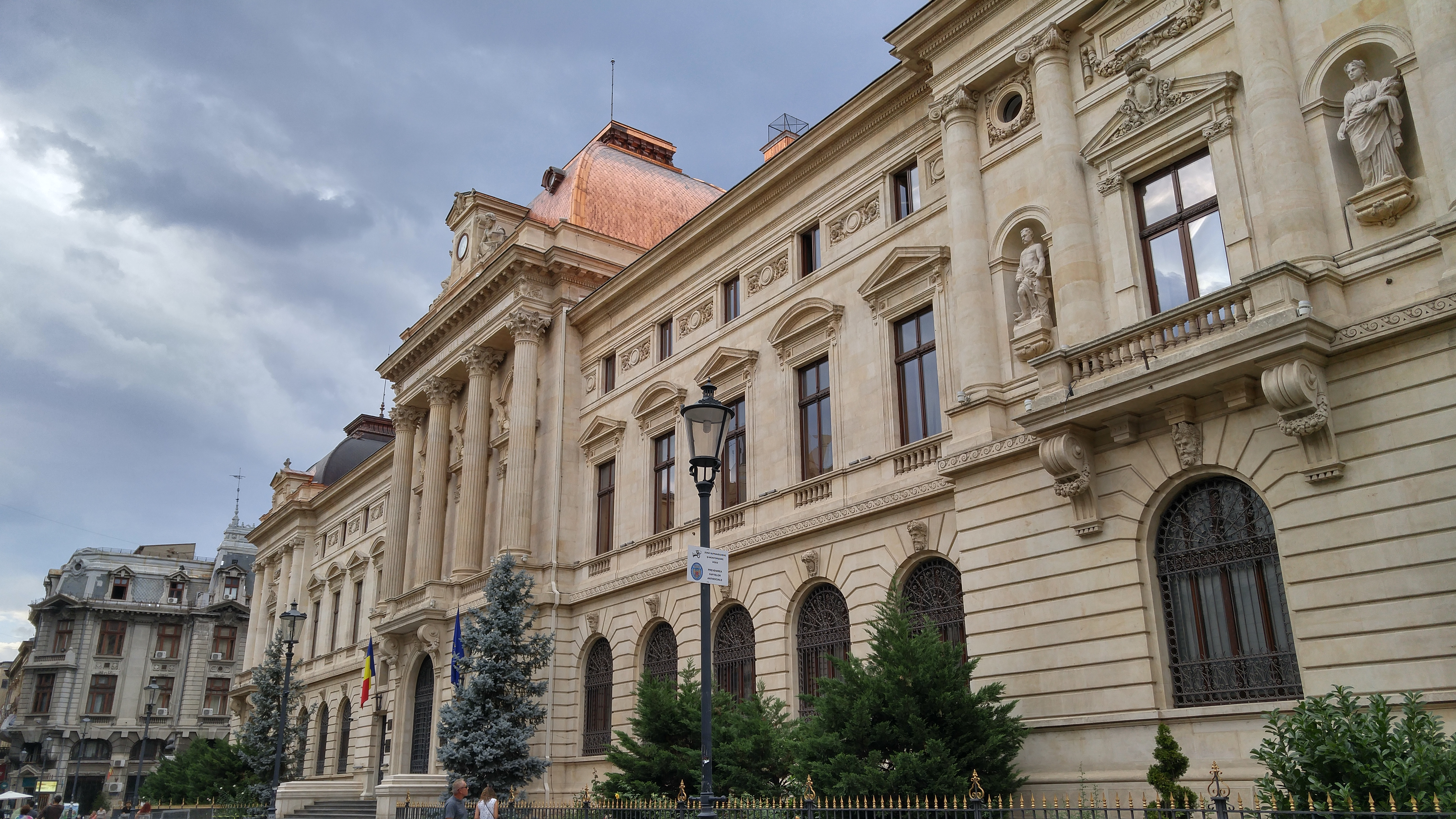
Beaux-Arts aka Eclectic - Exterior of the Old National Bank of Romania Palace, Bucharest, 1883–1900, by Joseph-Marie Cassien Barnard and Albert Galleron, assisted by Grigore Cerkez and Constantin Băicoianu

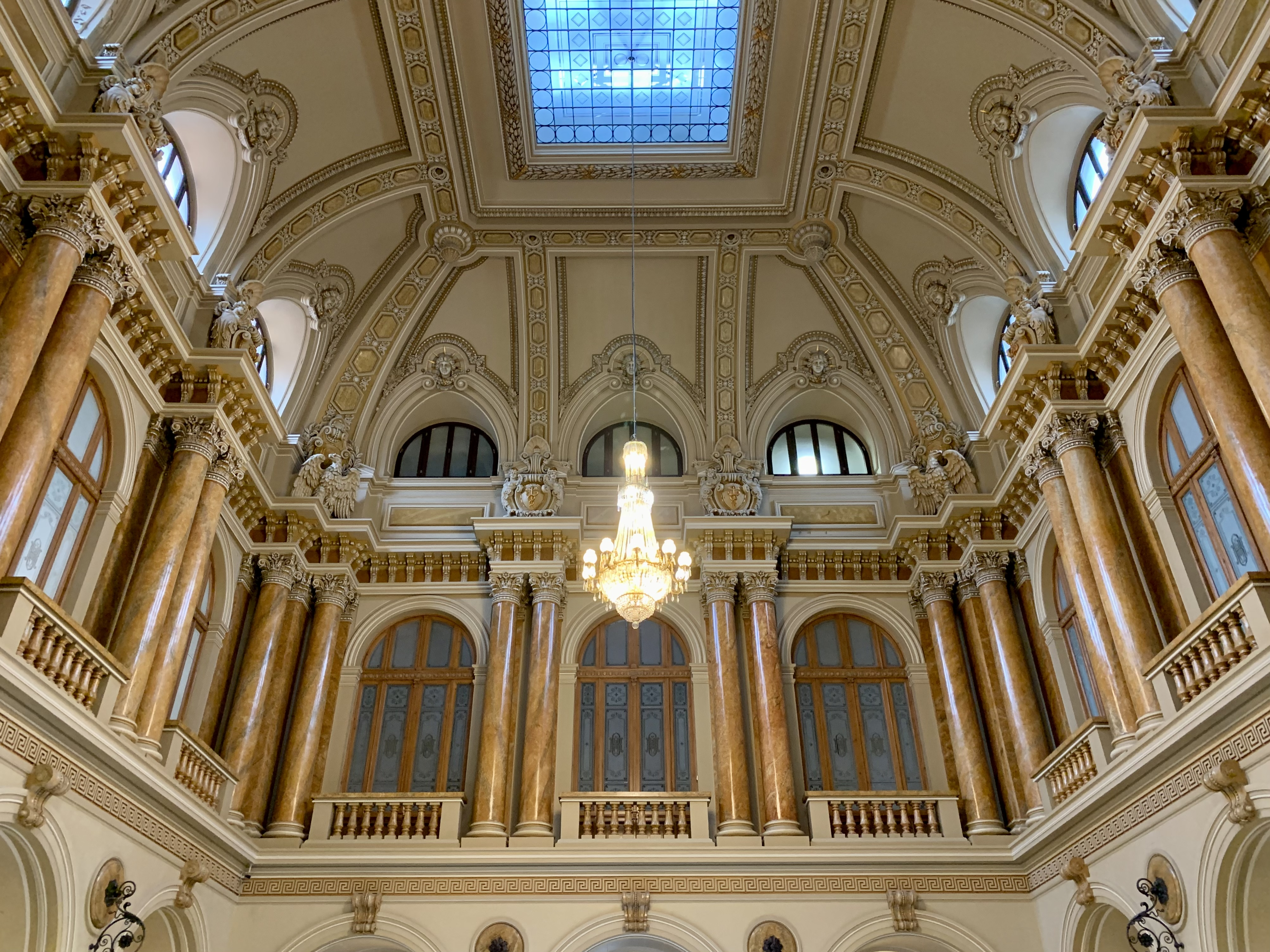
Beaux-Arts aka Eclectic - Interior of the Old National Bank of Romania Palace, Bucharest, 1883–1900, by Joseph-Marie Cassien Barnard and Albert Galleron, assisted by Grigore Cerkez and Constantin Băicoianu

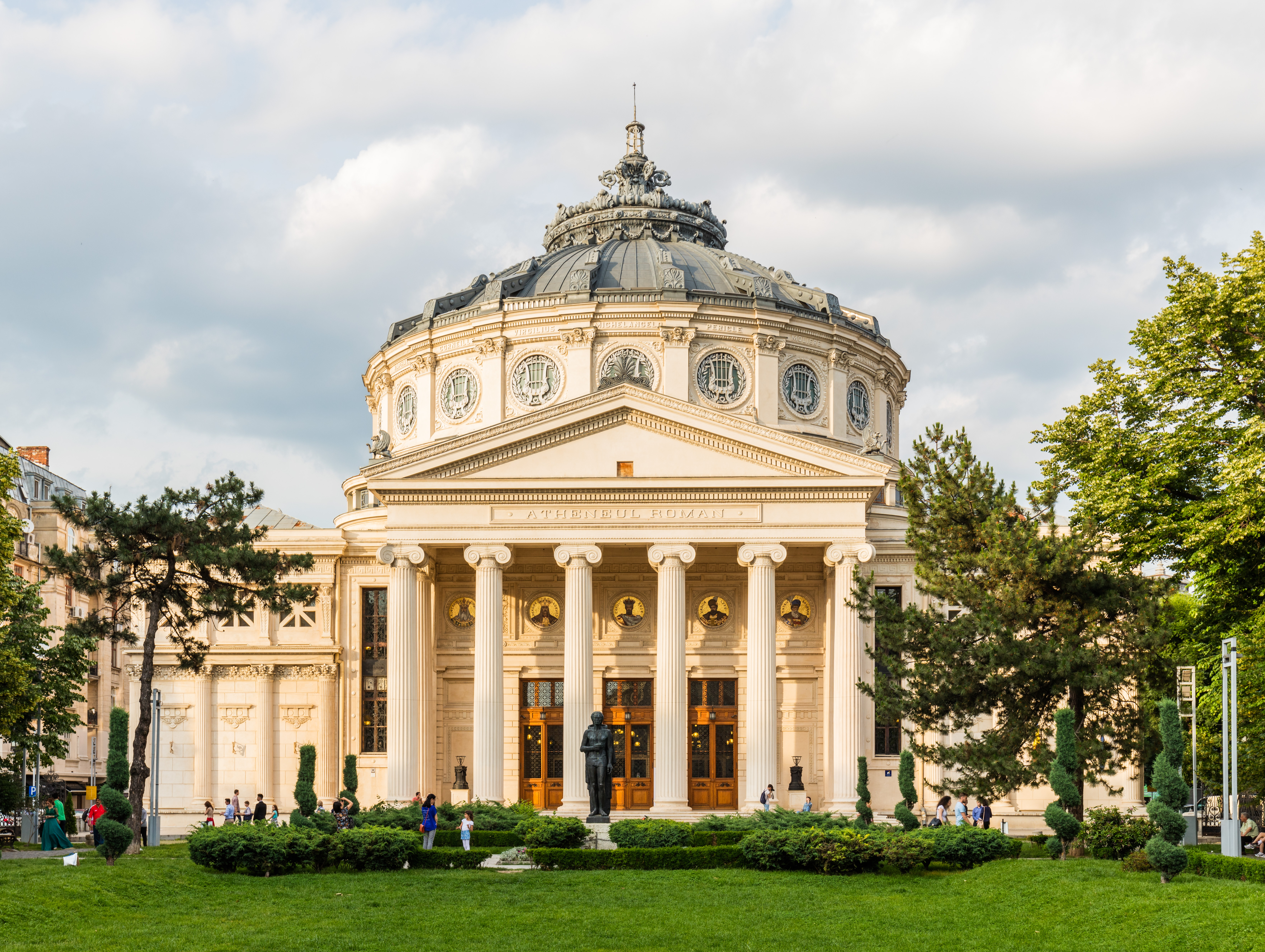
Beaux-Arts aka Eclectic - Romanian Athenaeum on Calea Victoriei, Bucharest, 1886–1895, by Albert Galleron

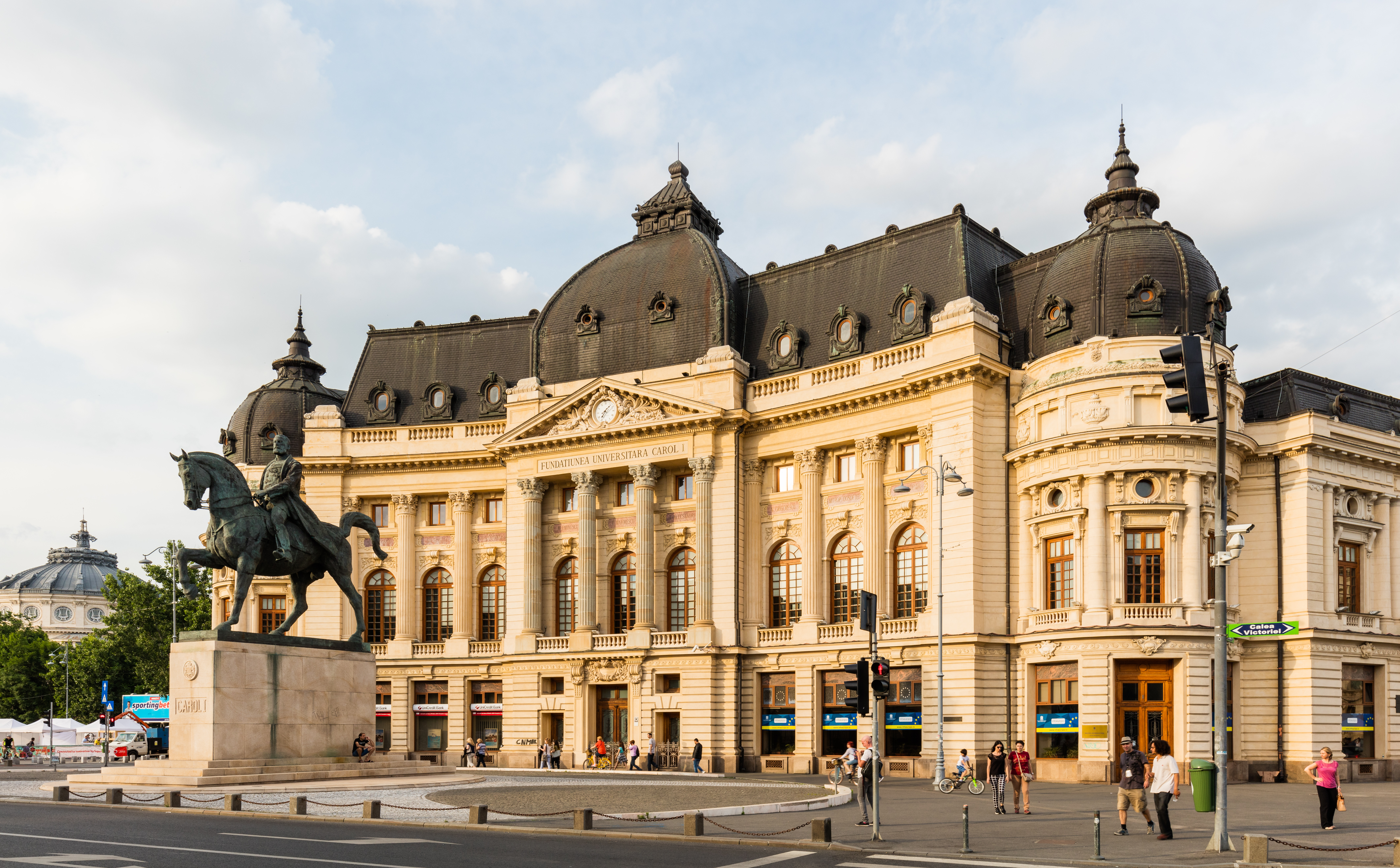
Beaux-Arts aka Eclectic - Central University Library on Calea Victoriei, 1891–1895, by Paul Gottereau

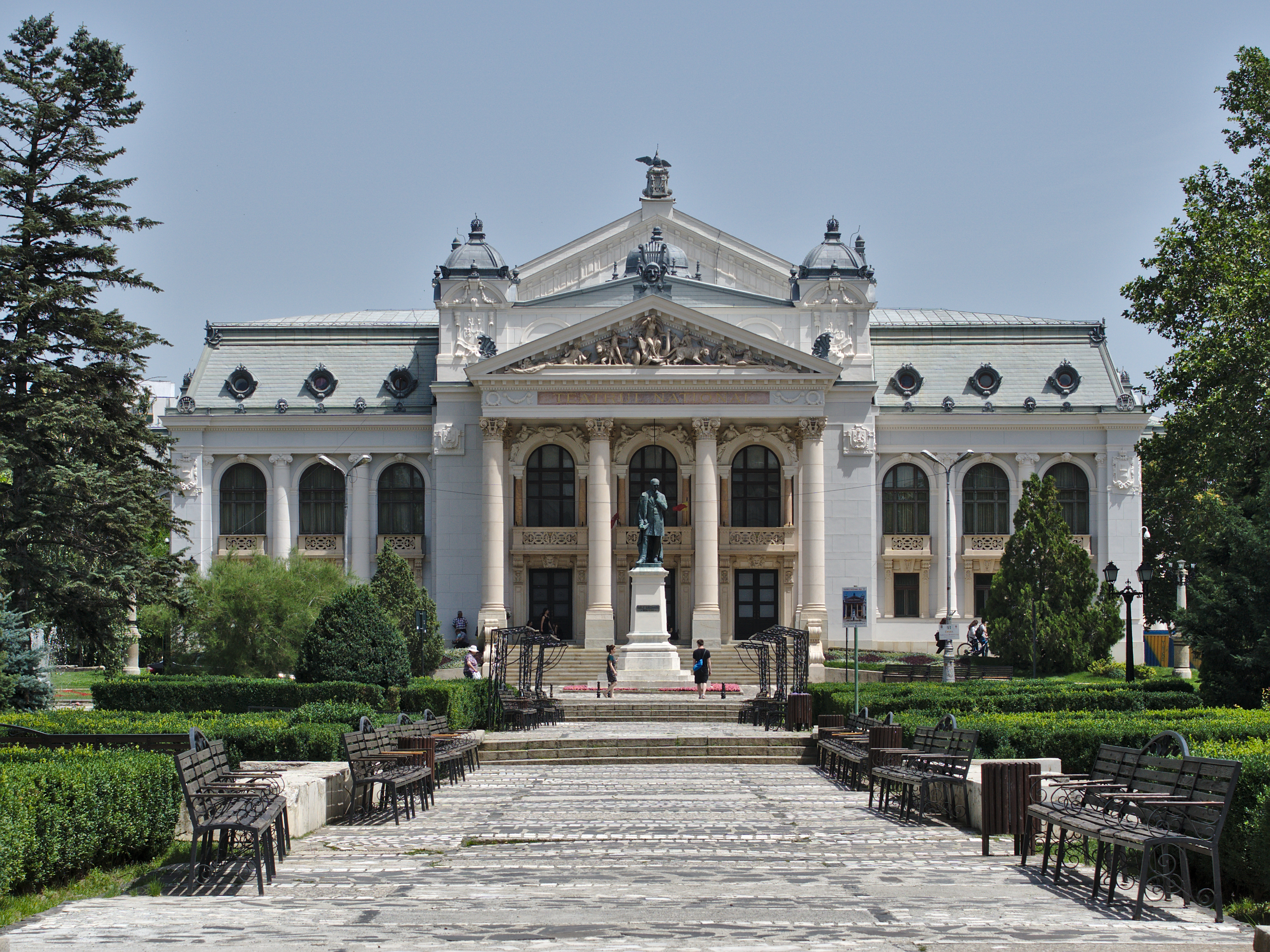
Beaux-Arts aka Eclectic - Iași National Theatre, Iași, 1894–1896, by Fellner & Helmer

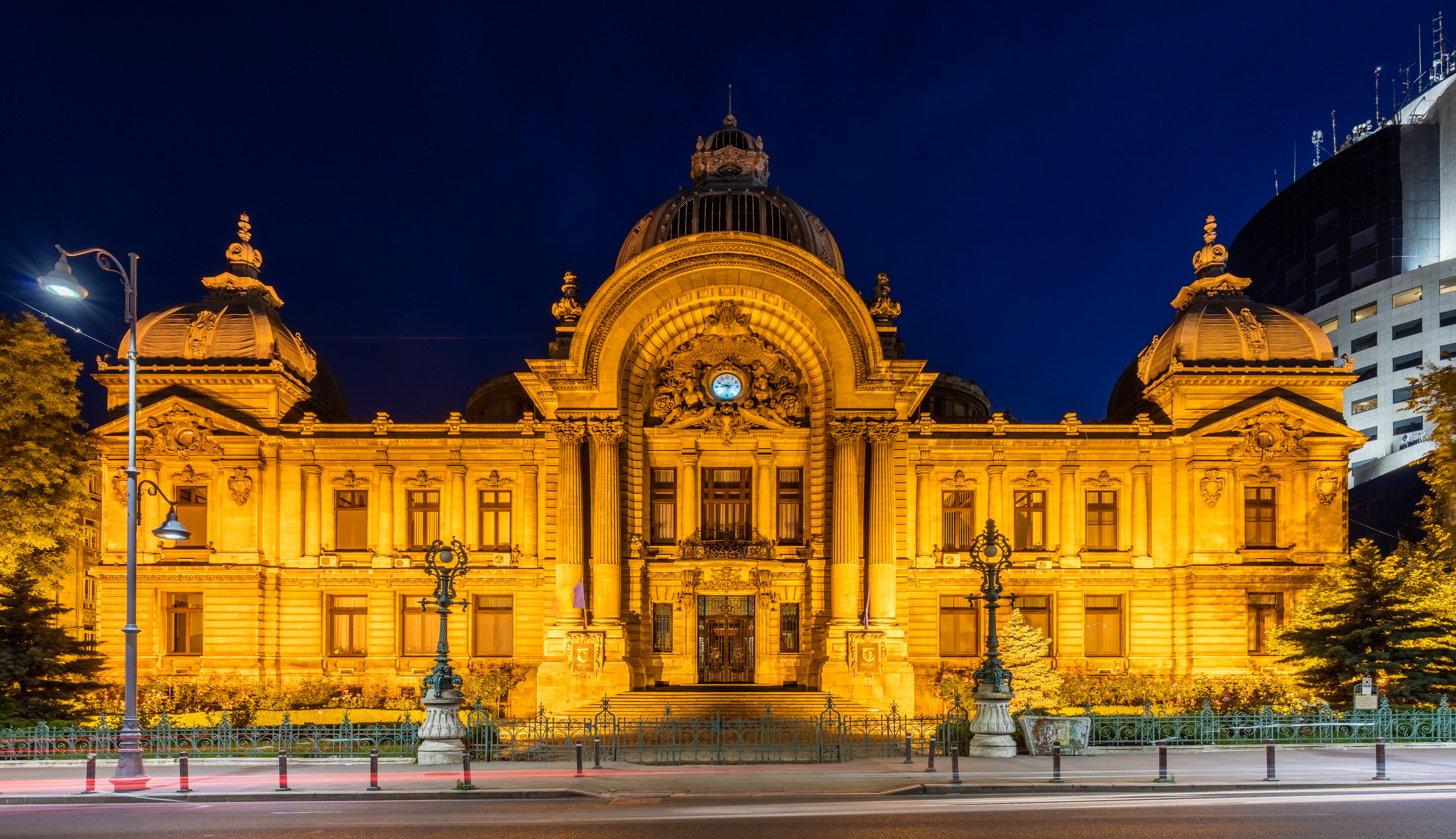
Beaux-Arts aka Eclectic - CEC Palace on Calea Victoriei, 1897–1900, by Paul Gottereau (project) and Ion Socolescu (construction)

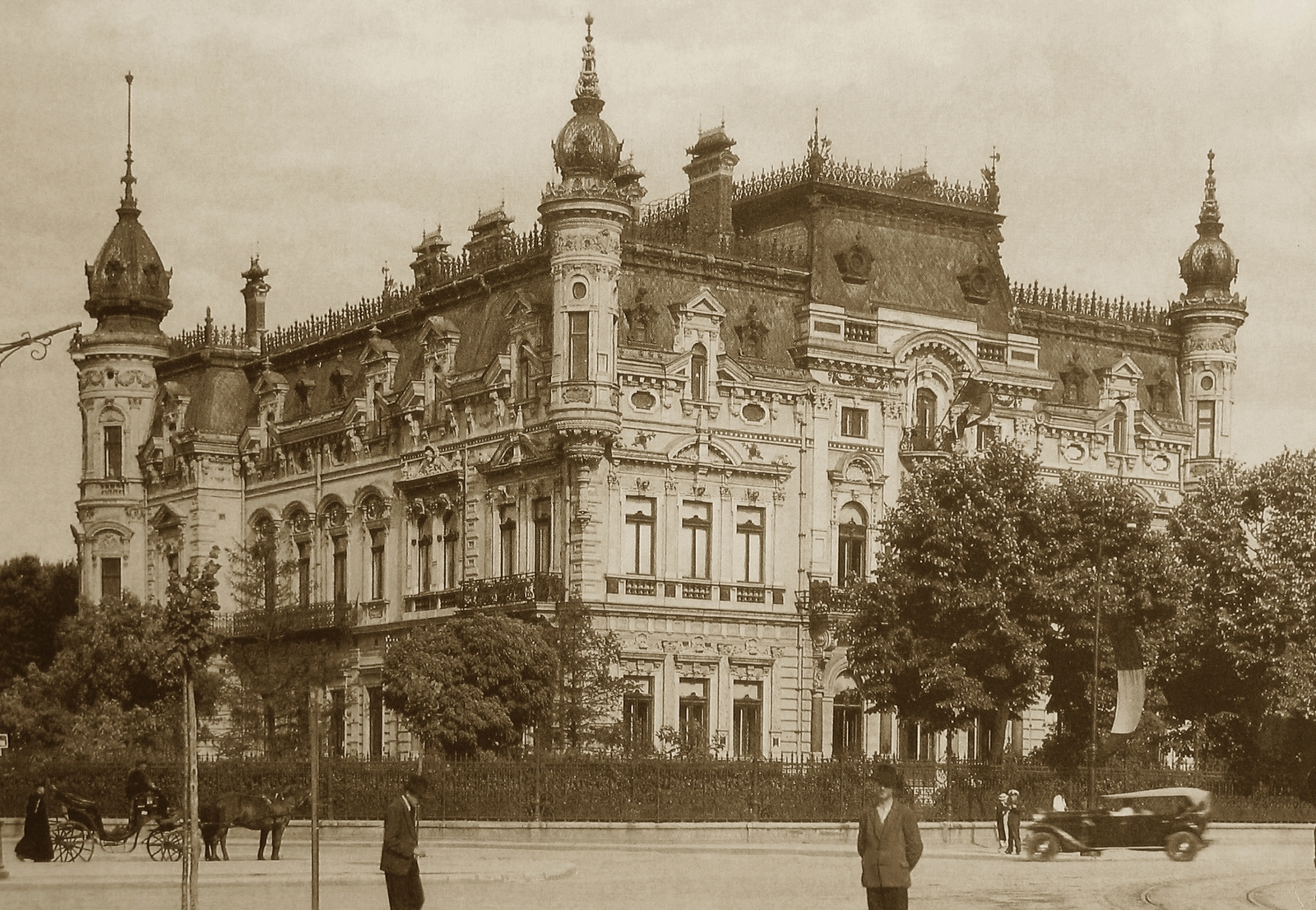
Beaux-Arts aka Eclectic - Sturdza Palace in the Victory Square, Bucharest, 1898-1901-destroyed by WW2 bombardments, by Iulius Reinicke

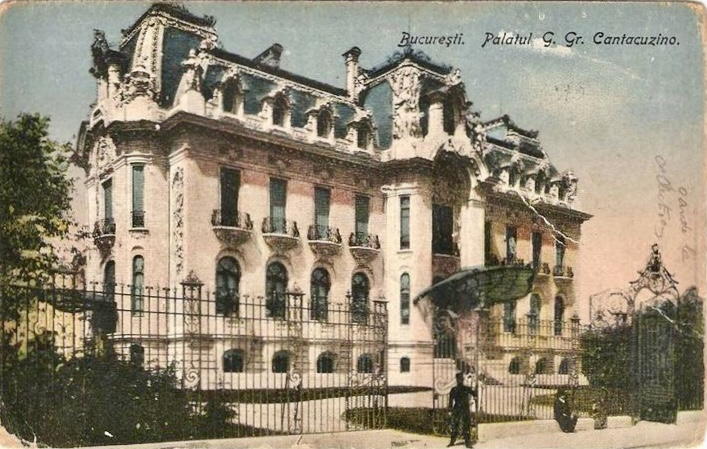
Beaux-Arts aka Eclectic - Gheorghe Grigore Cantacuzino (aka Nababul) Palace on Calea Victoriei, 1898–1906, by Ion D. Berindey

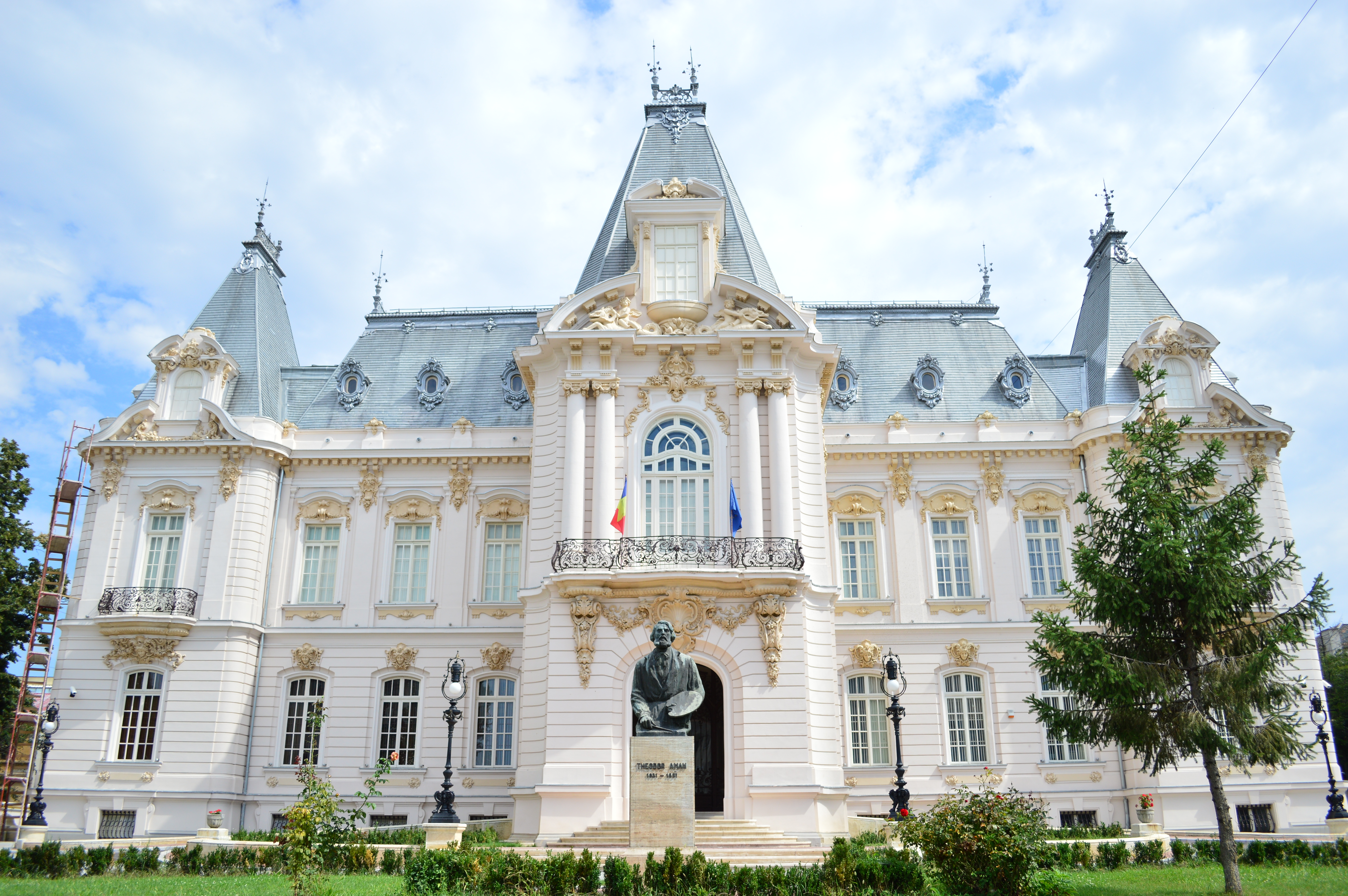
Beaux-Arts aka Eclectic - Constantin Mihail Palace (currently the Craiova Art Museum), 1898–1907, by Paul Gottereau

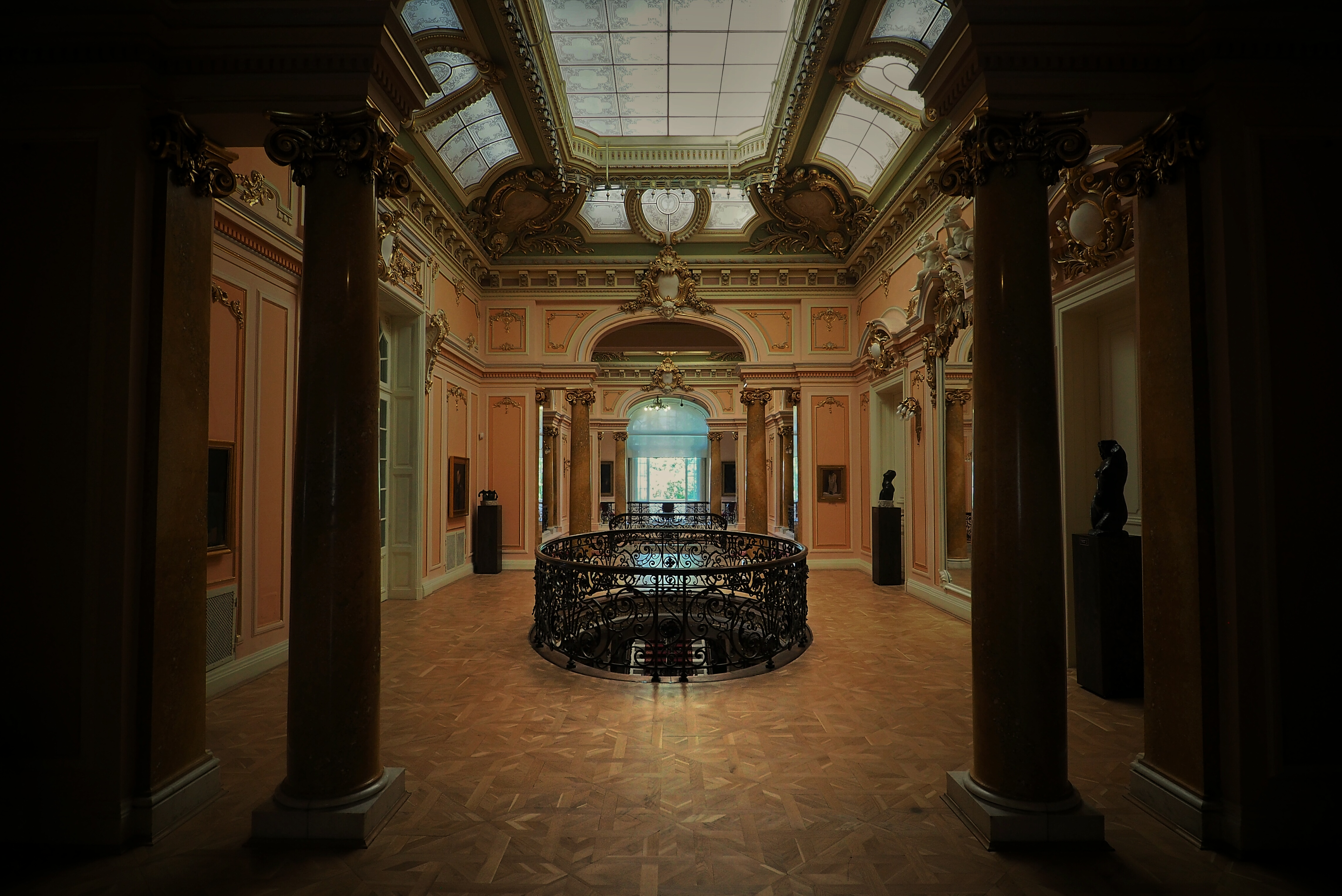
Beaux-Arts aka Eclectic - Interior of the Constantin Mihail Palace, 1898–1907, by Paul Gottereau

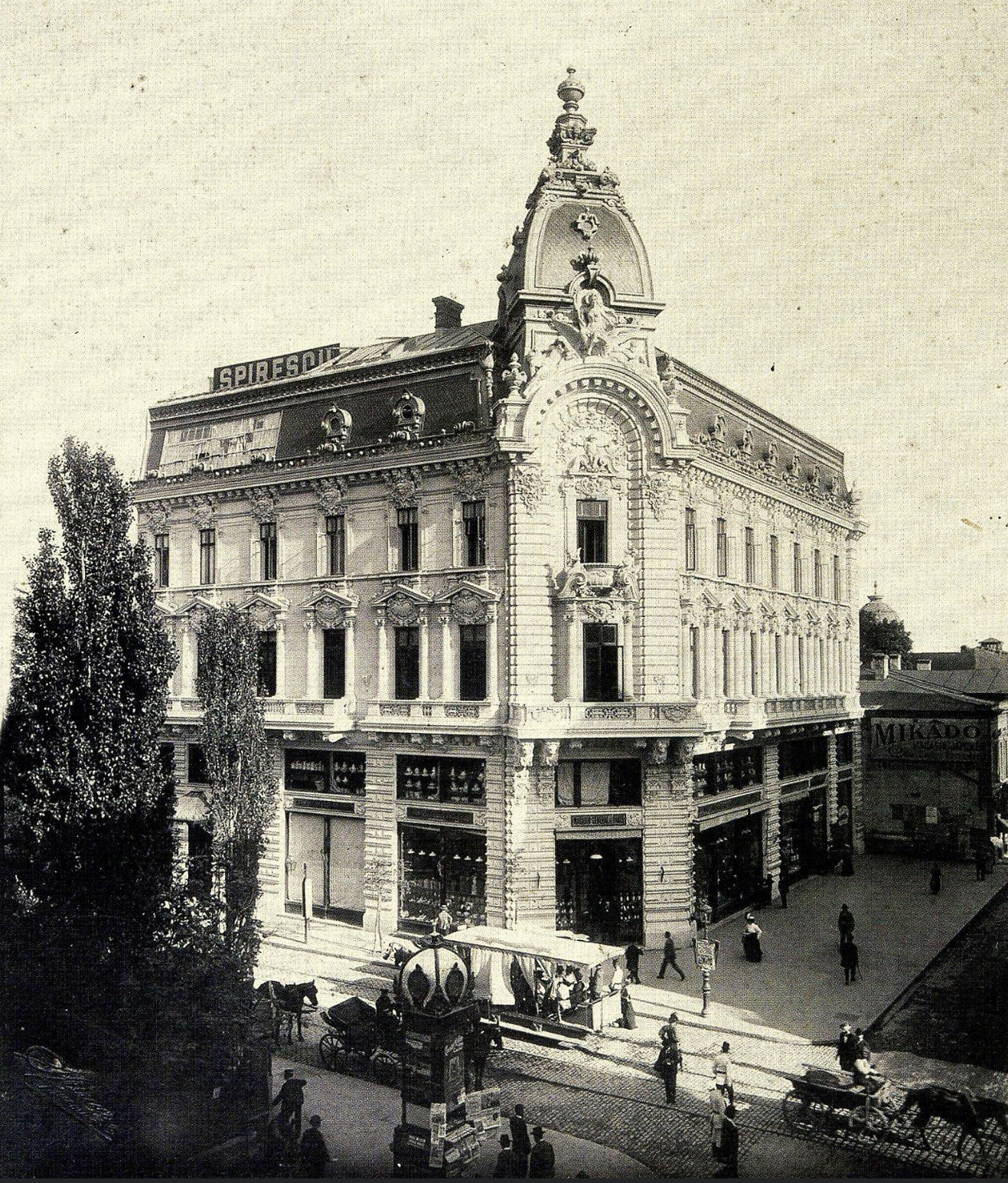
Anker Building on Calea Victoriei, c.1900, by Leonida Negrescu, demolished in April 1939 by Carol II to make space for the Revolution Square

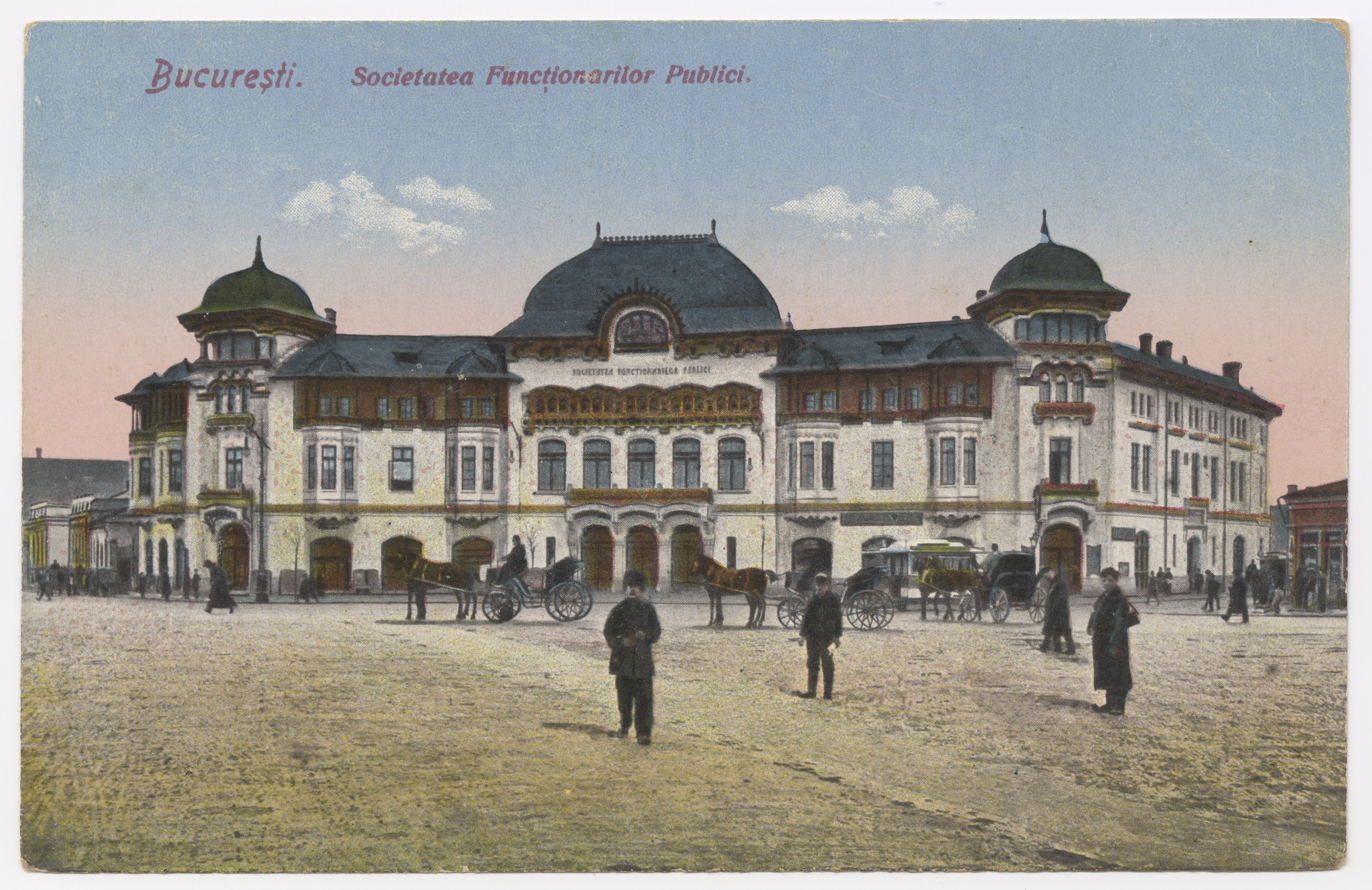
Romanian Revival - Building of the Public Officials Association in the Victory Square, Bucharest, 1900-destroyed by WW2 bombardments in 1944, by Nicolae Mihăescu

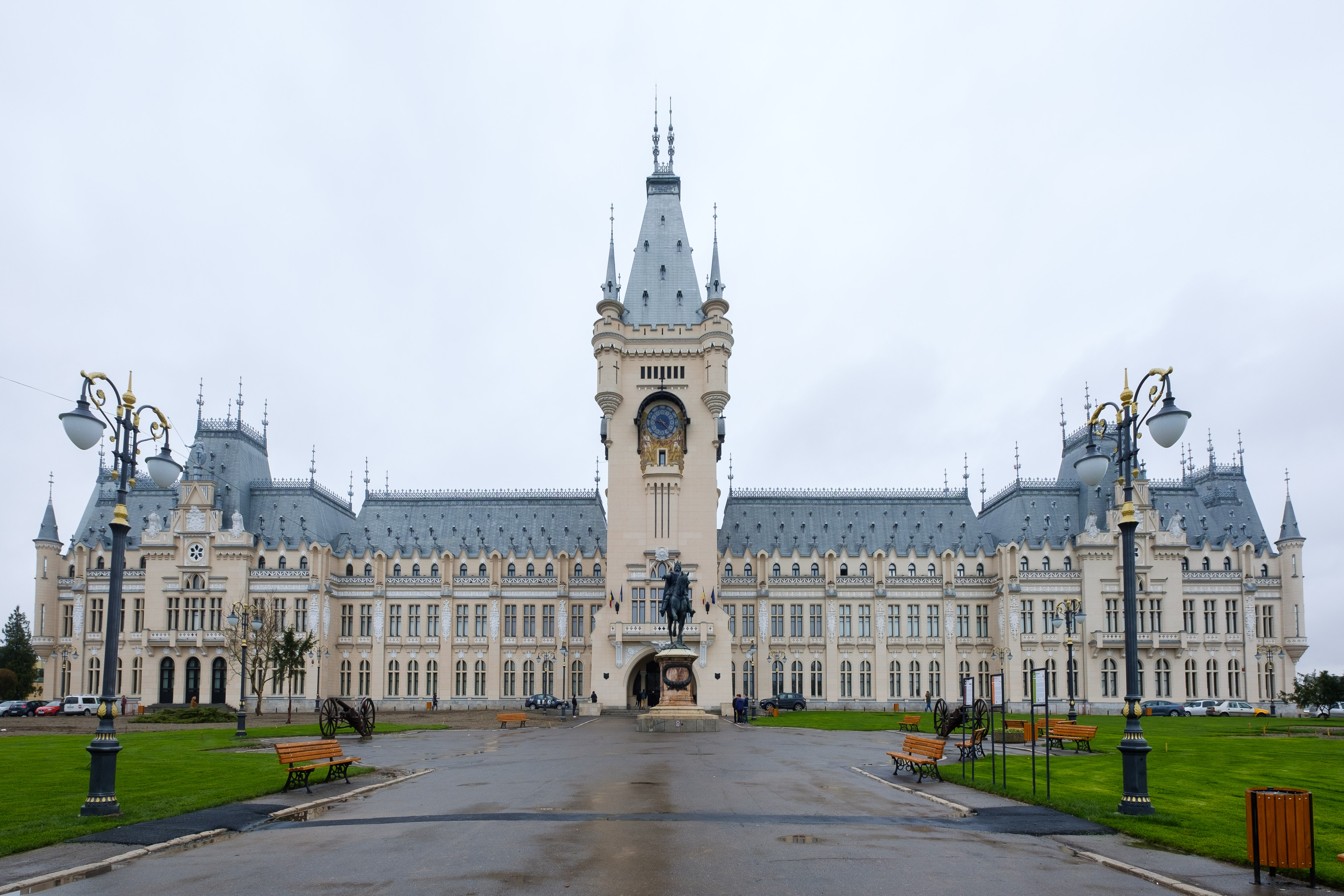
Gothic Revival - Palace of Culture, Iași, 1906–1926, by Ion D. Berindei, Filip Xenopol and Grigore Cerchez

Hotel Cișmigiu (Bulevardul Regina Elisabeta no. 38), Bucharest, by Arghir Culina, 1912

More buildings are built during the second half of the 19th century and the first decades of the 20th, as the creation of the new modern Romanian state, after the Unification of Moldavia and Wallachia in 1859, needed new administrative, social-economic and cultural institutions. This way, during a relatively short period, some administrative palaces had to be built, not just the governmental ones, but also smaller communal palaces in different cities, and also private homes. Many of them were built in the Classicist style, like the Romanian Athenaeum on Calea Victoriei (Bucharest).

Towards the end of the century, many administrative buildings and private homes are built in a style known as «Beaux-Arts» or «Eclectic», brought from France through French architects who came here for work in Romania, schooled in France. The National Bank of Romania Palace on Strada Lipscani, built between 1883 and 1885 is a good example of this style, decorated not just with columns (mainly Ionic), but also with allegorical statues placed in niches, that depict Agriculture, Industry, Commerce and Justice. Because of the popularity of this style, it changed the way Bucharest looks, making it similar in some way with Paris, which led to Bucharest being seen as "Little Paris". Eclecticism was very popular not just in Bucharest and Iași, the two biggest cities, but also in smaller ones like Craiova, Caracal, Râmnicu Vâlcea, Pitești, Ploiești, Buzău, Botoșani, Piatra Neamț etc. This style was used not only for administrative palaces and big houses of wealthy people, but also for middle-class homes.

Industrialization brought some engineering feats such as the King Carol I Bridge (later renamed Anghel Saligny Bridge). Built between 1890 and 1895 in over the Danube, when it was completed it then became the longest bridge in Europe and the third in the world.

=== Residential architecture ===
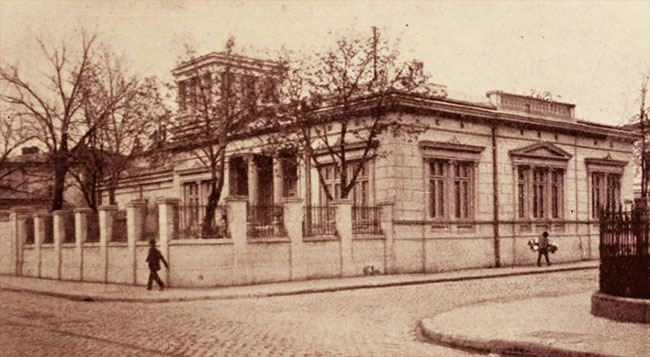
Neoclassical - Titu Maiorescu House, where the meetings of the Junimea literary society were held, Bucharest, unknown architect, c.1870

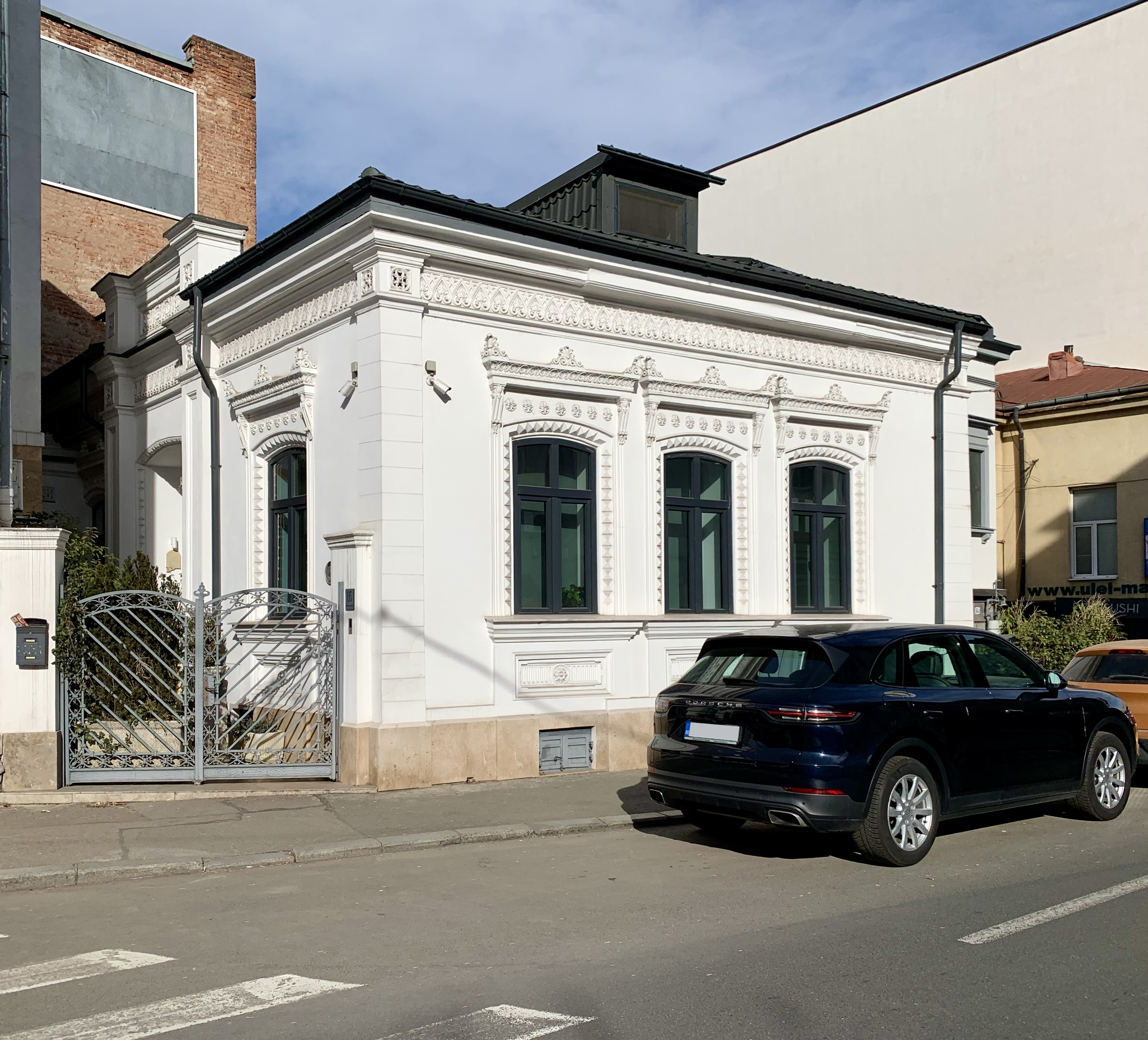
Neoclassical with a few Gothic Revival elements - Tănase Nicolau House, Bucharest, unknown architect, 1870

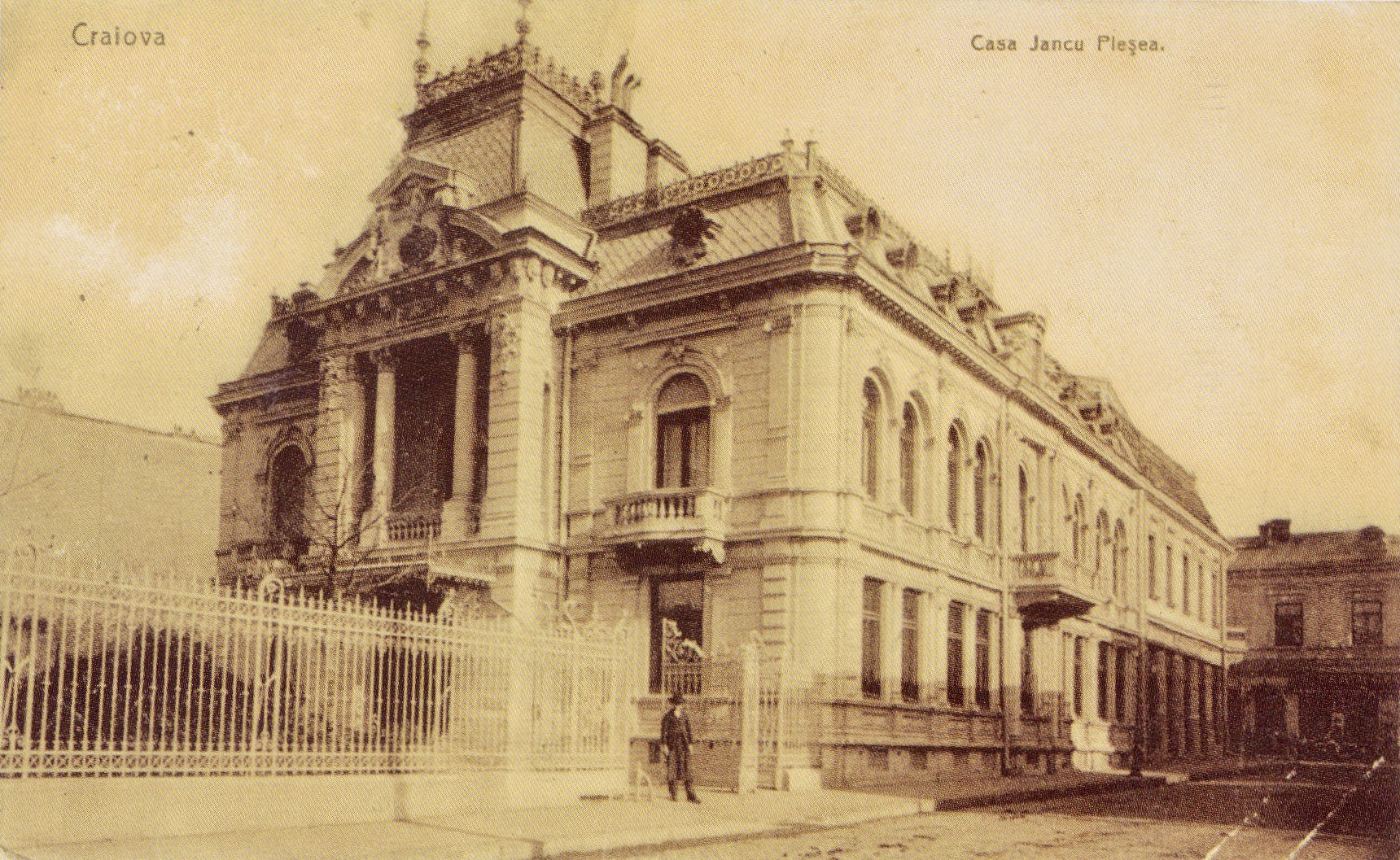
Beaux Arts aka Eclectic - Ionel Pleșia House, Craiova, by Paul Louis Albert Galeron, 1890-1892

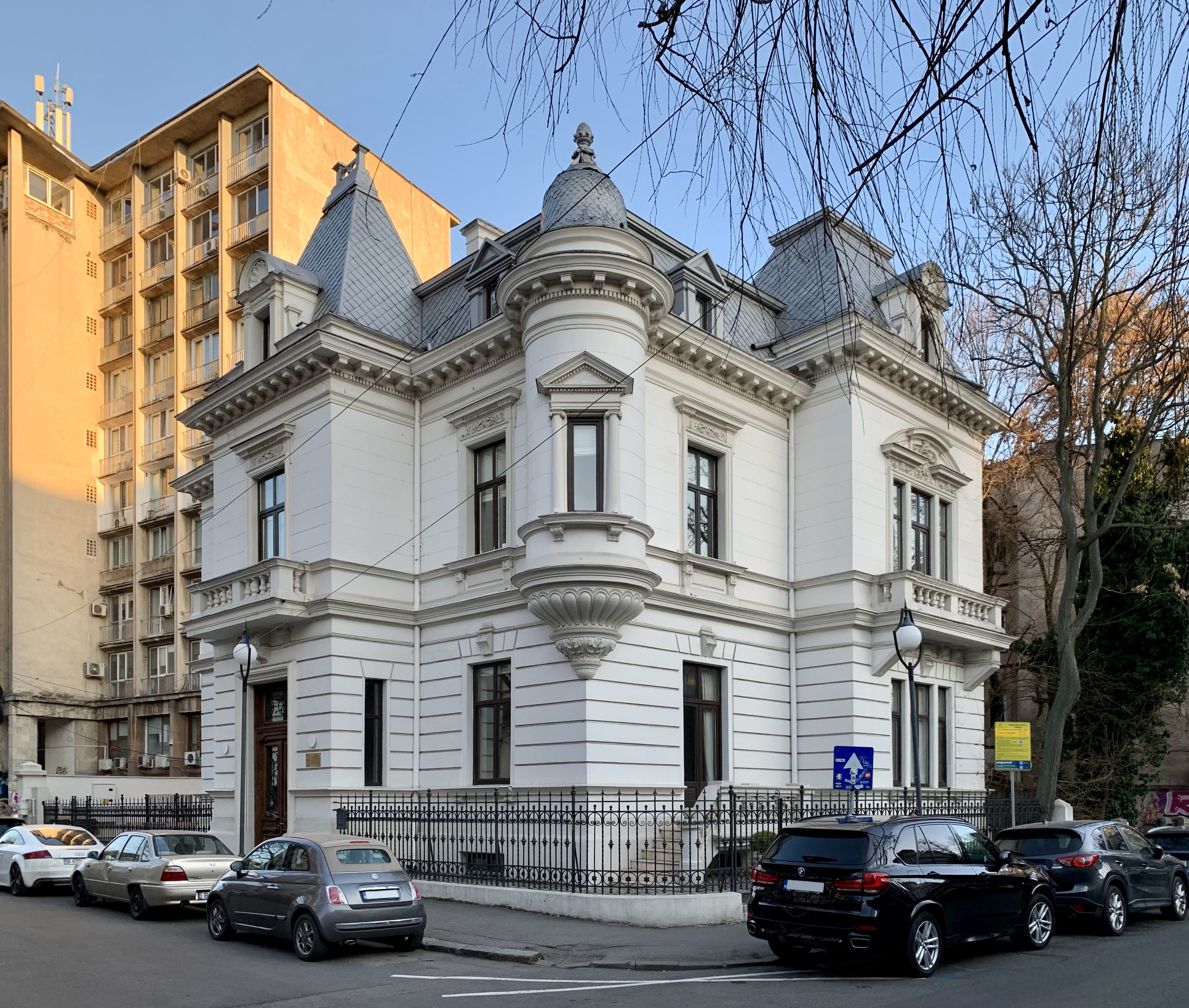
Renaissance Revival - Mitilineu House, Bucharest, by Joseph Schiffeleers, 1898

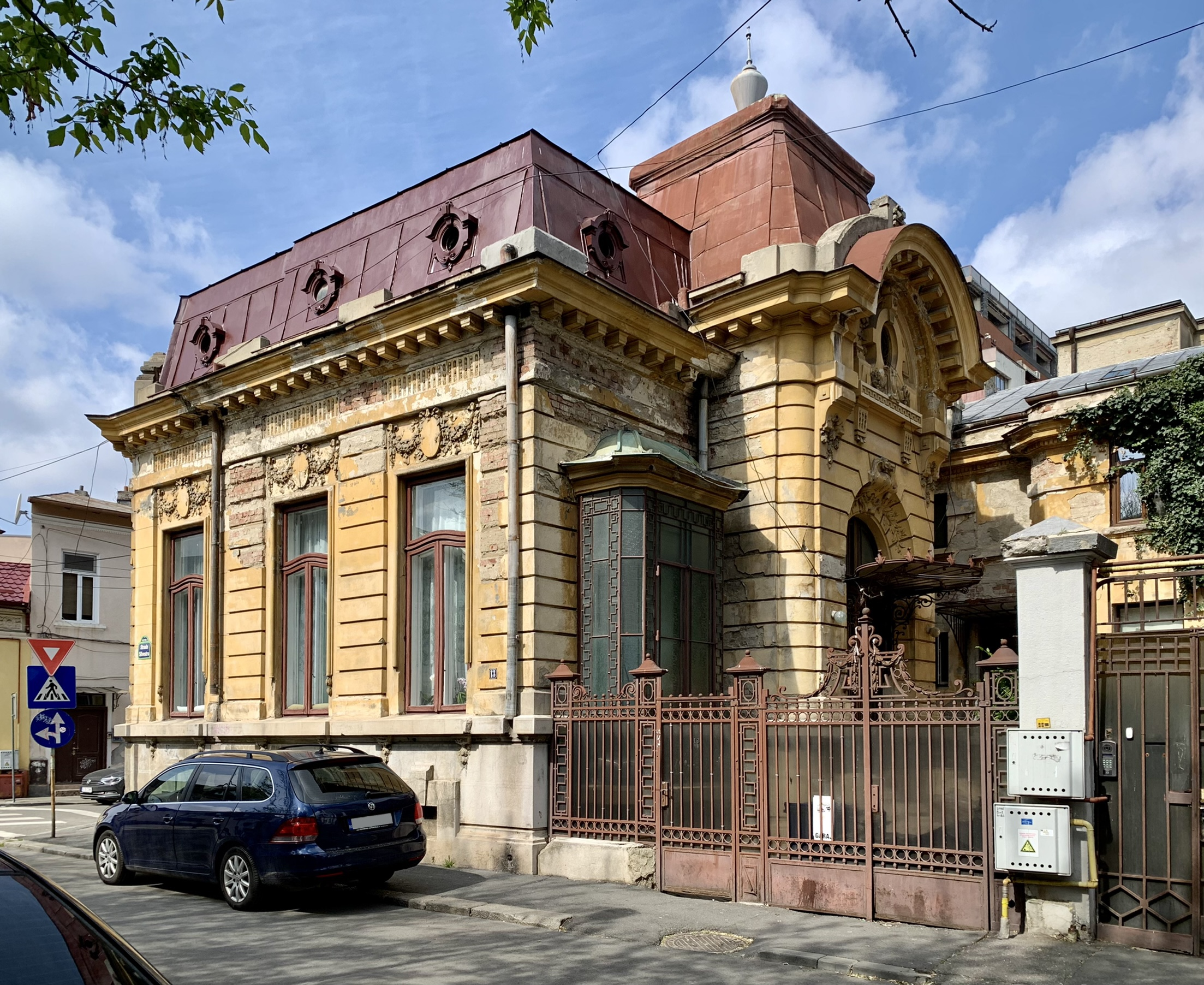
Beaux-Arts aka Eclectic - Strada Silvestru no. 13, Bucharest, unknown architect, c.1900

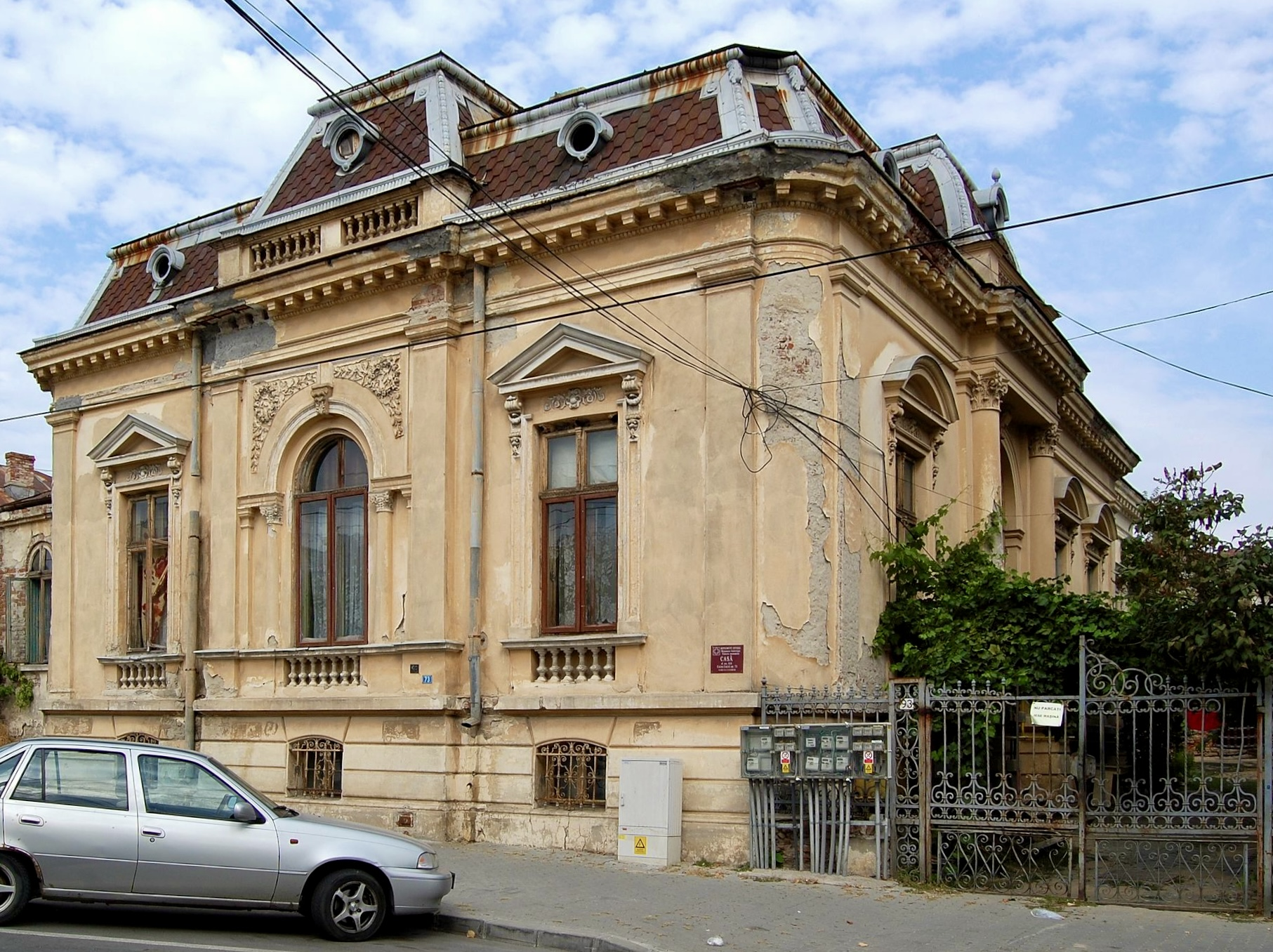
Neoclassical - Calea Unirii no. 73, Craiova, unknown architect, c.1900

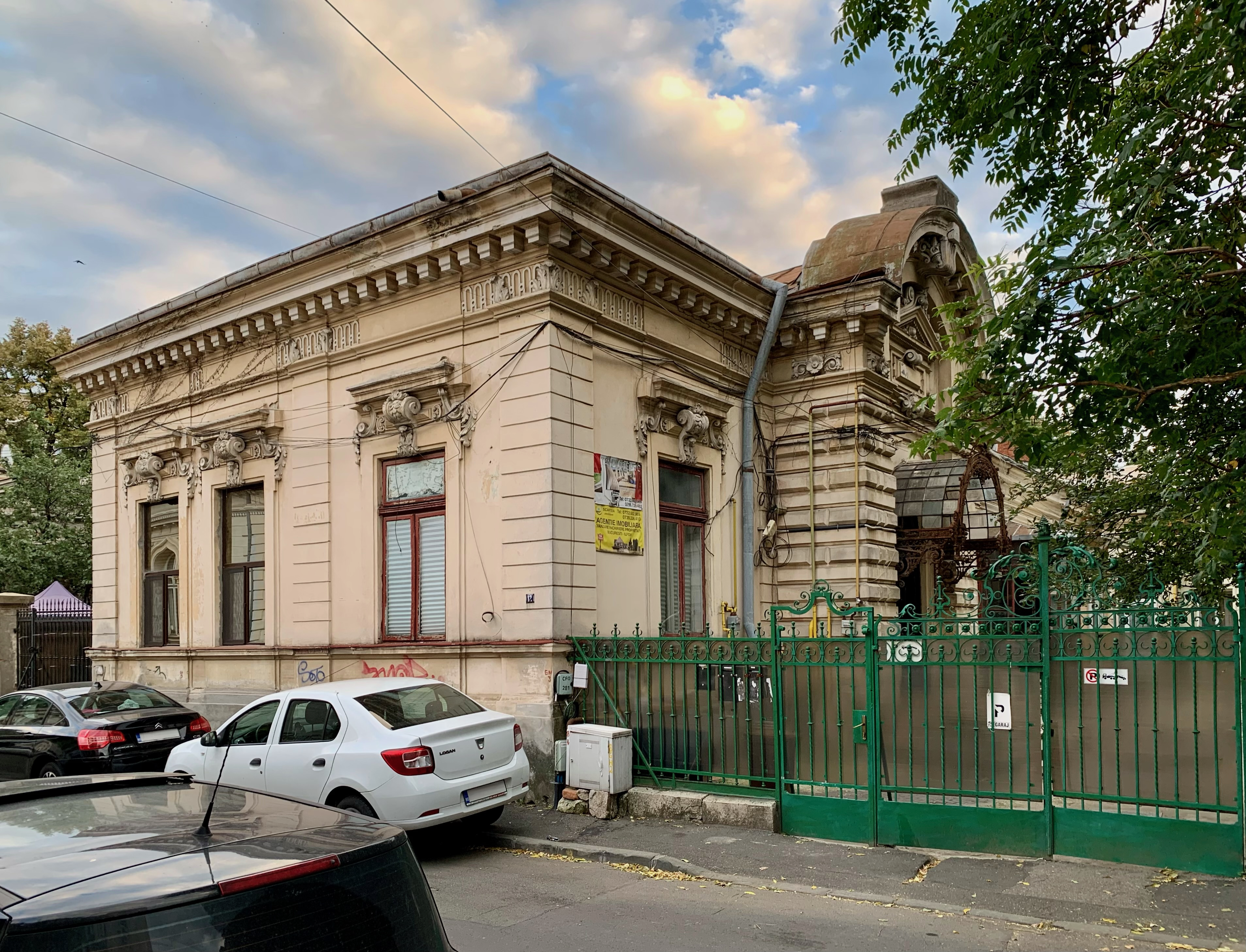
Beaux-Arts aka Eclectic - House of architect Leonida Negrescu, Bucharest, unknown architect, c.1900 (before 1906)

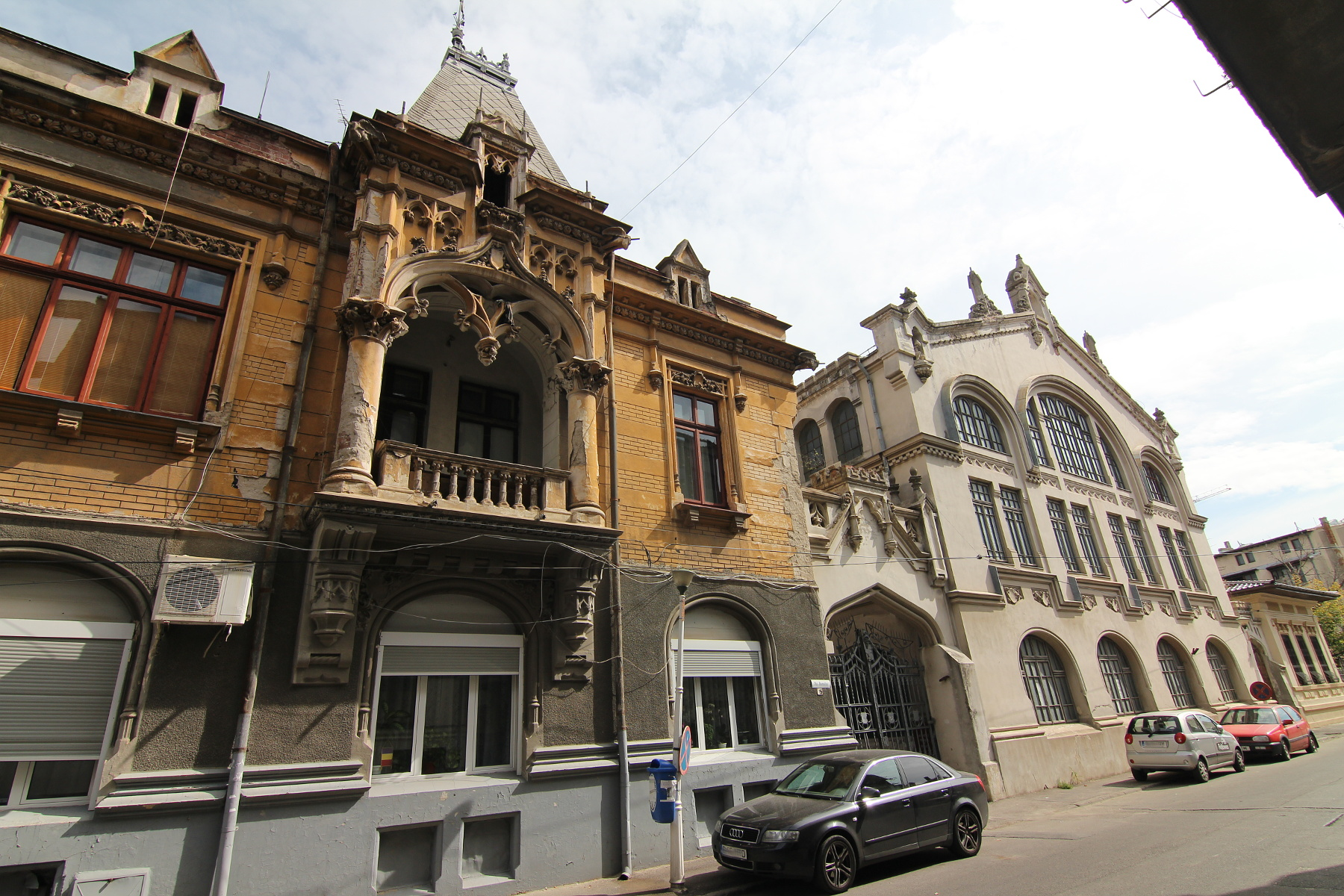
Gothic Revival - Hermann I.Rieber House (left) and carriage factory (right), Bucharest, by Siegfrid Kofczinsky, 1903

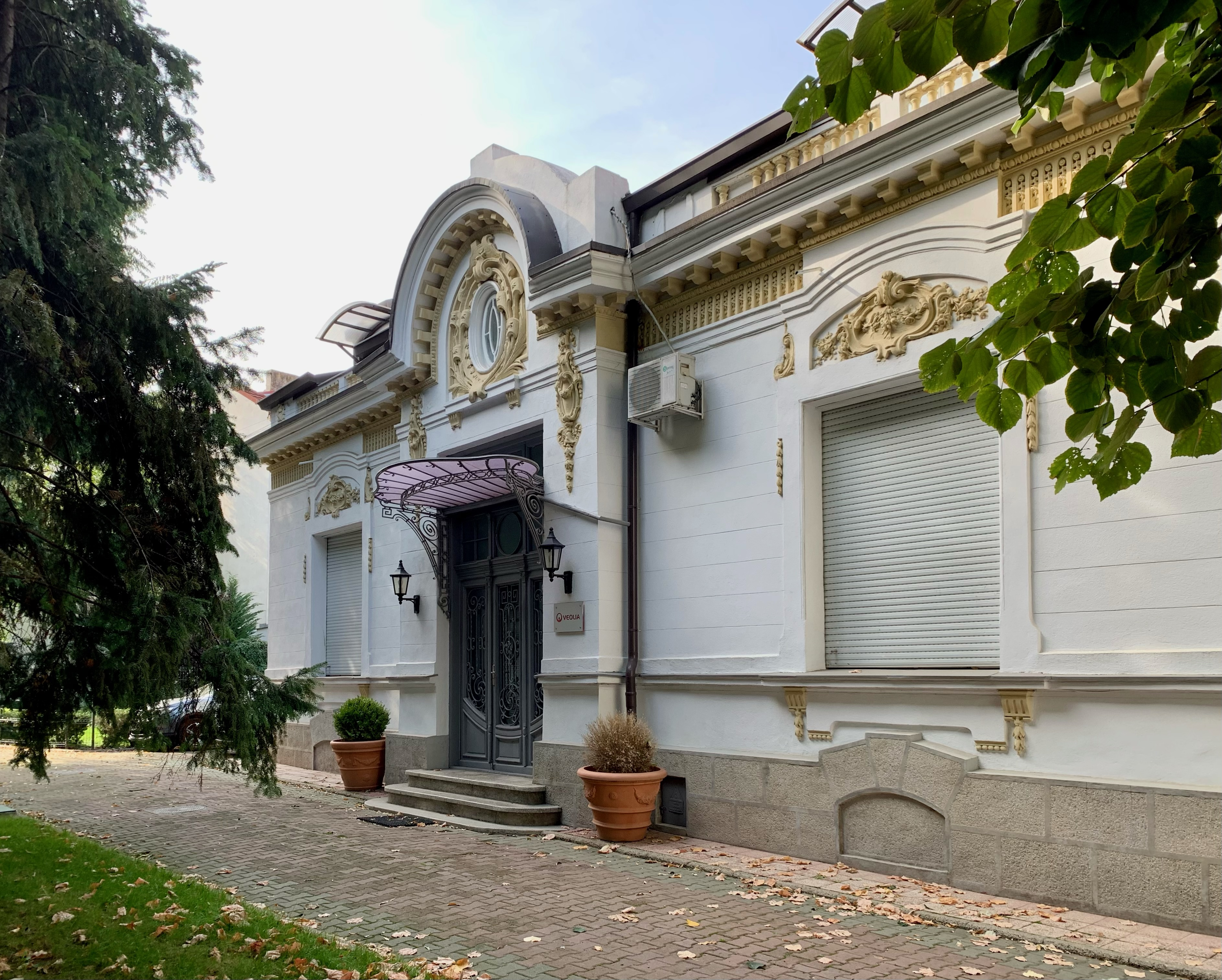
Beaux-Arts aka Eclectic - Strada Profesorilor no. 2, Bucharest, unknown architect, c.1910

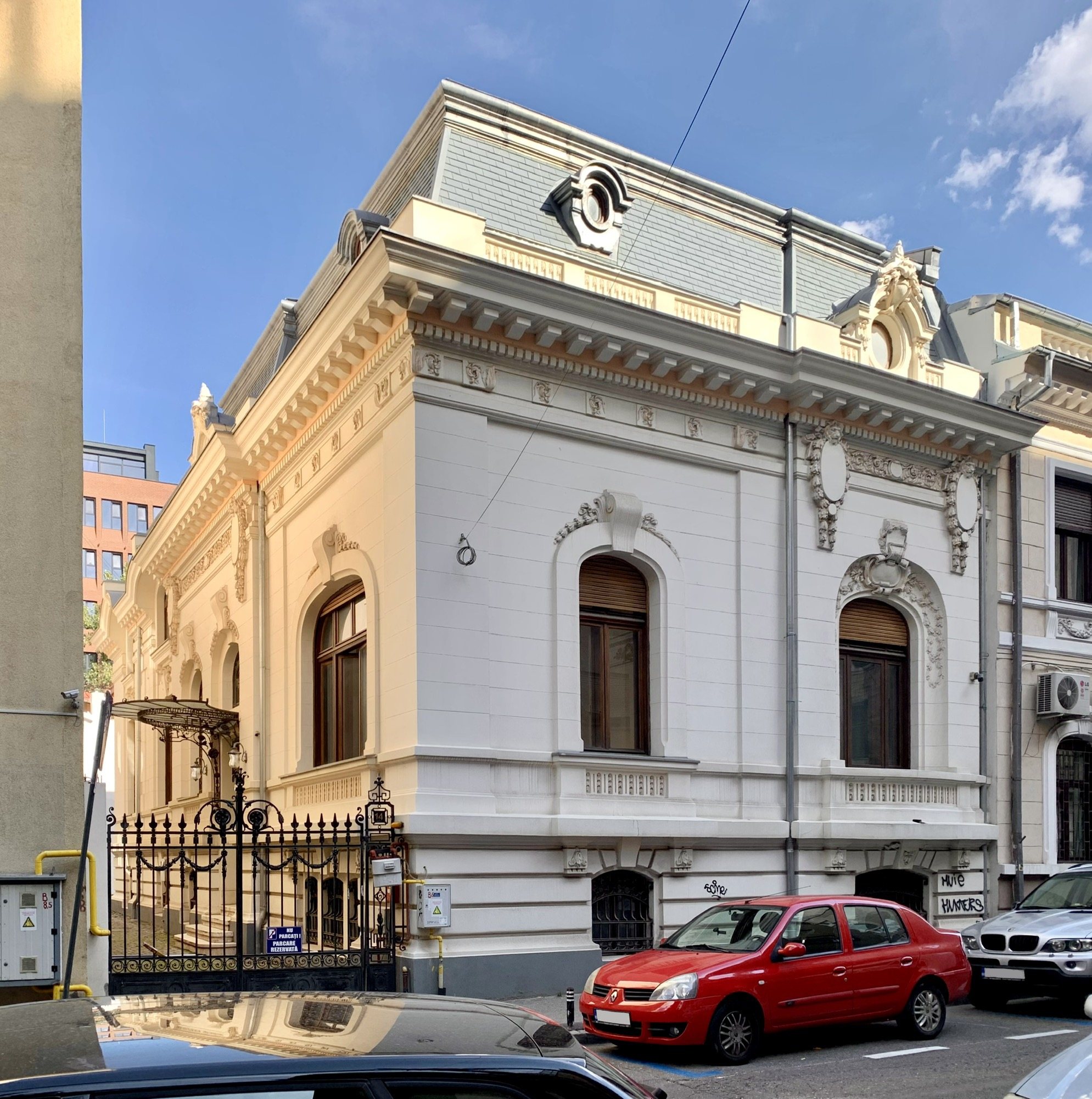
Beaux-Arts aka Eclectic - Strada Vasile Conta no. 14, Bucharest, unknown architect, c.1910

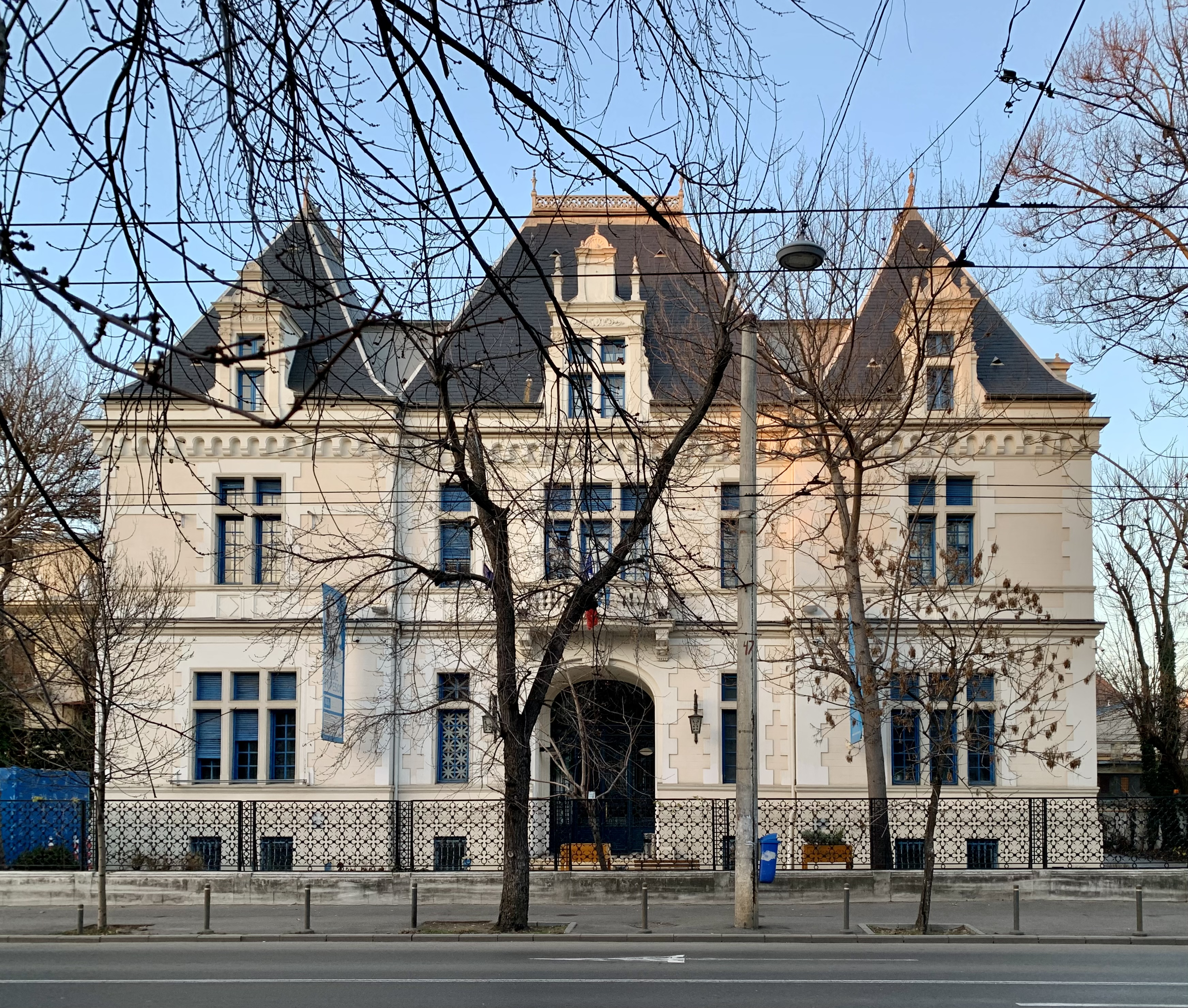
Renaissance Revival - Olănescu House (today the Institut Français de Roumanie) on Bulevardul Dacia, Bucharest, by Oskar Maugsch, 1911-1912

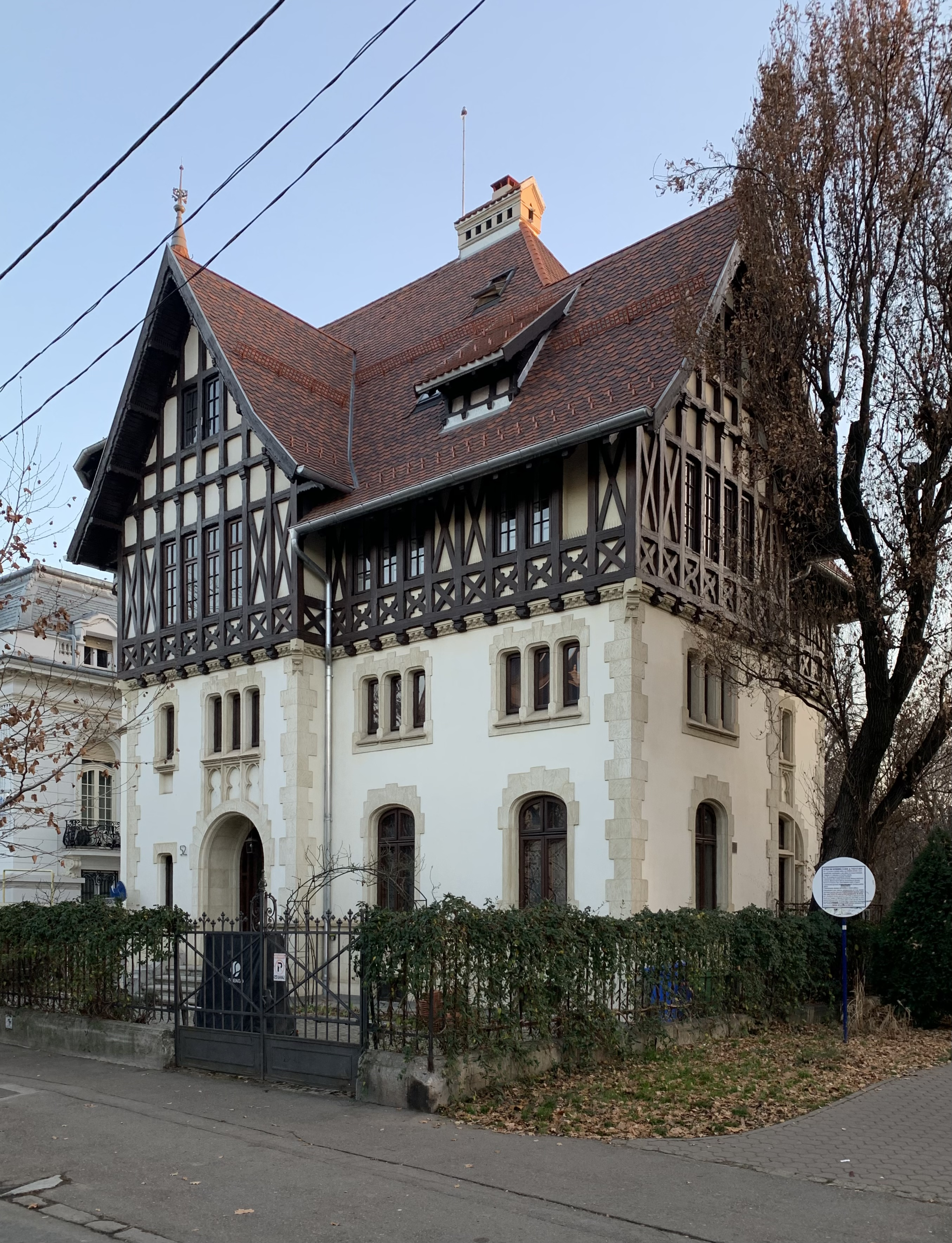
Tudor Revival - Dr. Petre Herescu House on Bulevardul Dacia, Bucharest, by Grigore Cerchez, 1911-1913

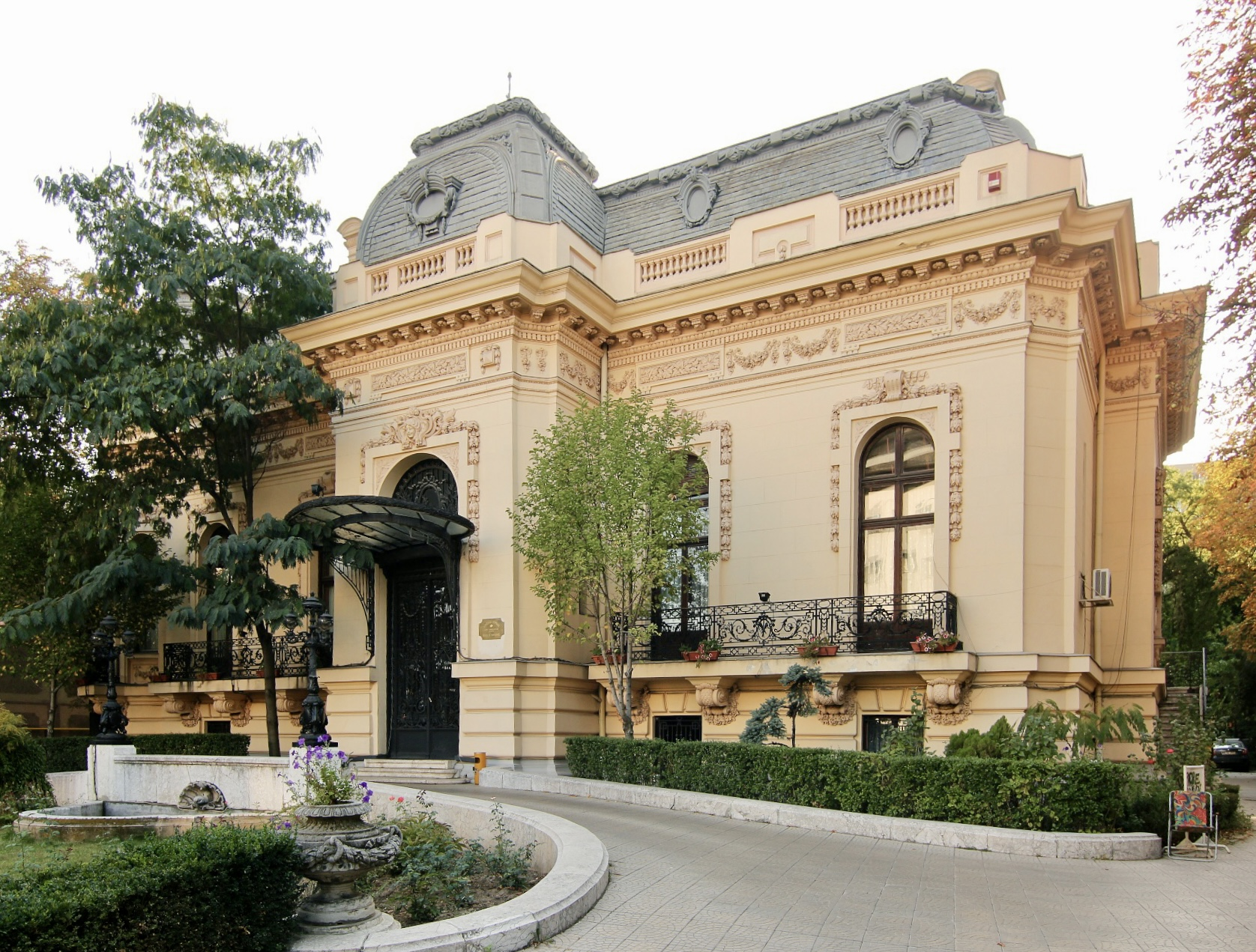
Beaux-Arts aka Eclectic - Assan House, Bucharest, by Ion D. Berindey, 1914

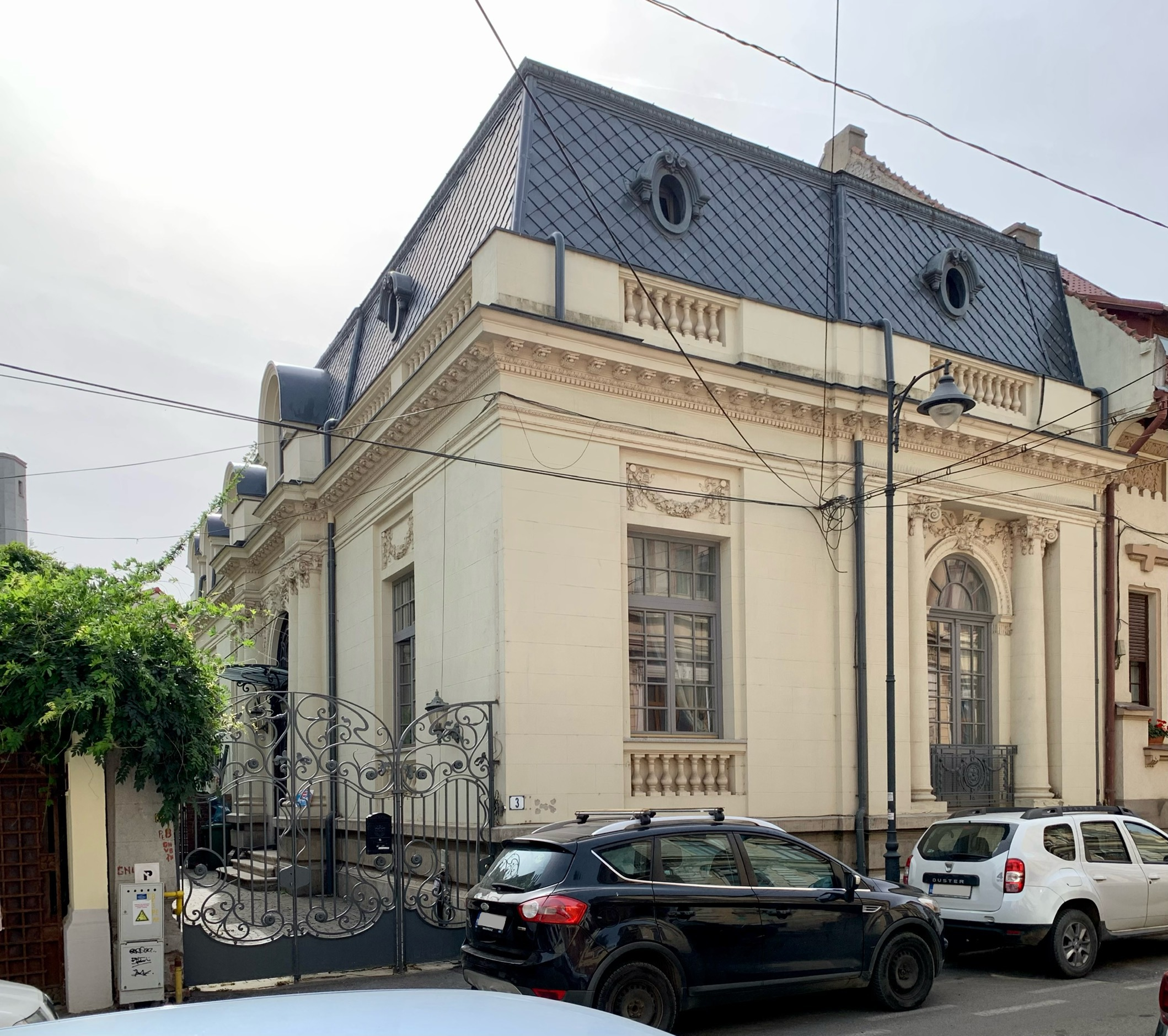
Beaux-Arts aka Eclectic - Dimitrie Manole House, Bucharest, by Edmond van Saanen Algi, 1915

Besides administrative buildings and the residences of wealthy people, many city-houses with a street facade and a garden were also built, belonging to middle and upper middle class individuals, like doctors, engineers, architects or workers. Most of these houses have two or three window on the street facade, and the door and other windows on the garden facade. The room with the windows towards the street was in most cases the living room, so the people who happened to walk on that street could see how good the owners lived. The terrains of these proprieties were divided usually more or less equally into the garden and house surfaces. Above the entrance, some of them have monograms and/or cartouches with the year when they were erected. Most of the houses have their door in the garden, not towards the street, because during the Belle Époque there was a law that made owners who had doors at the street pay higher taxes.

Most if not all rich people of the Belle Époque and the interwar period had servants who lived with them on their property. They lived in a different part of the house, or had a separate structure in the garden, similar to the house but smaller. These separate structures were in most cases in the back of the garden, usually having common walls with the house of the neighbours. In the case of old houses from the 1st half of the 19th century or even from the Phanariote period (1711/1716-1821), which had huge gardens, the owners built a new bigger one for them in the Belle Époque, and gave the old one to the servants, as it is the case of Strada Negustori no. 4 in Bucharest.

=== Details and ornaments ===
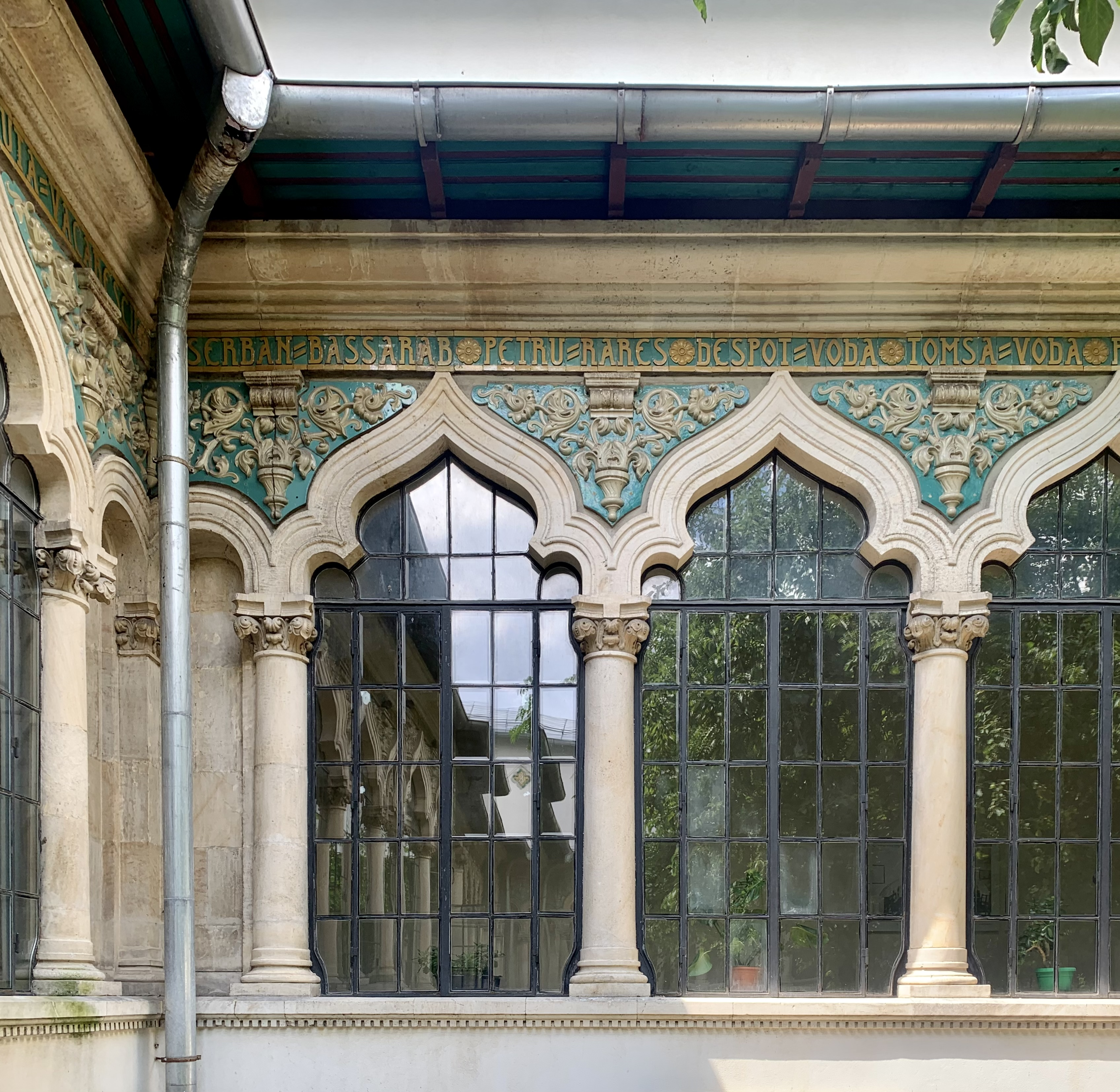
Polychrome ceramic tiles with foliage spirals (aka rinceaux) in the courtyard of the Central Girls' School, Bucharest, by Ion Mincu, 1890

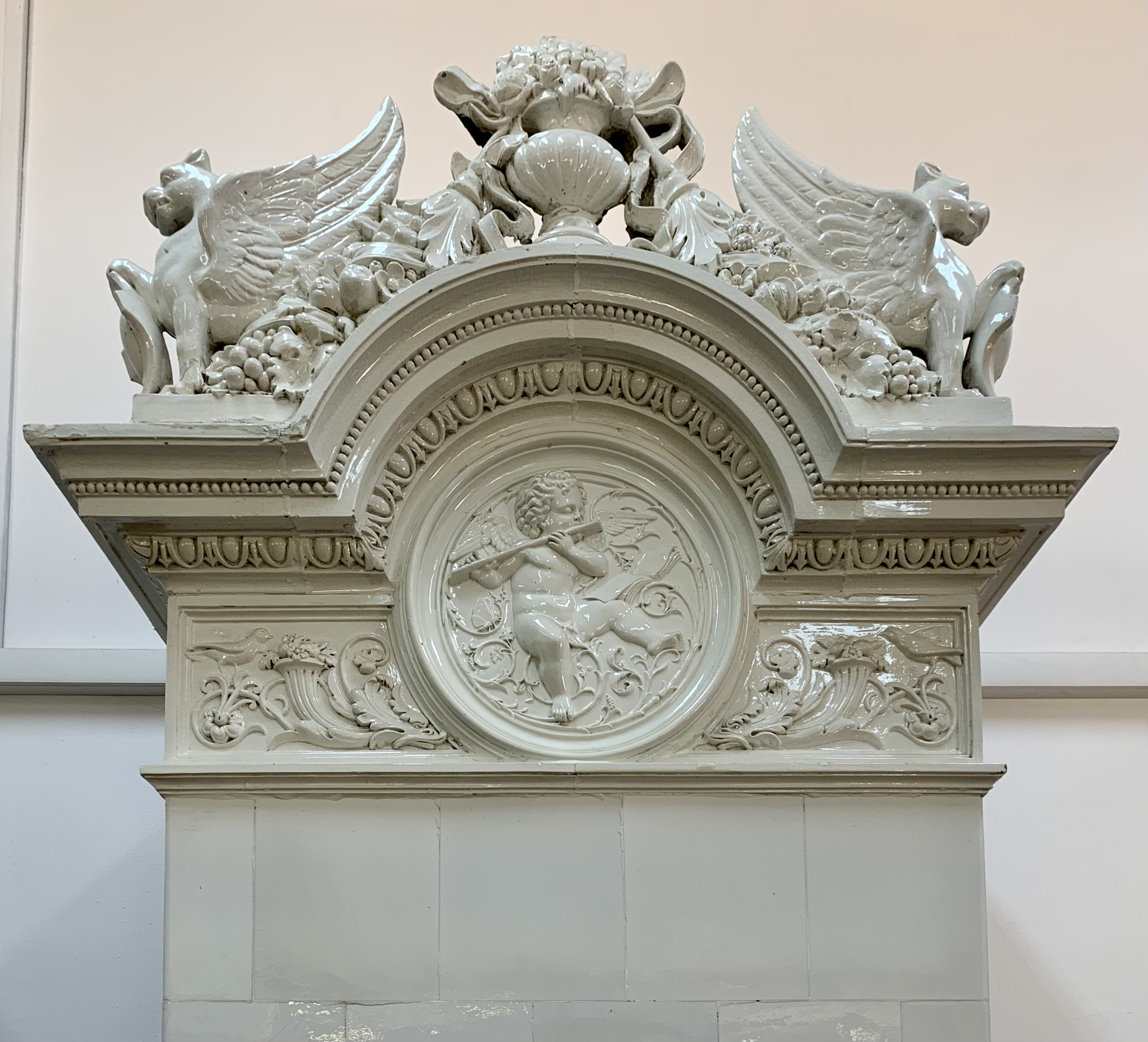
Upper part of a Neoclassical tiled stove, decorated with griffins, garlands (aka festoons), a medallion with a cerub (aka putto), cornucopias and foliage spirals, in the principals' house of the Central Girls' School, Bucharest, unknown designer, 1890

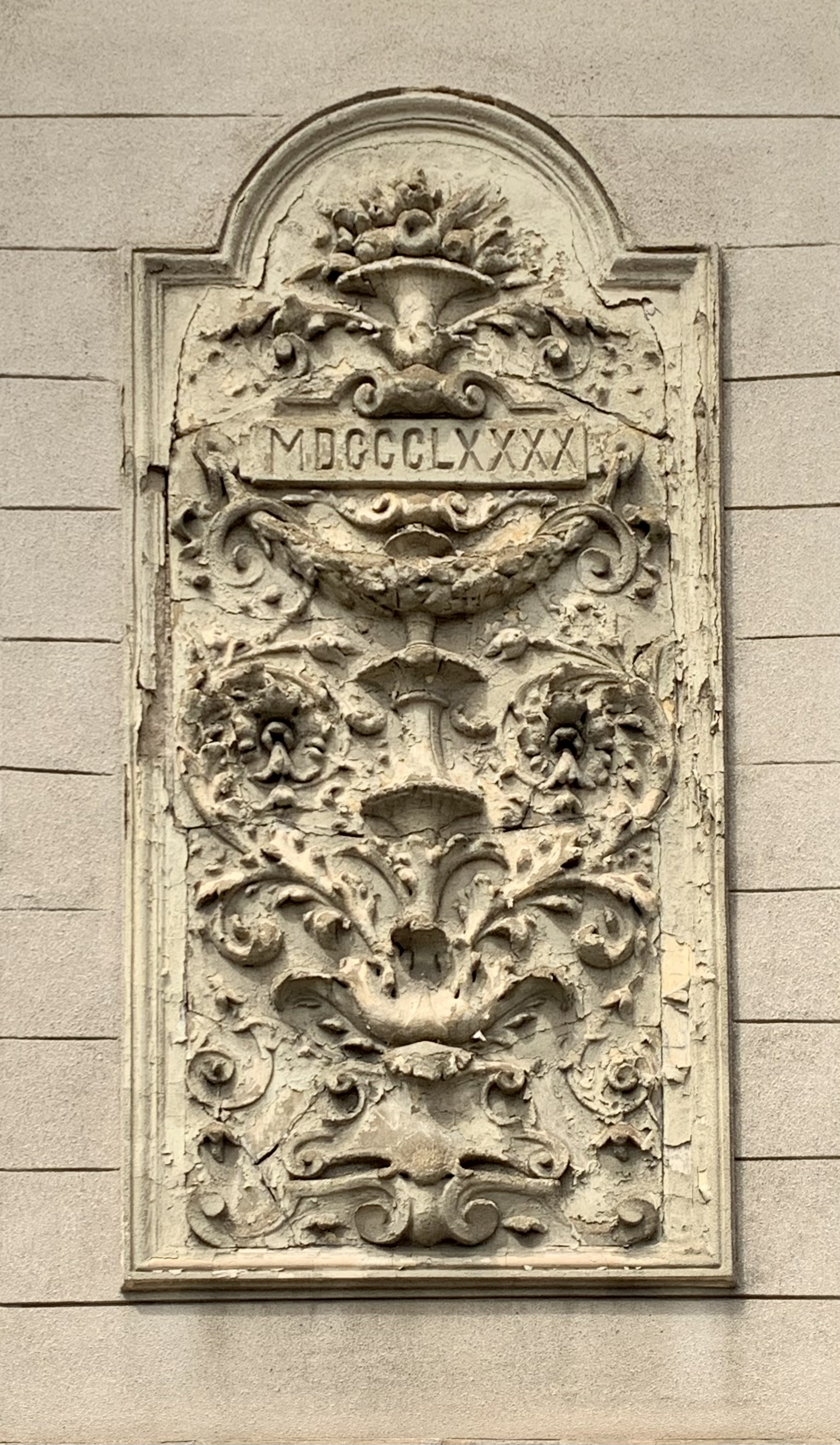
Arabesque with foliage spirals and a rectangular cartouche with the year when the house was built, on a corner of Strada General H.M. Berthelot no. 52, Bucharest, unknown architect, 1890

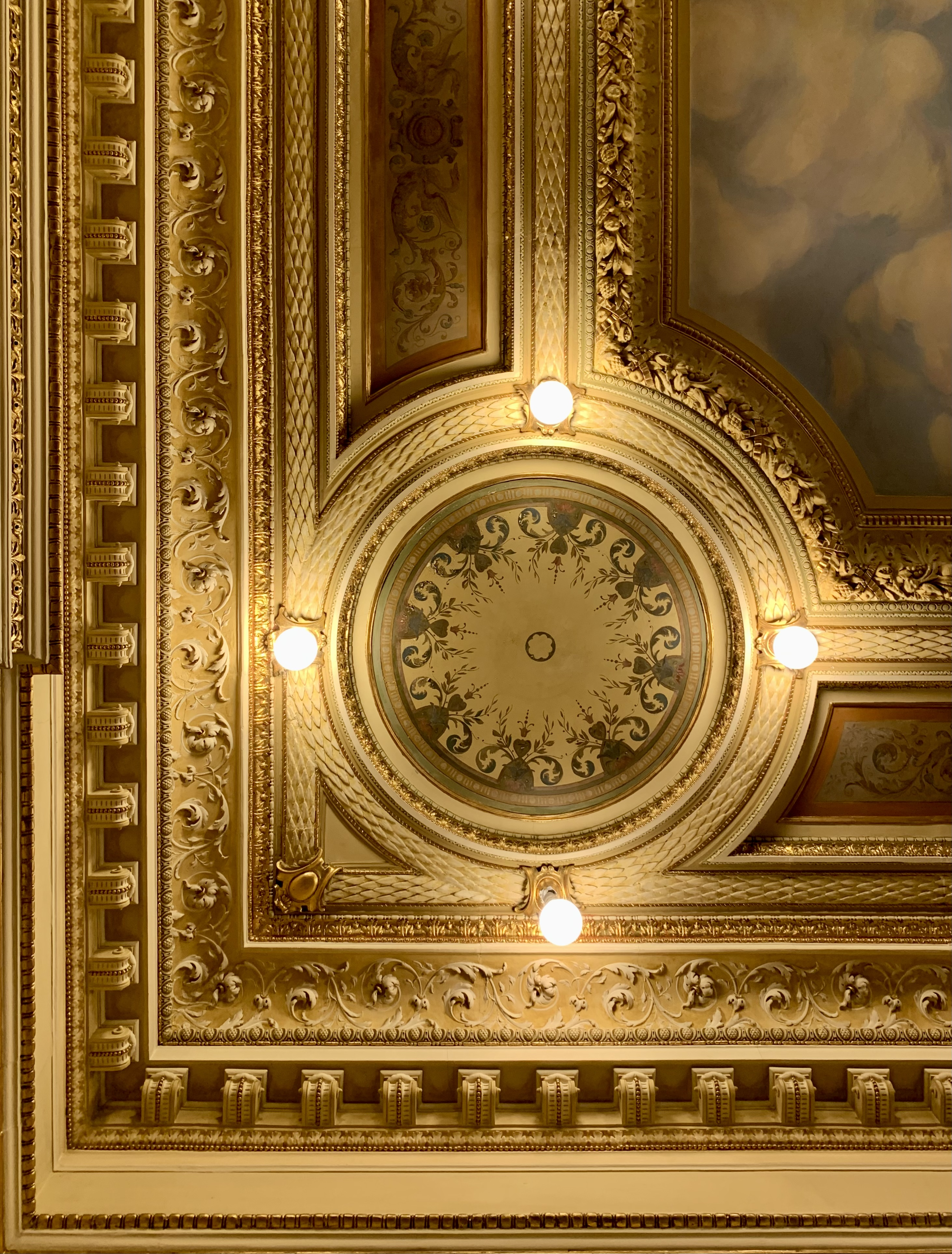
Detailed ceiling with stuccos and decorative paintings in the Cesianu-Racoviță Palace, Bucharest, by John Elisée Berthet, 1892-1902

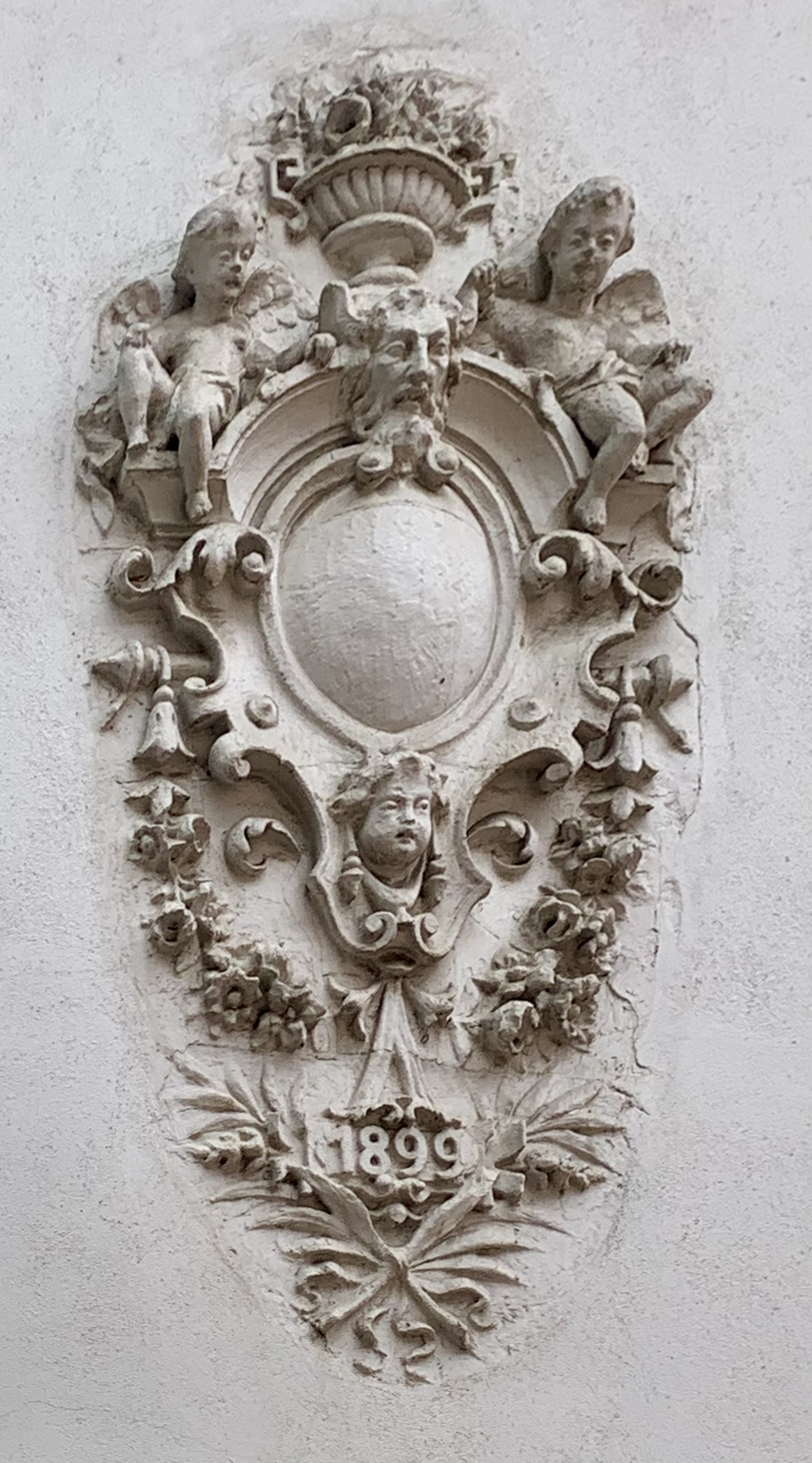
Arabesque with a big and blank cartouche and cherubs, on a wall of Intrarea Costache Negri no. 1, Bucharest, unknown architect, 1899

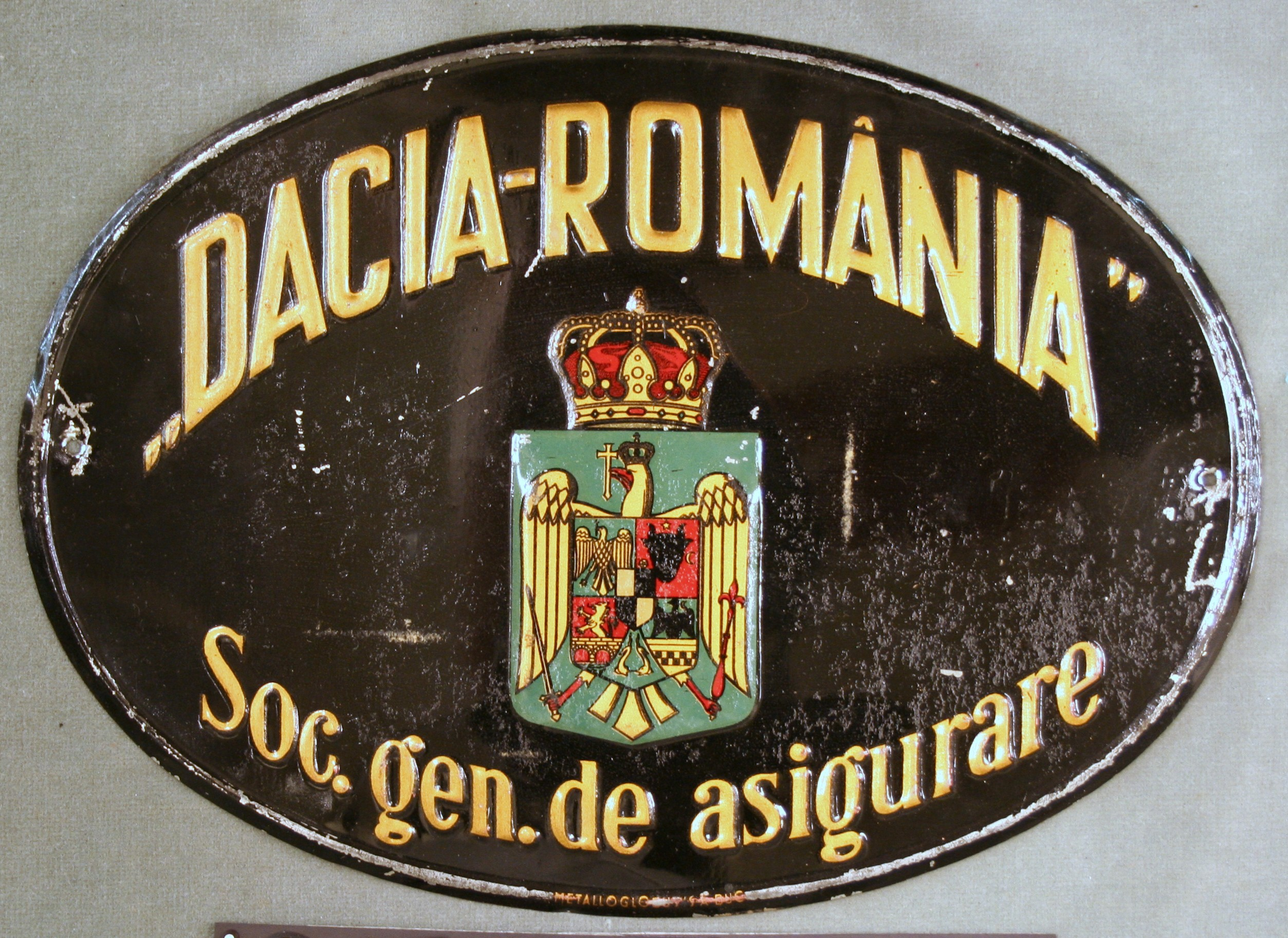
Pressed tin fire mark of the Dacia-România Insurance Company, c.1900. Marks like this were put on the facades of houses, showing the insurance company to which the owner was subscribed. The same applies to other insurance companies, like Generala, Agricola or Asigurarea Românească. Some of them are still in the same place today, but rusty

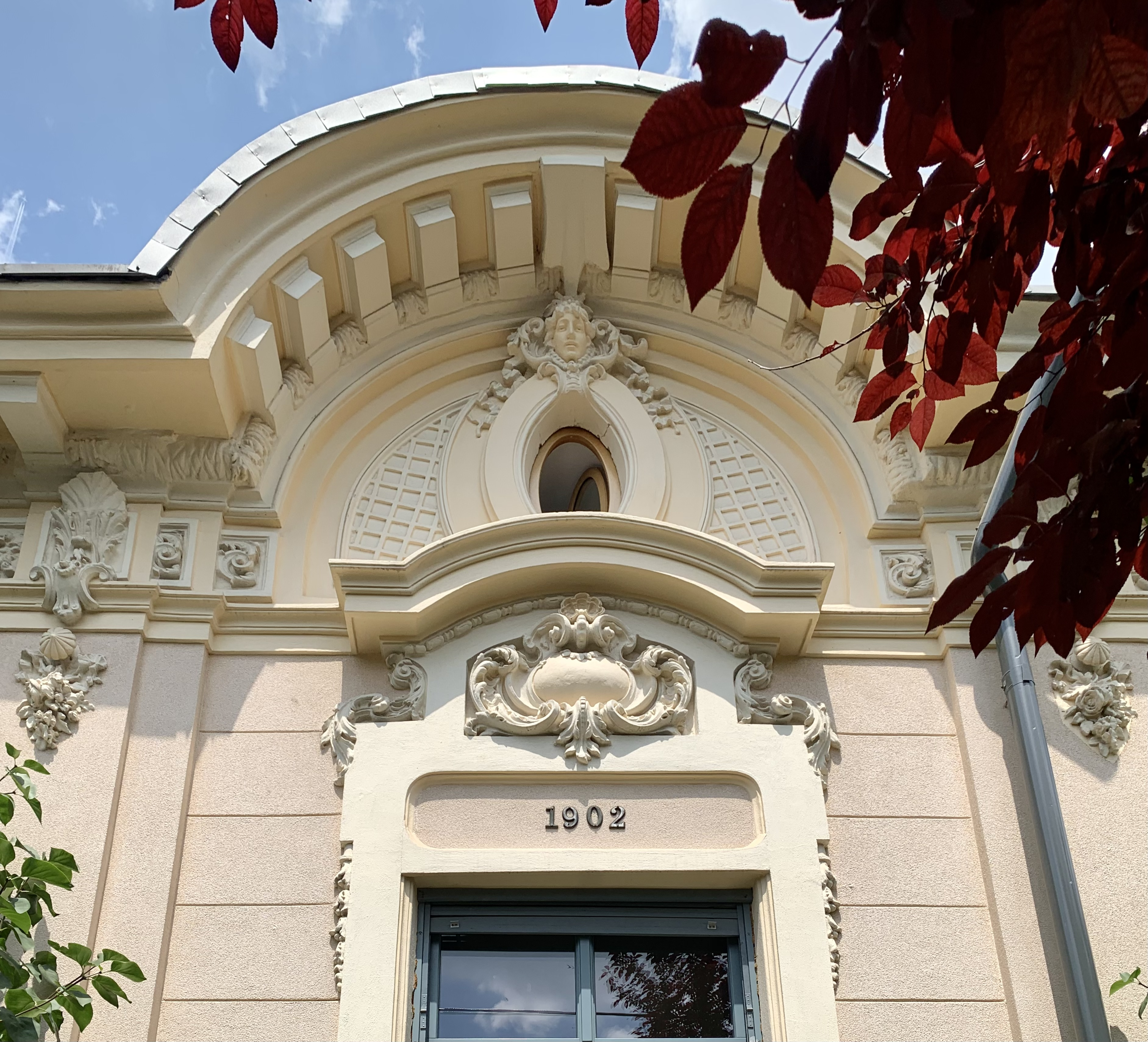
Cartouches and other ornaments of the Maria D. Nicolau House, Bucharest, unknown architect, 1902

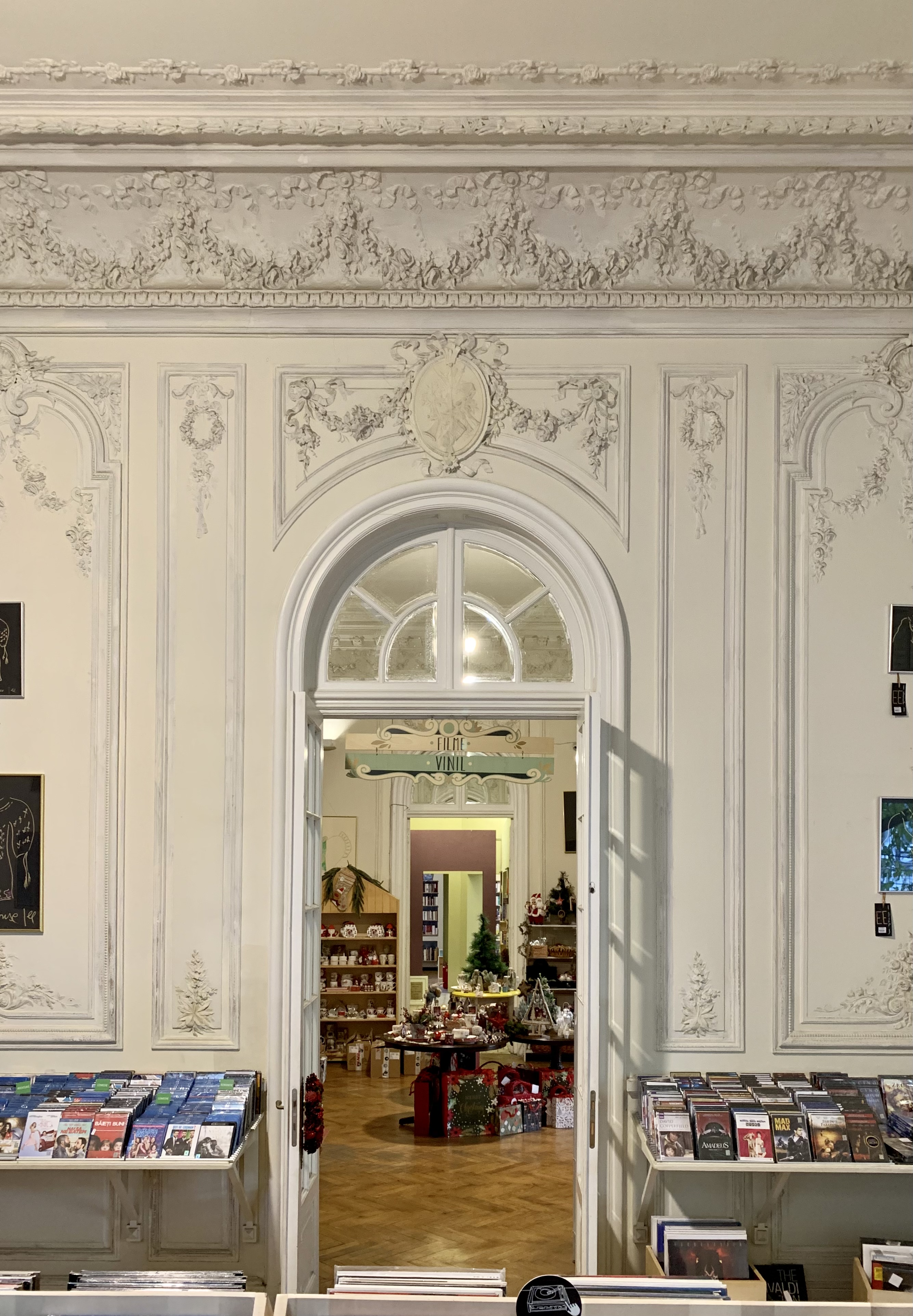
Wall and ceiling decorated with stuccos, the style being a mix of Rococo and the Louis XVI style, in Strada Arthur Verona no. 15, Bucharest, unknown architect, c.1910

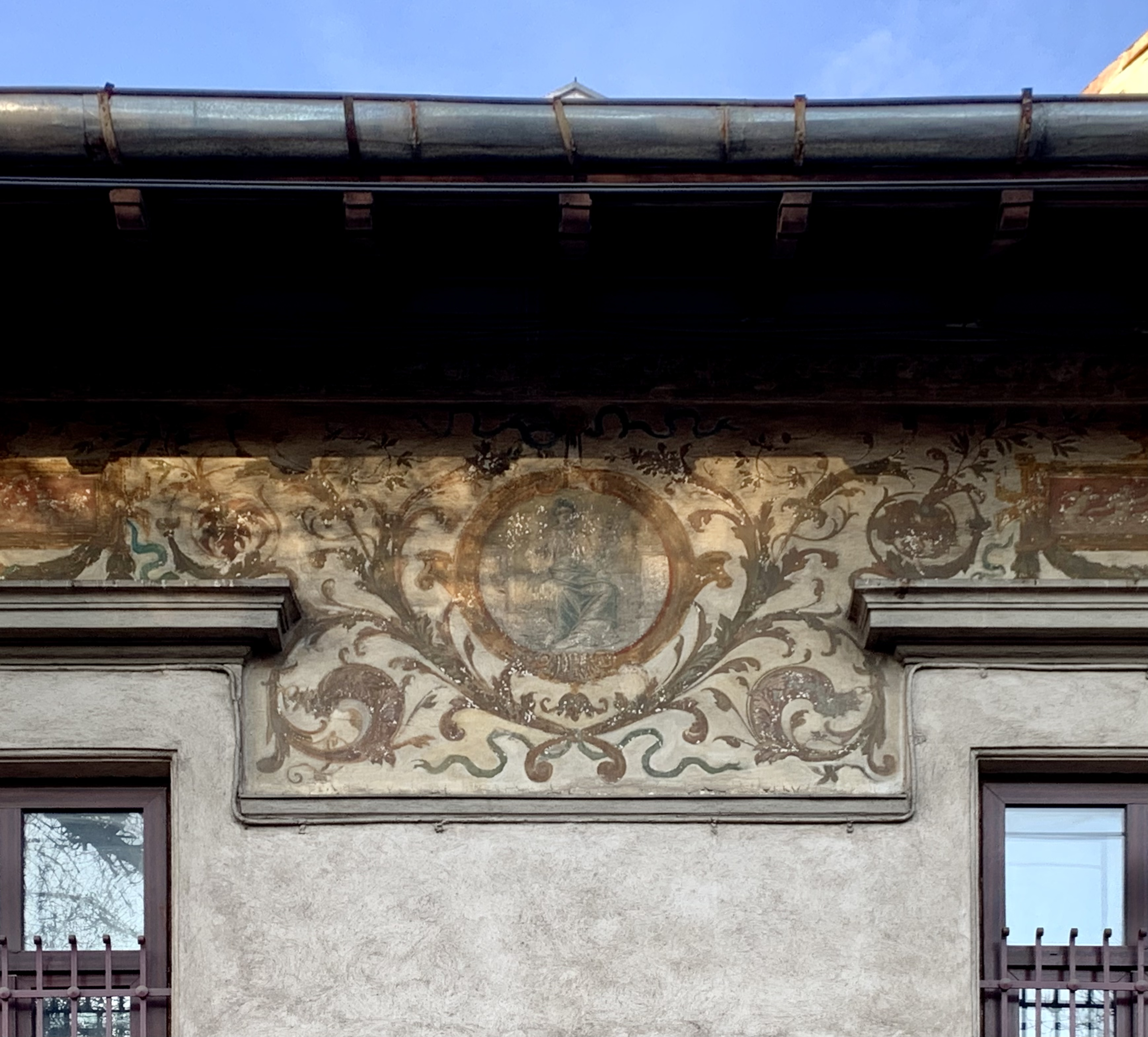
Fresco with cartouches and foliage spirals on the upper part of the facade of Strada Occidentului no. 11, Bucharest, painter: C. Cora, architect: Cesare Fantoli, 1910

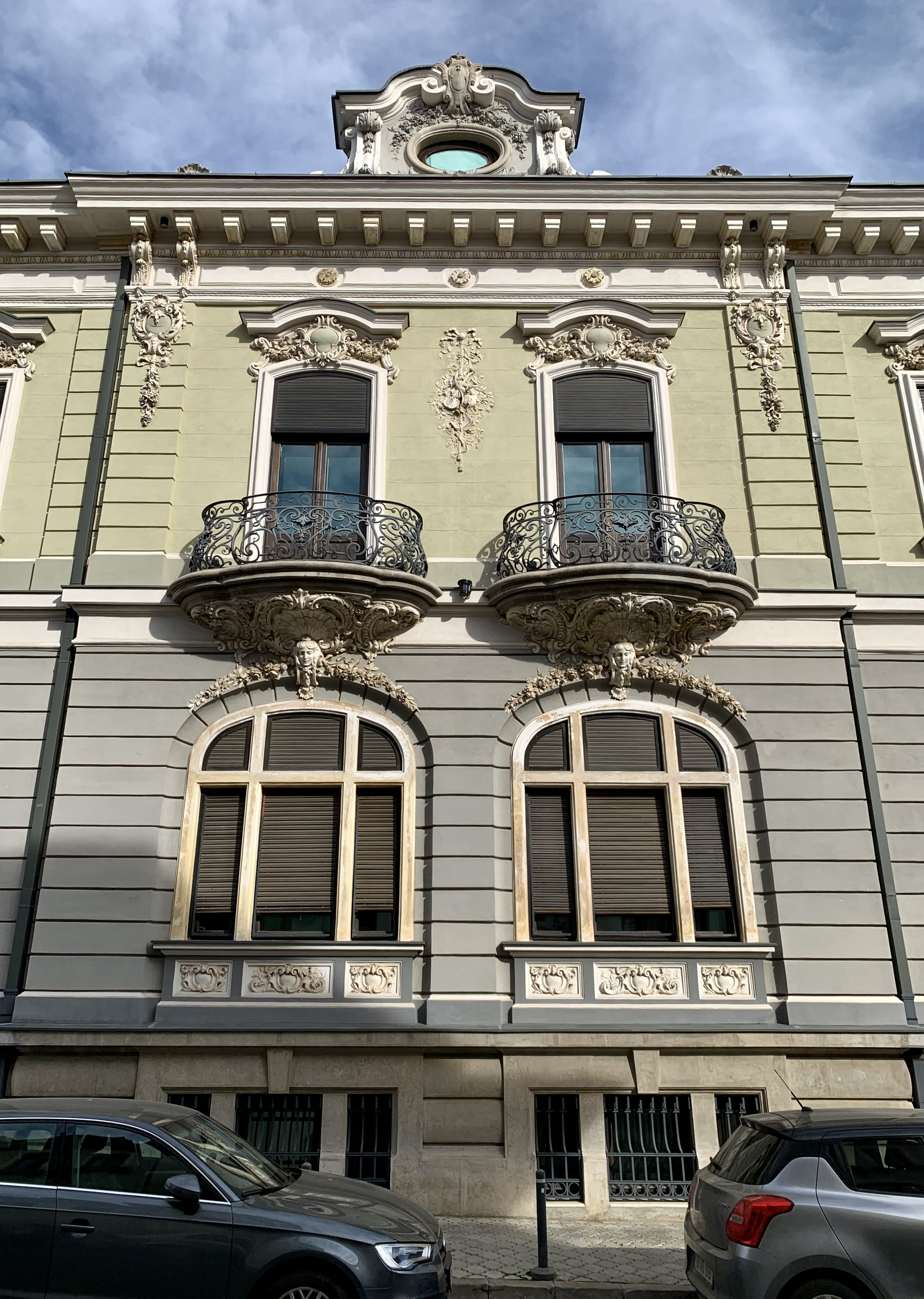
Complex wrought iron papo-de-rola balconies with elaborate Rococo Revival shells and round shapes (aka volutes) under them, on the facade of Strada General H. M. Berthelot no. 41, Bucharest, unknown architect, 1911

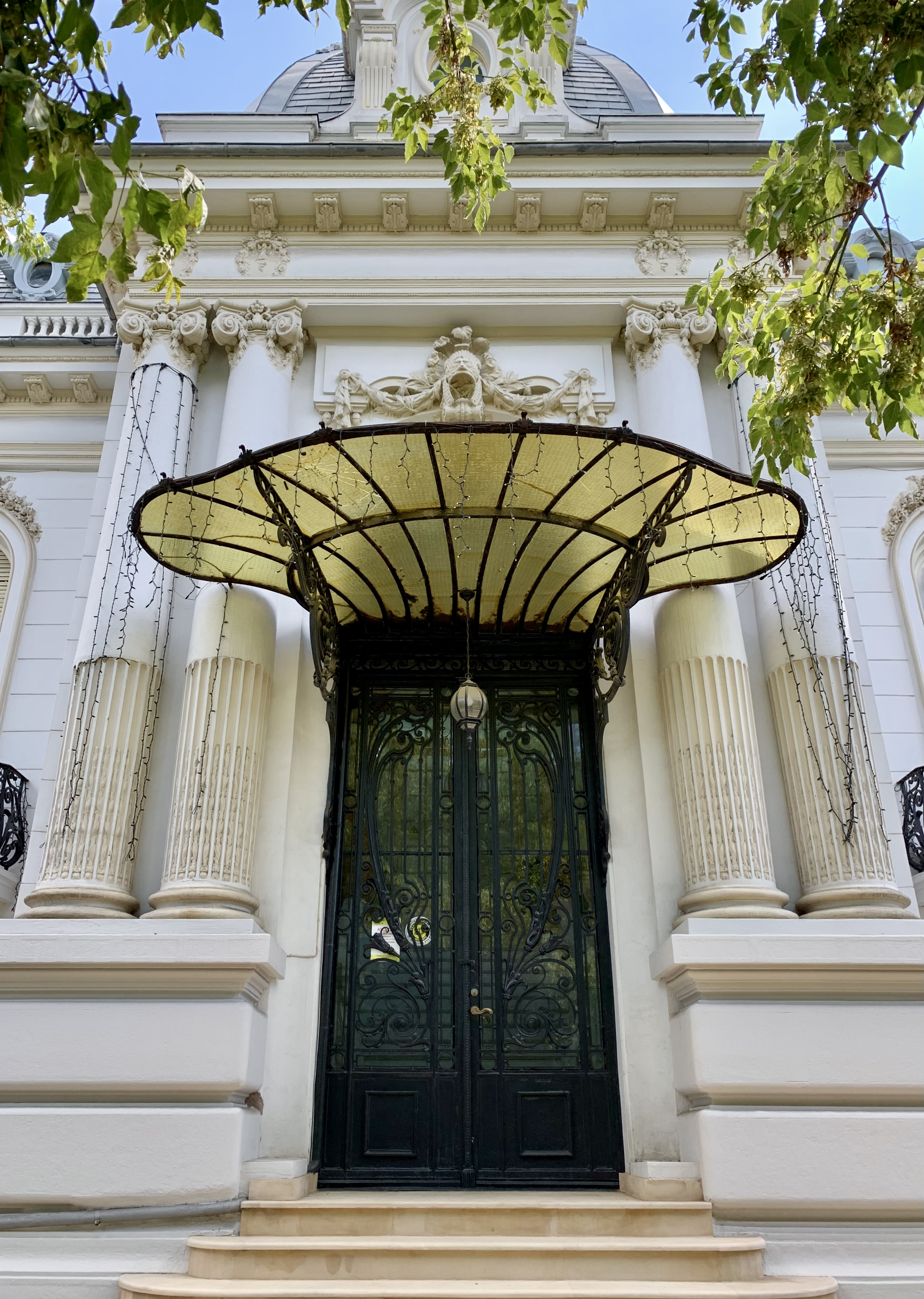
Wrought iron door with a glass and metal awning at the top, at the entrance of the George Deșliu House on Bulevardul Dacia, Bucharest, by Ernest Doneaud, 1912

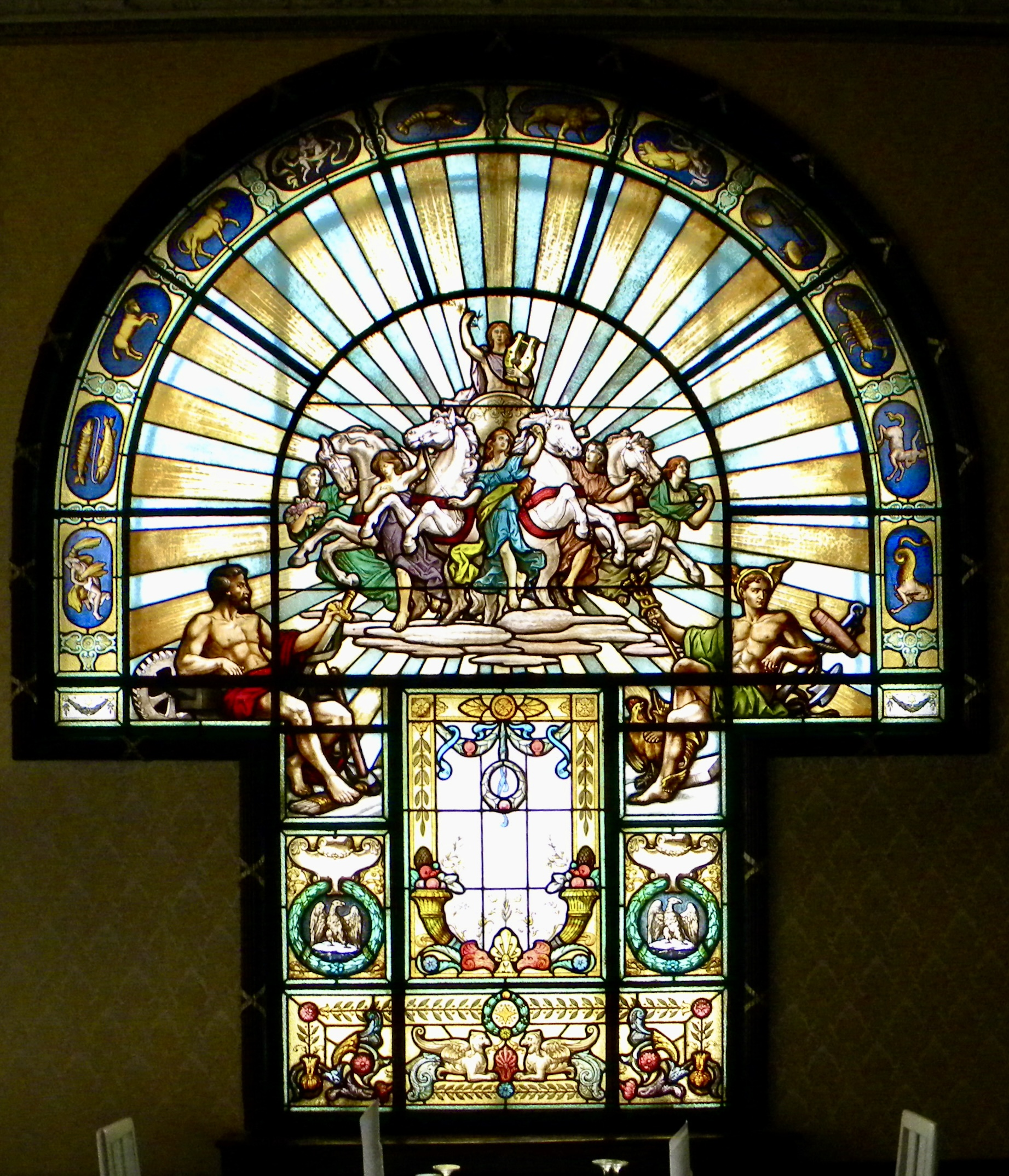
Spectacular stained glass window with an Ancient Greek mythological theme in the Assan House, Bucharest, by Ion D. Berindey, 1914

Belle Époque architecture is characterized by complex details on the facades, and also more or less in the interiors, especially when it comes to the houses of wealthy individuals. Besides its practical purpose, a facade also had to be beautiful, since they were at that time a social status indicator. Thus, it could be said that streets with buildings from the Belle Époque are a sort of art galleries. Almost all of the ornaments that decorate these facades are made of plaster, produced with moulds, instead of being carved in stone. Craftsmen and sculptors who worked with plaster started to come in big numbers in Romania at the end of the 18th century. According to the documents that we have, the first house in Bucharest that was adorned with plaster decorations was the one of Dinicu Golescu, built in 1820. Exterior painted ornaments are quite rare, since they tend to degrade quicker than the sculpted ones. A material used for Romanian Revival facades were ceramic tiles, usually in bright colours.

Most houses have oval frame-like ornaments, called cartouches, in which sometimes it is written the year when a building was erected, or the initials of its owner. This is especially helpful because these inscriptions show clearly when something was built, a date otherwise unknown. They are usually located on the upper part of the facade, above the entrance door or in the pediment above the entrance. Especially in the interwar period, little plaques with the names of the architect and/or engineer started to be popular on the facades of villas, apartment and administrative buildings. All of these texts are almost always written with fonts that fit with the style of the building.

Besides simple linear moldings and Greco-Roman ornaments, most of the motifs used for decorating Neoclassical and Beaux Arts architecture consist of foliage, flowers, garlands (aka festoons) and vegetal spirals (aka rinceaux). Human figures were not rare, usually appearing under the form of mascarons (literally face-shaped ornaments) at the top of windows, doors or in cartouches. There were also medallions showing people from profile, but these were quite rare. Another form of human representation were putti (aka cherubs), which were basically cubby winged baby angels.

Generally, a Belle Époque house has a monumental entrance in their garden, done for impressing the guests the owners might have. In the case of houses from the 1880s and 1890s, the door is usually placed between two columns and has a pediment above, like a miniature of an Ancient Greek or Roman temple entrance. Despite being a detail, the handles of doors can have intricate details and shapes. Interior doors were simpler, and sometimes featured painted arabesques, like in the case of Strada Italiană no. 21 in Bucharest. Interior doors often had clusters of ornaments at the top, or a big cartouche with a painting inside. Entrances tend to have shell-shaped glass and metal awnings (Romanian: marchize) on the exterior, for protecting the door from weather, but also to make the entrance more monumental. Some entrances also had small green house-like rooms, with glass walls. Some bourgeois houses have porte-cochères, relatively rare, mostly in Bucharest.

Interiors are decorated with stuccos. They usually have decorated cornices at the edge where the walls intersect with the ceiling, and cartouches or medallions in the corners. Houses of rich people usually had painted ceilings. The room with the most opulent decoration was always the living room and/or the guest room. This was obviously for impressing the guests, similarly with how we put today pictures with our wins on social media to impress others. Walls were simpler than the ceiling, divided into geometric panels in the Louis XVI style, adorned with pilasters, or completely blank. Most interiors also had tiled stoved for warming the house. Most of them were completely white, like the ones from the Dimitrie Sturdza House in Bucharest. Fireplaces were relatively rare, most of them in the residences of wealthy individuals, palaces or state institutions.

=== Demolitions ===
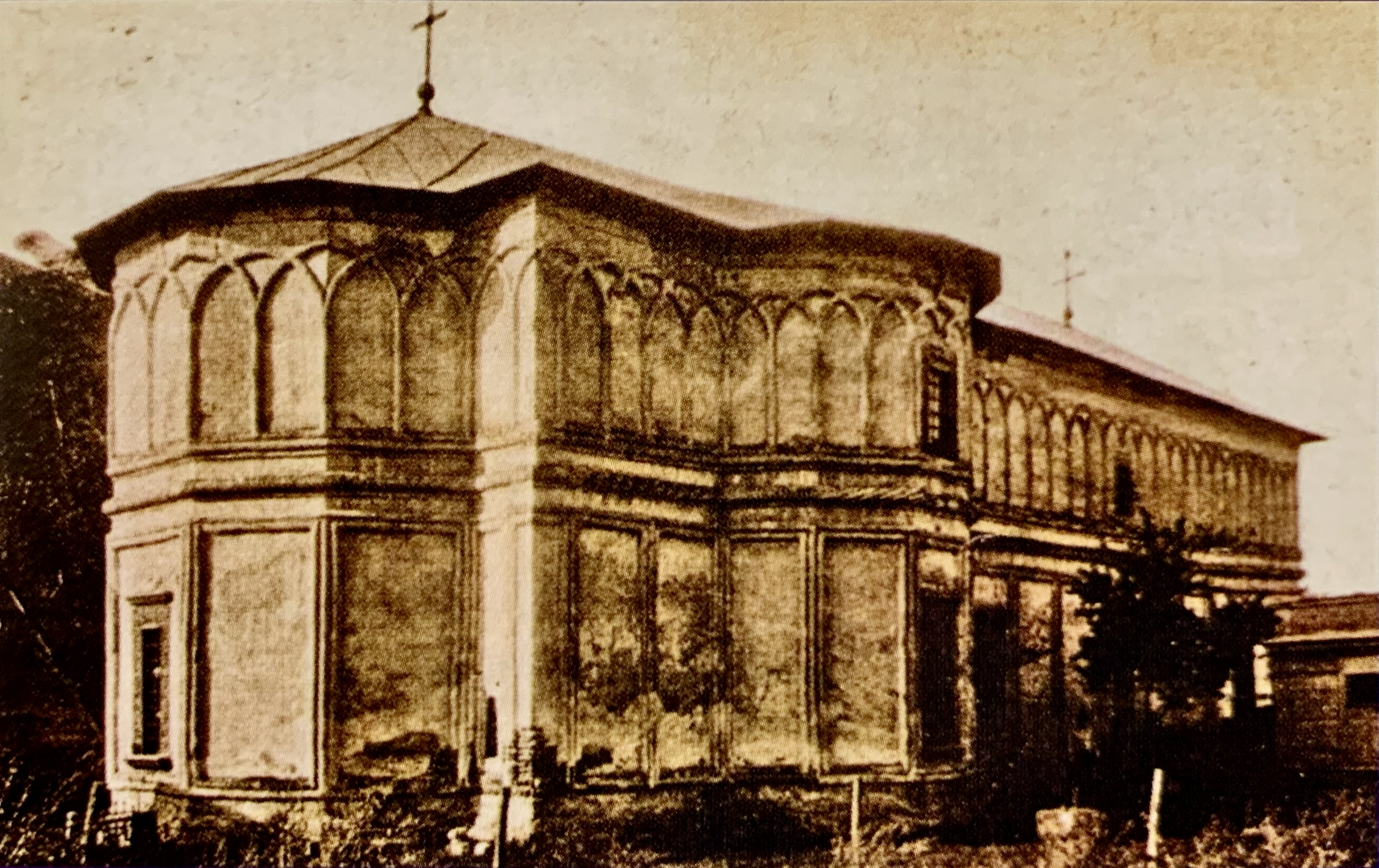
Saint John the Great Monastery, where is now the CEC Palace, Bucharest, built initially before 1591, highly modified in 1703 during the reign of Constantin Brâncoveanu, demolished in 1875. Ornaments from the construction of 1703 are preserved in the lapidary of the Stavropoleos Monastery

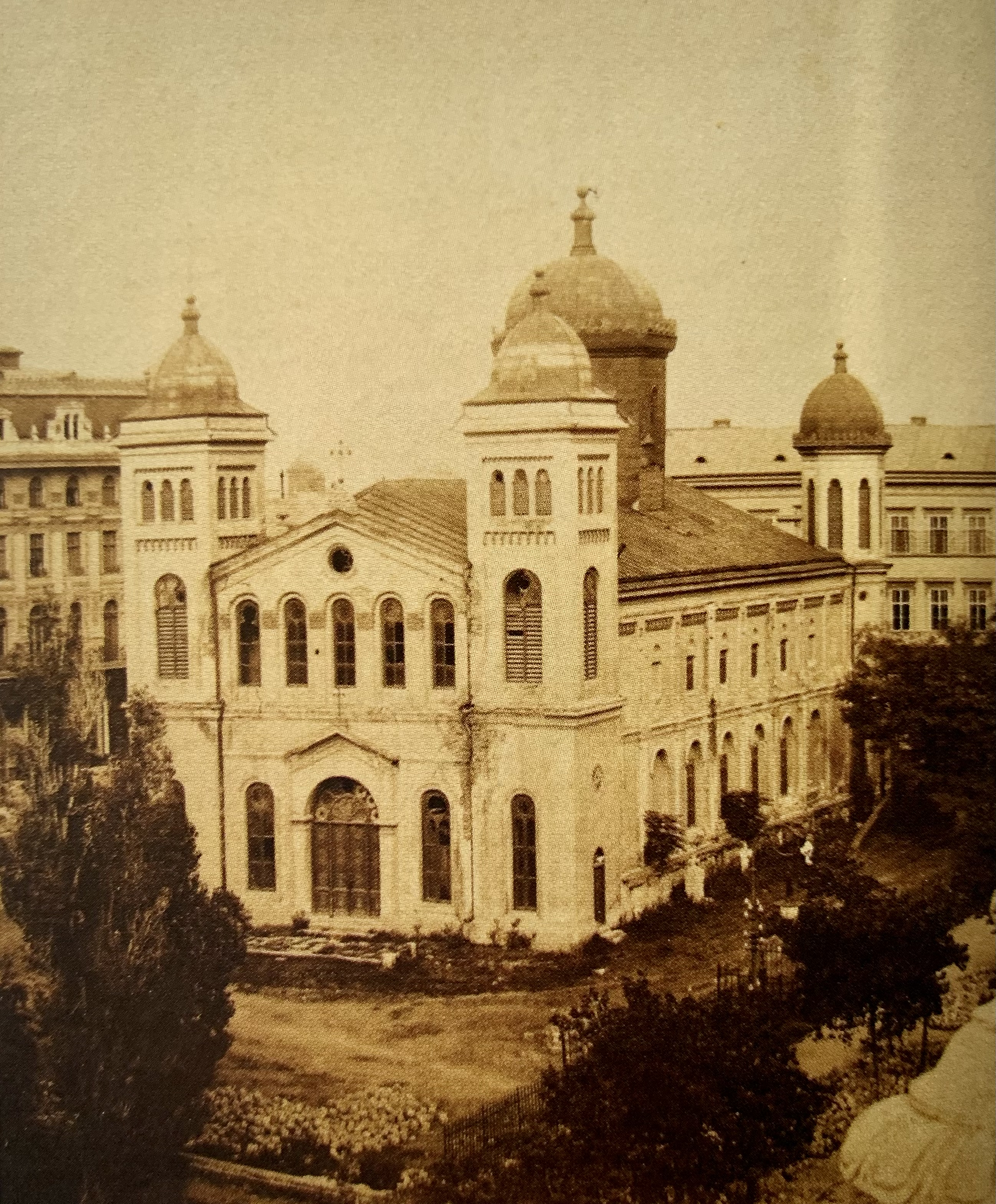
Sărindar Monastery Church, where is now the National Military Club, Bucharest, built in the mid-17th century by Matei Basarab, modified in the mid 19th century in a Gothic Revival style, demolished in 1896

During the reign of Carol I, due to the need for new headquarters for state institutions, some heritage buildings were demolished. This was mainly because back then, the idea of historic monument didn't exist. Thus, landmarks that were a few centuries old were turned down too make space for new buildings. In downtown Bucharest, multiple monasteries, churches and inns from the late Romanian Middle Ages or the Early Modern Period were demolished.

=== Art Nouveau ===
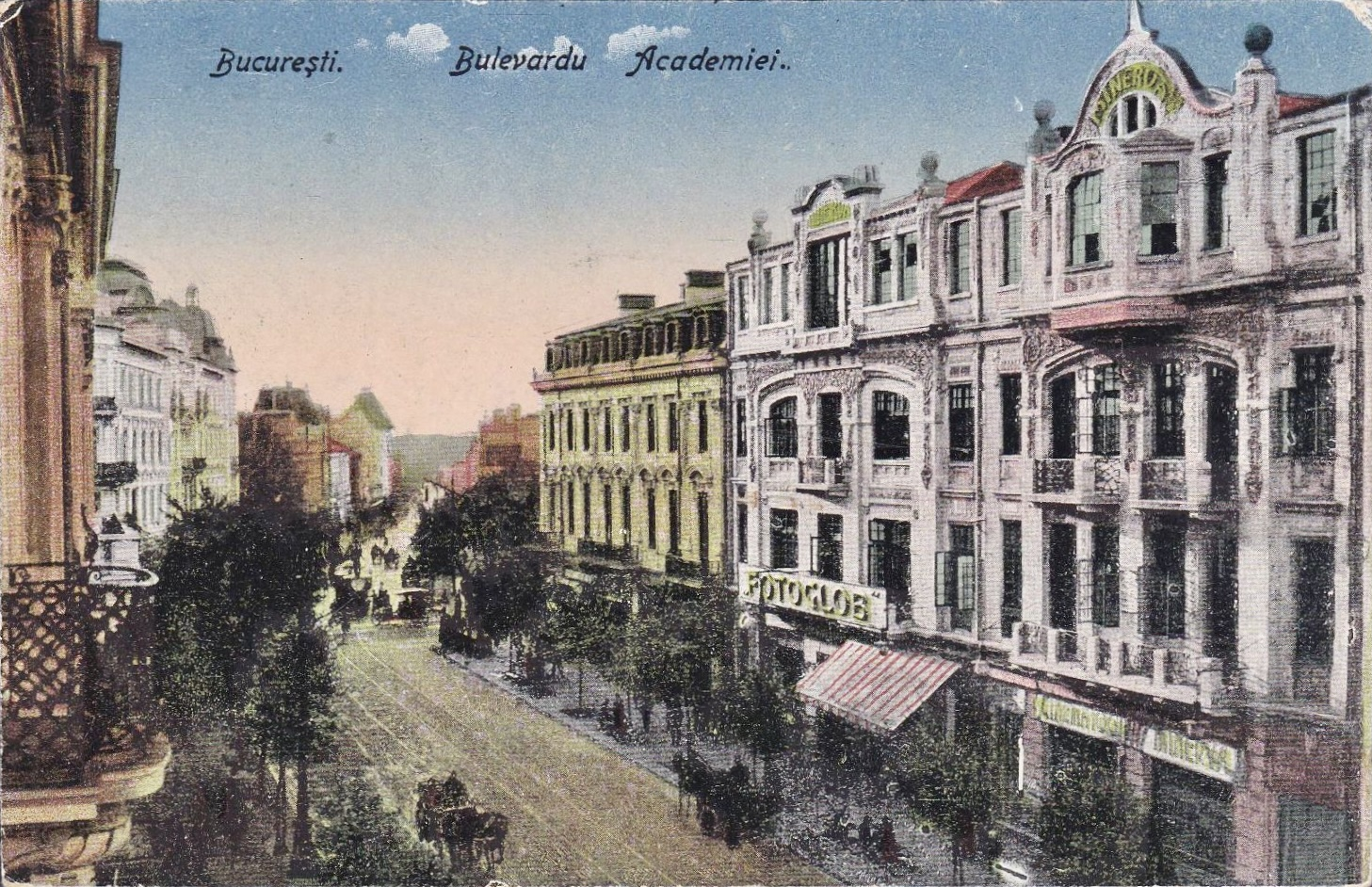
Minerva publisher headquarter on Bulevardul Regina Elisabeta, Bucharest, unknown architect, c.1900-destroyed by WW2 bombardments

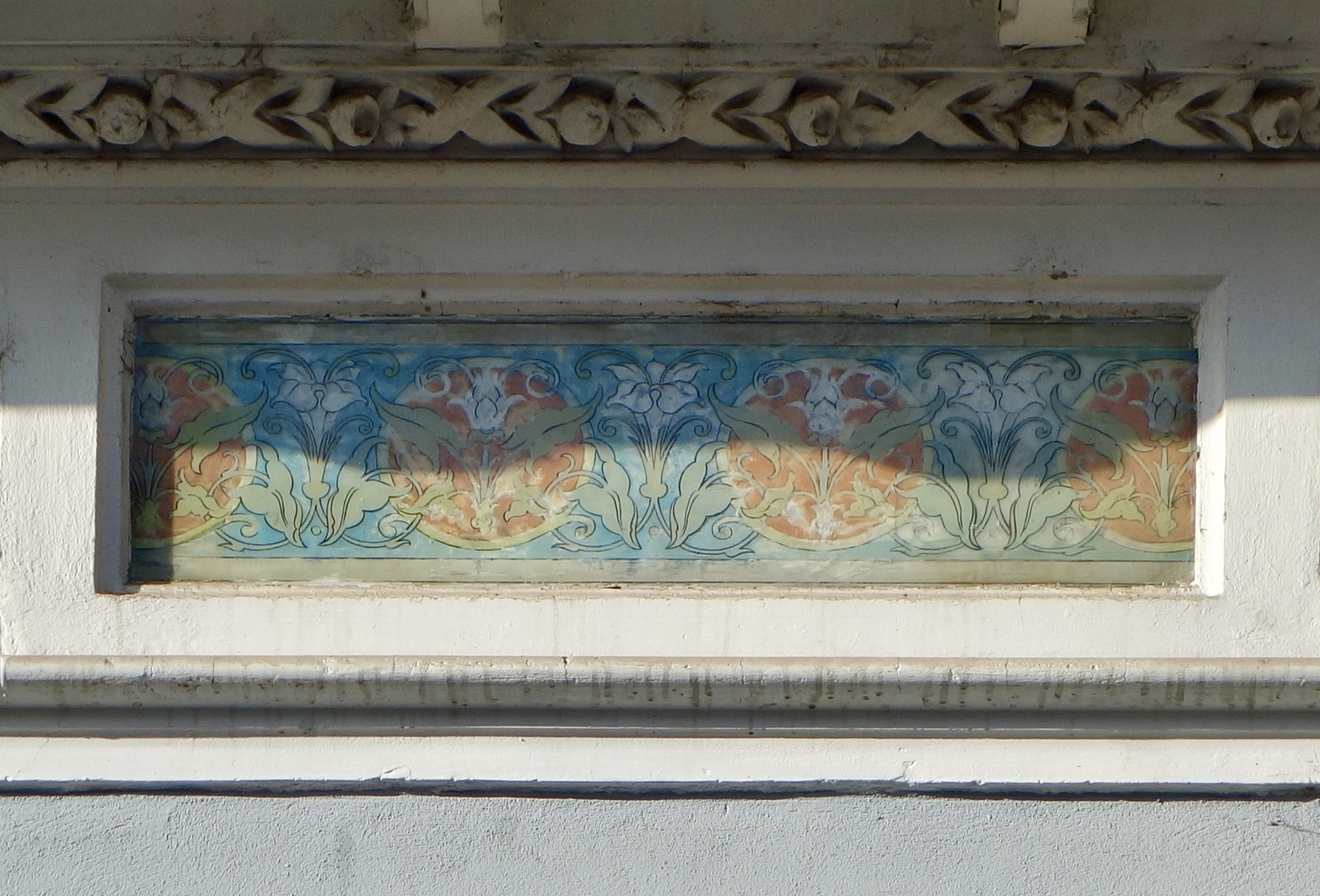
Frieze of Strada Constantin F. Robescu no. 1, Bucharest, unknown architect, c. 1900

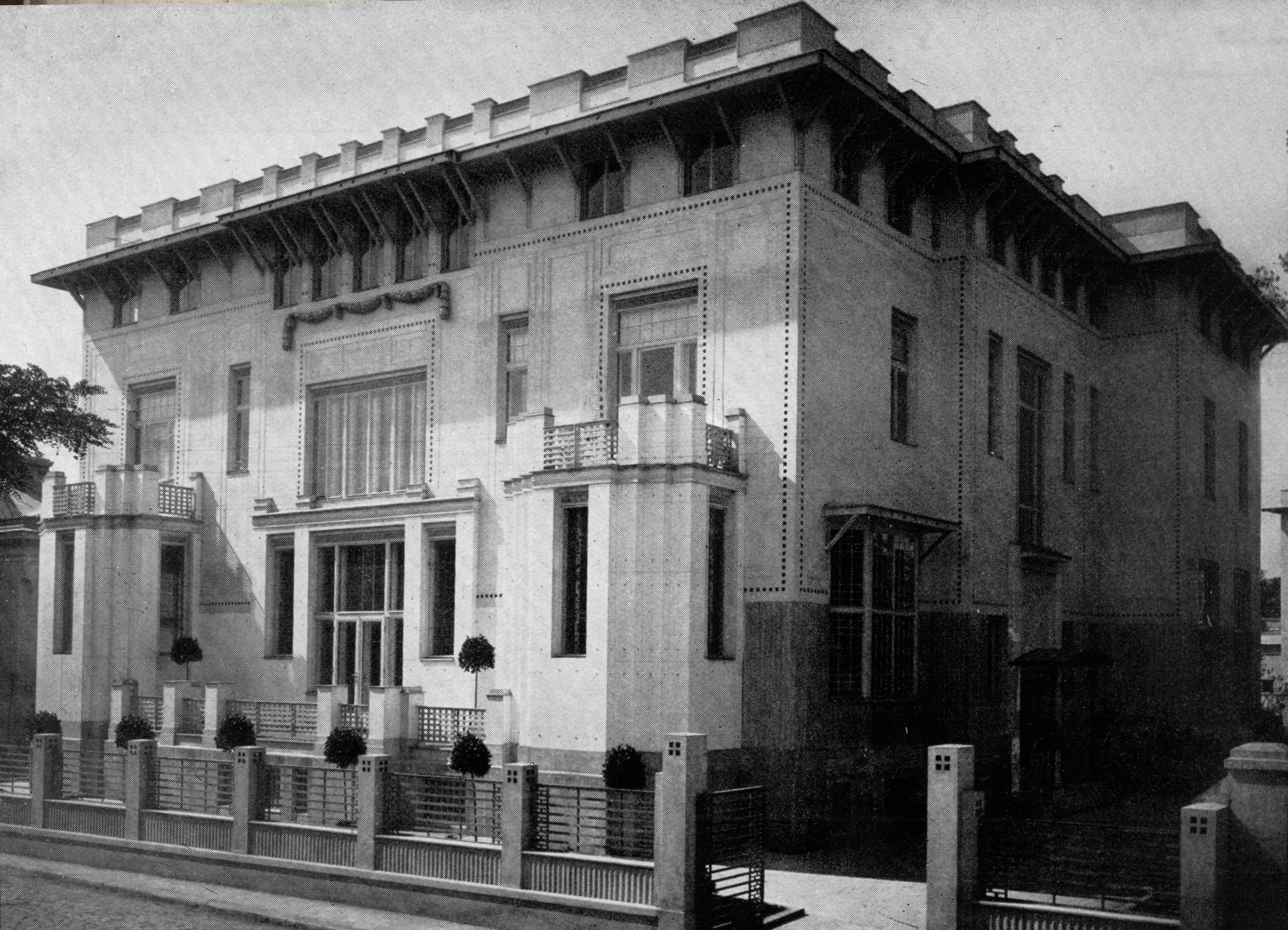
Vienna Secession - Bazil Assan House (Strada Scaune no. 21-23, currently Strada Tudor Arghezi), Bucharest, by Marcel Kammerer, 1902-1911, demolished in the late 1950s or the 1960s to make space for the National Theatre Bucharest

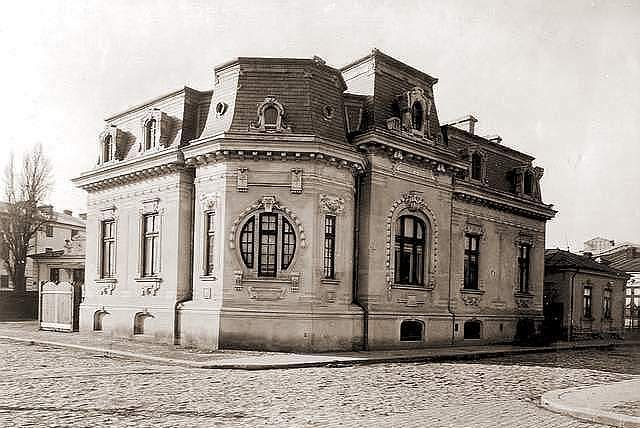
Mix of Beaux Arts and Art Nouveau - Romulus Porescu House (Strada Doctor Paleologu no. 12), Bucharest, by Dimitrie Maimarolu, 1905

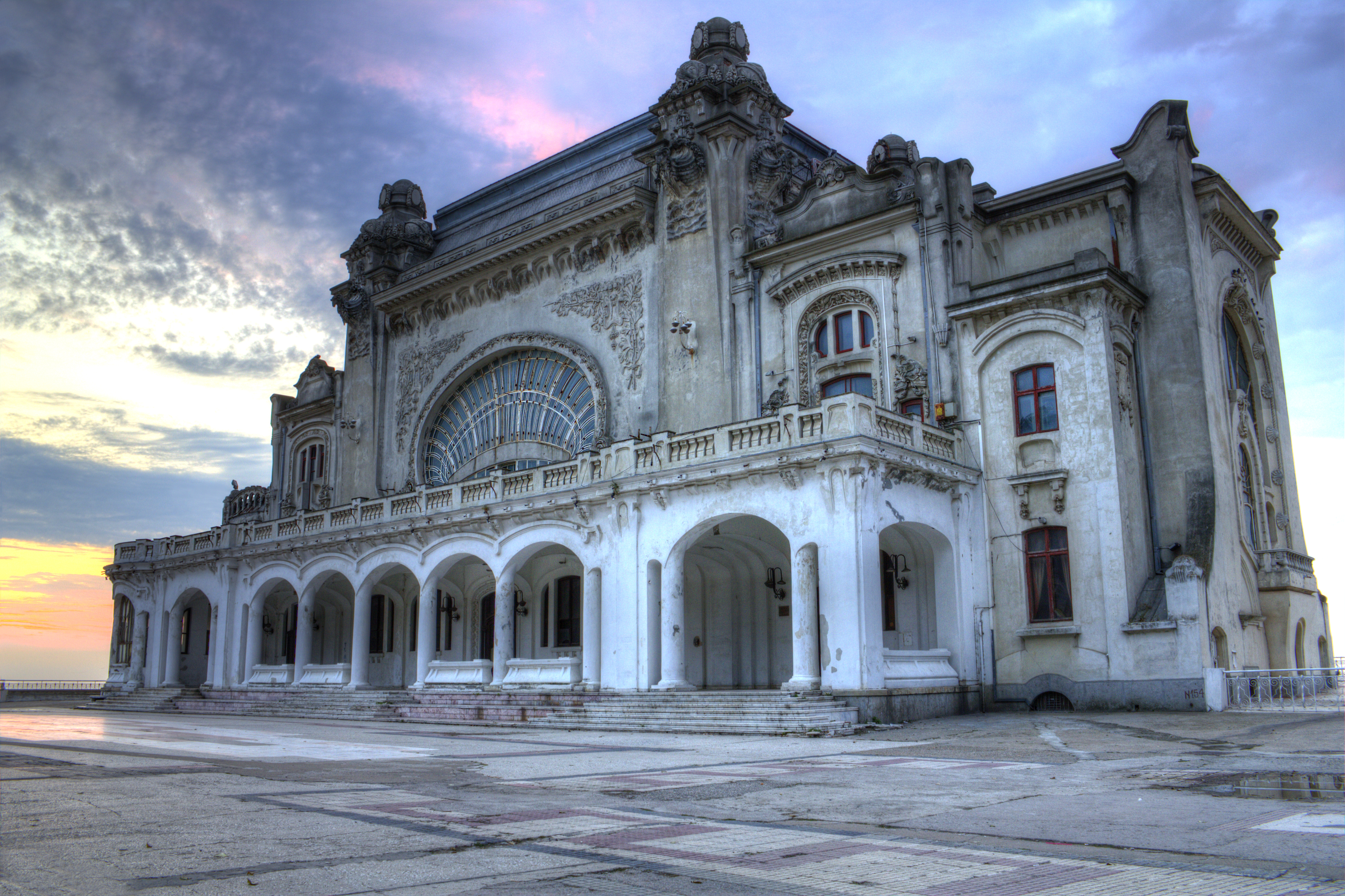
Mix of Beaux Arts and Art Nouveau - Constanța Casino, Constanța, by Daniel Renard and Petre Antonescu, 1905-1910

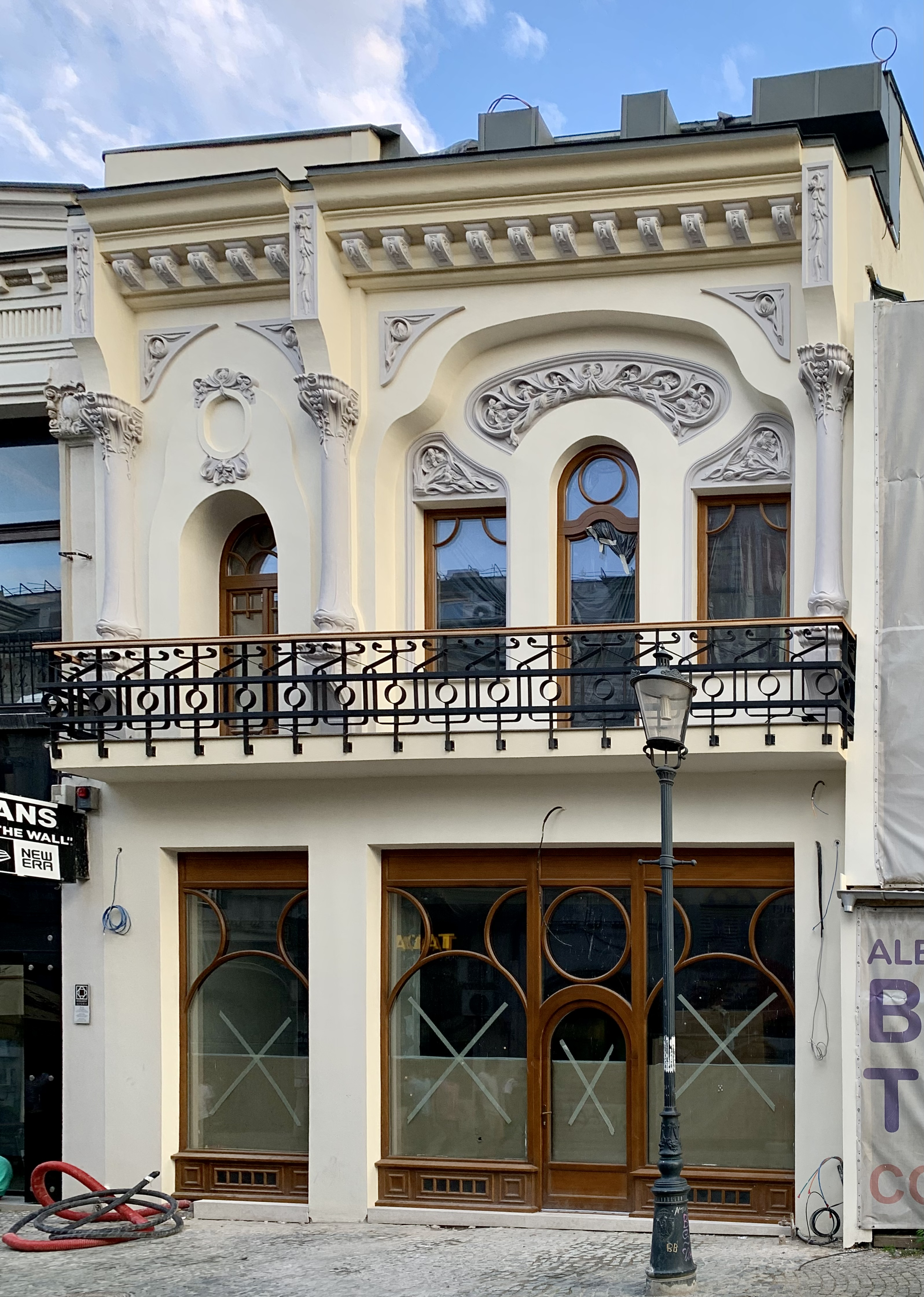
Former Al. Assan shop (Strada Lipscani no. 72-74), Bucharest, unknown architect, before 1906

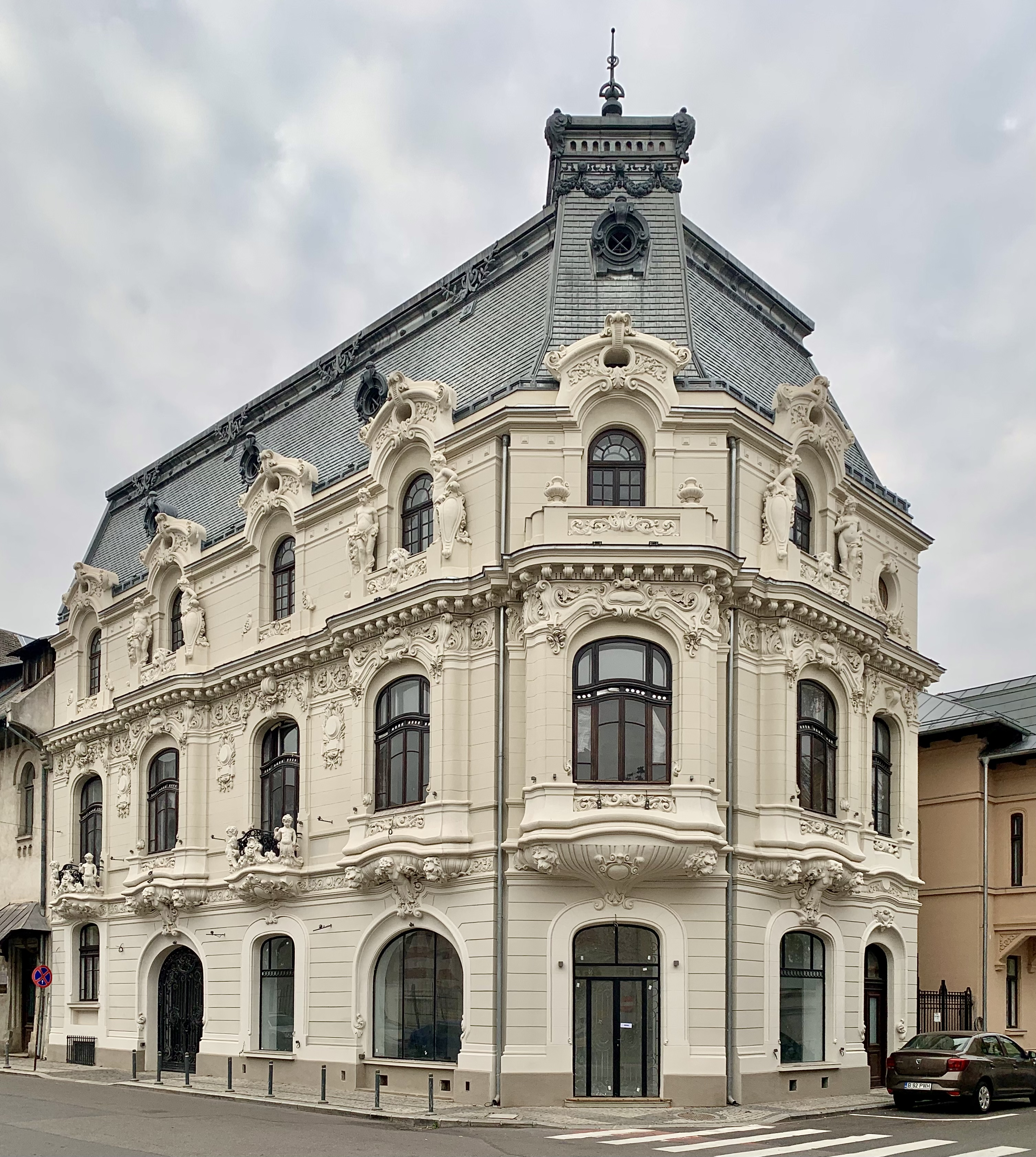
Mix of Beaux Arts and Art Nouveau - Mița the Cyclist House (Strada Biserica Amzei no. 9), Bucharest, by Nicolae C. Mihăescu, 1908

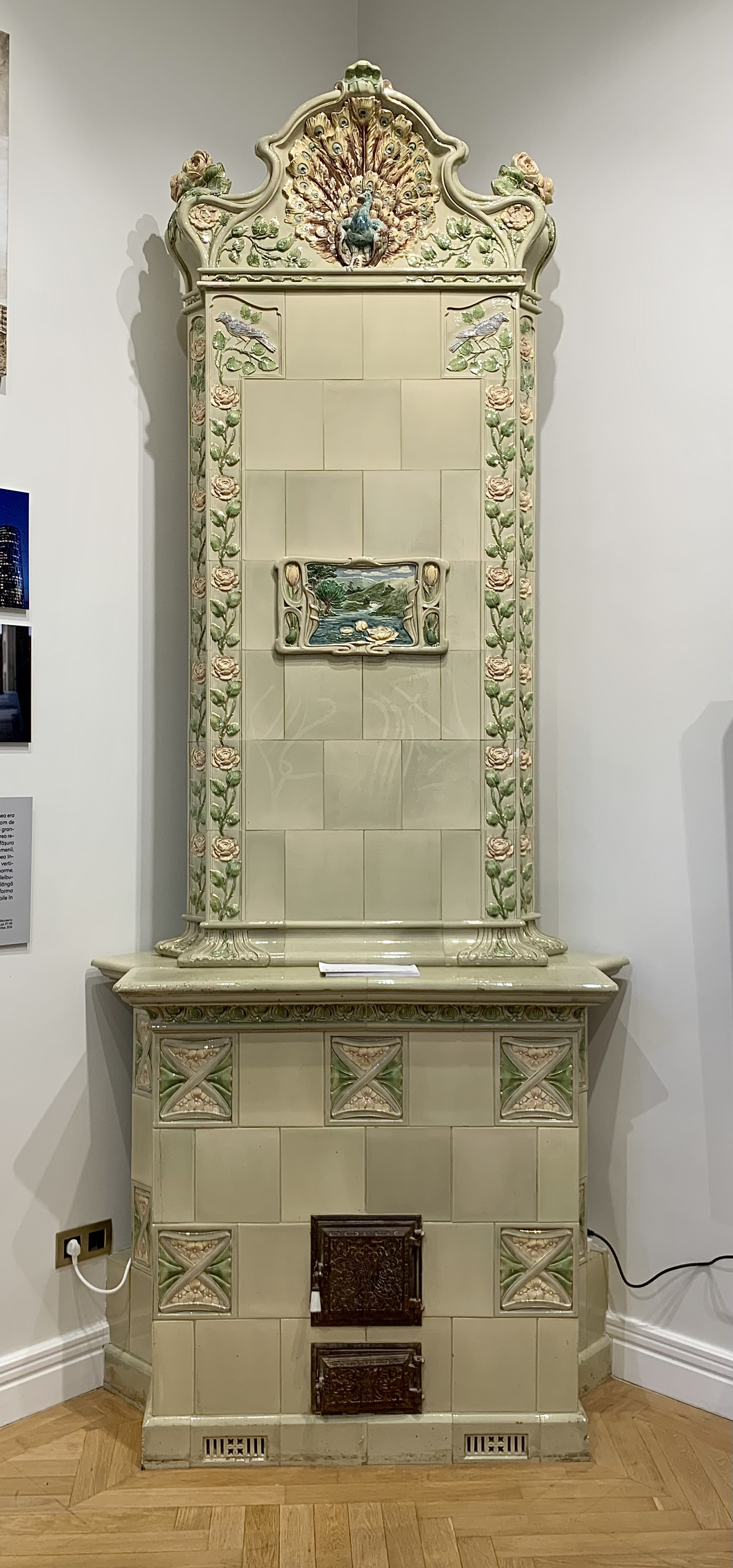
Stove in the Mița the Cyclist House, possibly designed by Nicolae C. Mihăescu, 1908

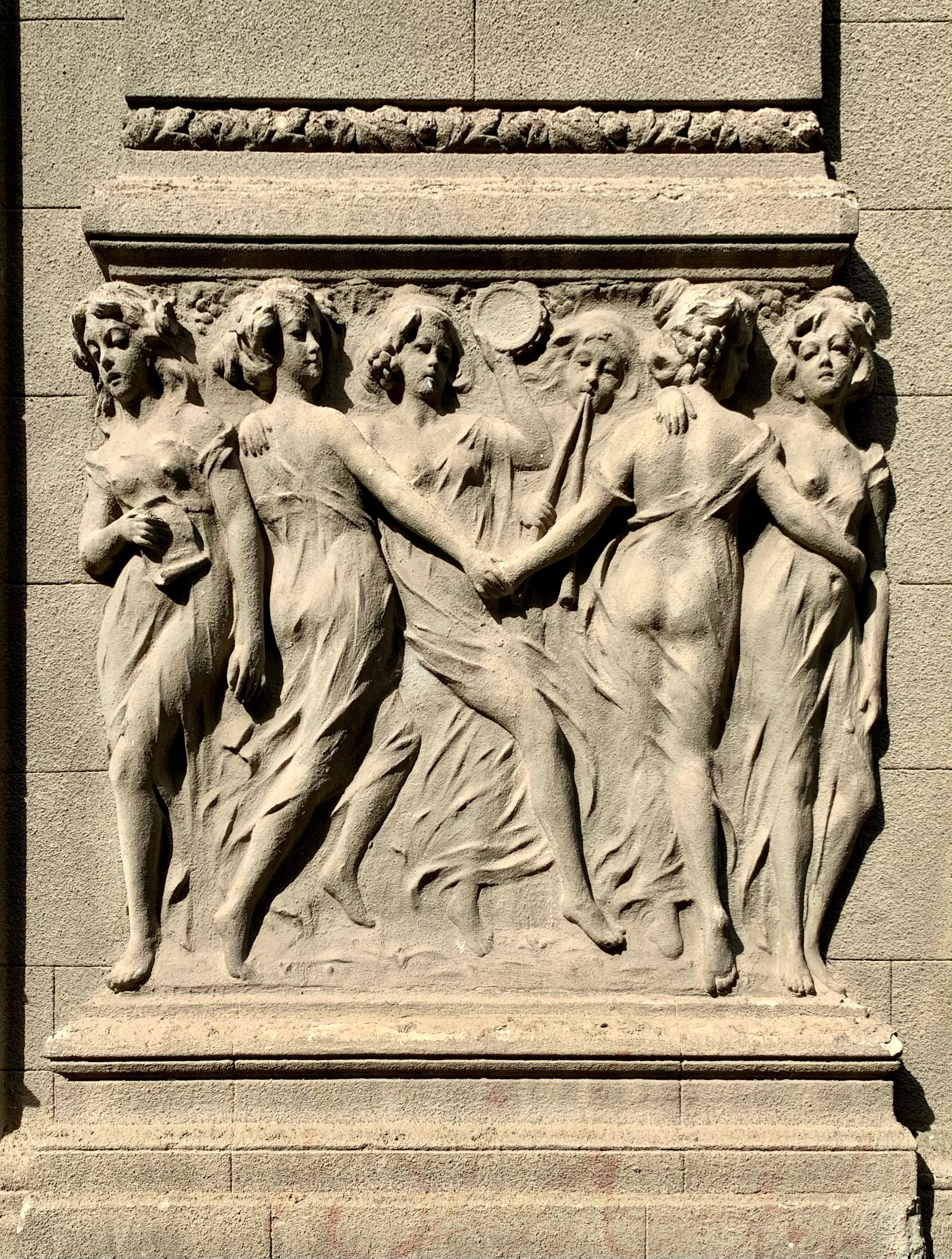
Relief on the Fanny and Isac Popper House (Strada Sfinților no. 1), Bucharest, by Alfred Popper, 1914

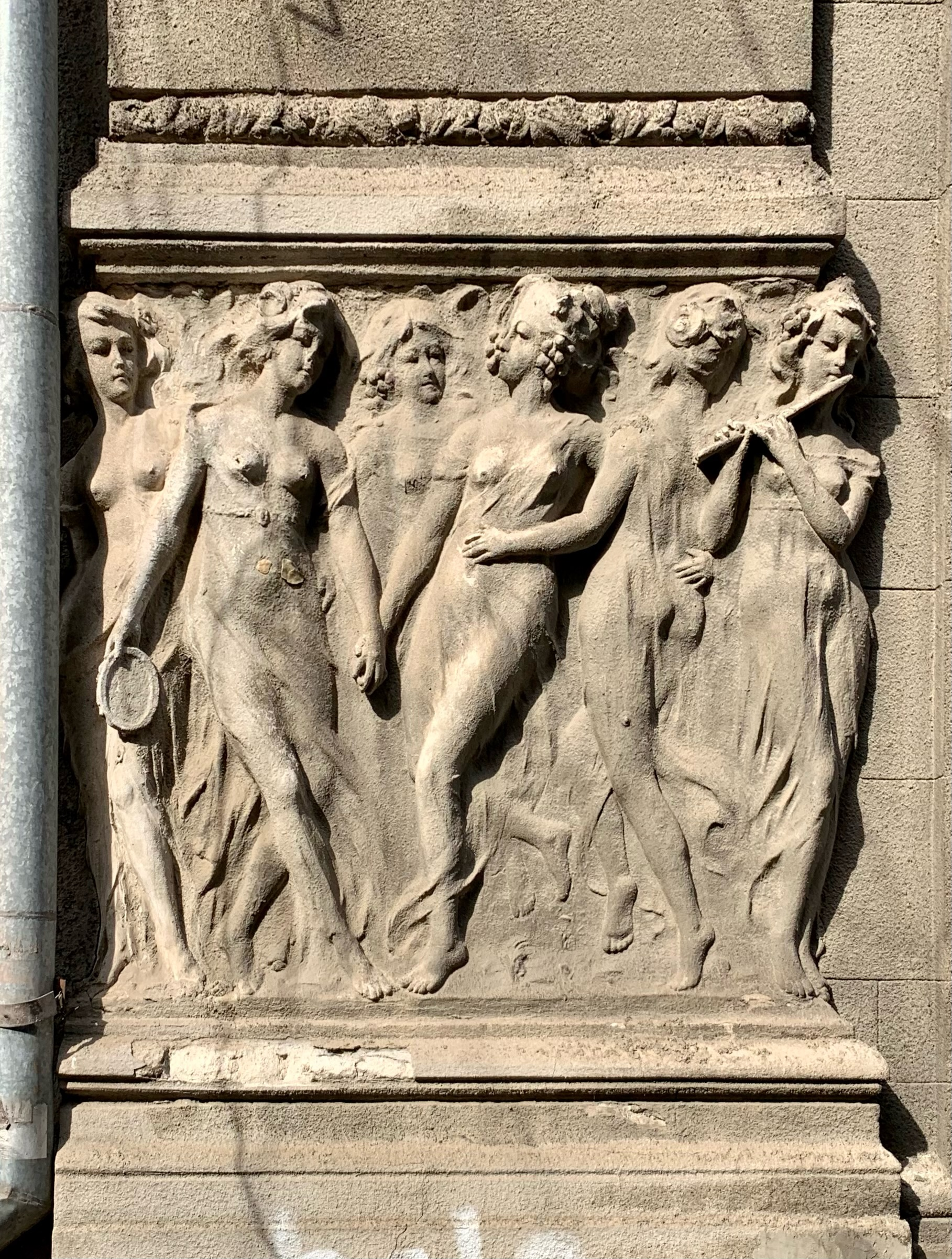
Relief on the Fanny and Isac Popper House (Strada Sfinților no. 1), Bucharest, by Alfred Popper, 1914

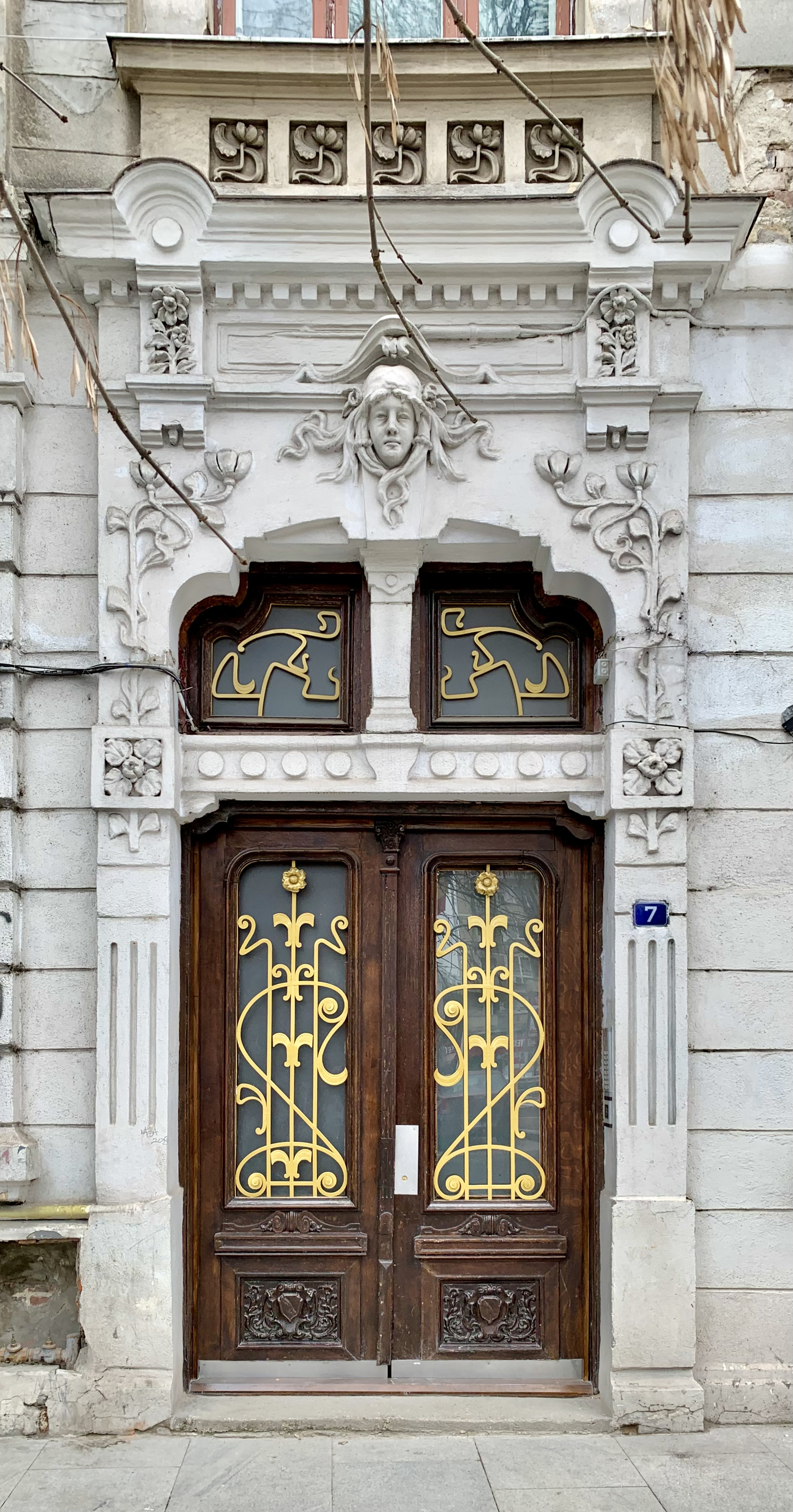
Piața Mihail Kogălniceanu no. 7, Bucharest, unknown architect, unknown date

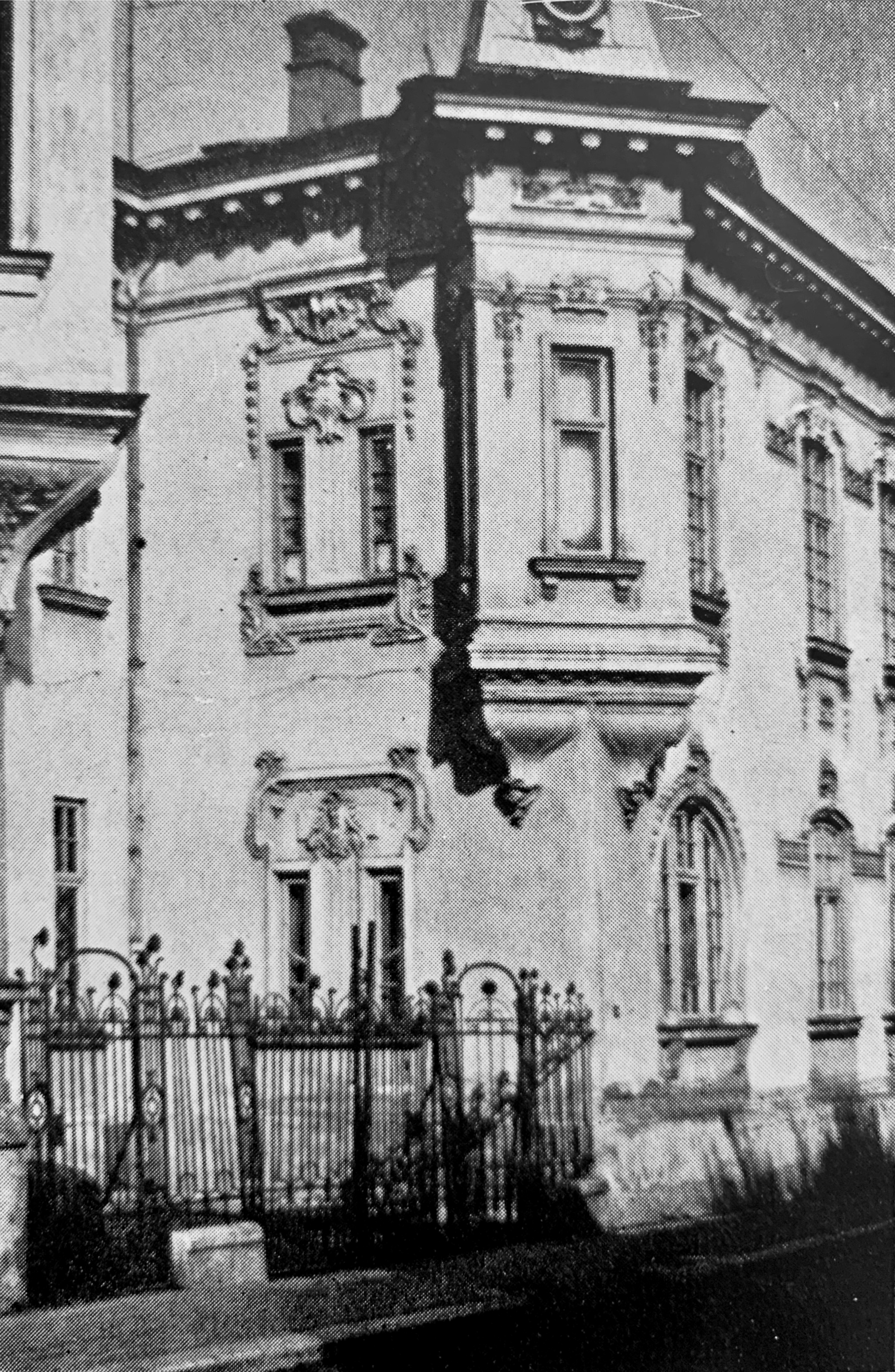
Mix of Beaux Arts and Art Nouveau - Strada Mircea Vodă no. 48, Bucharest, unknown architect, unknown date, demolished during the late 1980s

Art Nouveau appears in Romania during the same years as it does in Western Europe (early 1890s until the outbreak of World War I in 1914), but here few are the buildings in this style, the Beaux Arts being predominant. The most famous of them is the Constanța Casino. Most of the Romanian examples of Art Nouveau architecture are actually mixes of Beaux Arts and Art Nouveau, like the Romulus Porescu House or house no. 61 on Strada Vasile Lascăr, both in Bucharest. This is not different compared to what was happening in France, where eclecticism was for more popular, Art Nouveau buildings and structures being relatively rare. Despite the fact that most houses from the reign of Carol I are Beaux-Arts, some of them may have Art Nouveau stoves inside, since the style of the exterior won't always dictate the style of the stove or the entire interior.

Just like in the rest of Europe, the movement was not limited only to architecture, manifesting in design, illustration, painting, and other art media too. A good example is the Ileana magazine, that belonged to the society with the same name created by Ștefan Luchian, Constantin Artachino and Nicolae Vermont. Its pages were decorated with illustrations similar to Alphonse Mucha's posters.

== Between the wars - Romanian Revival, Moorish, Art Deco and Modernism (1918–1940) ==
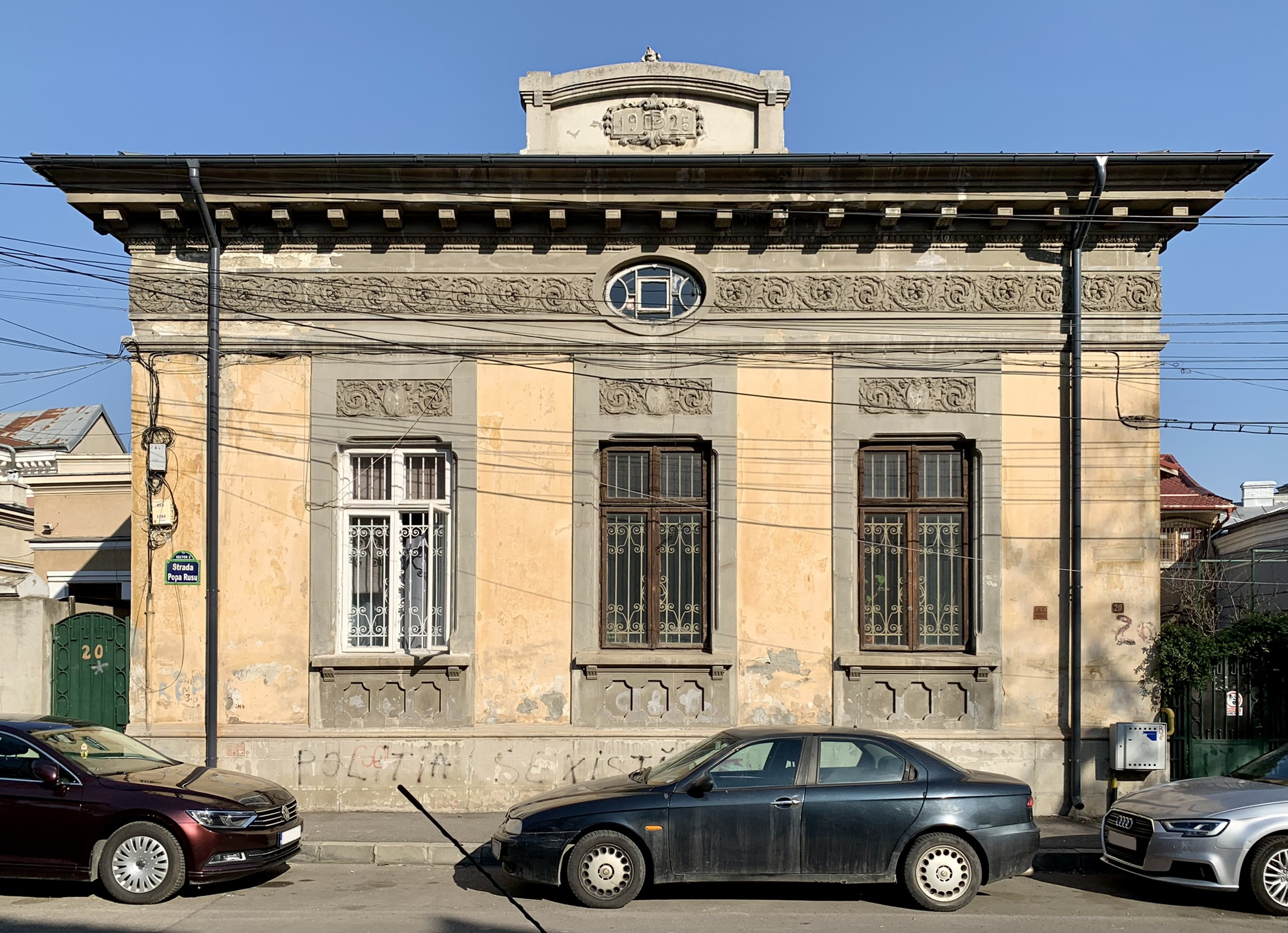
Late examples of Beaux Arts, or projects from the Belle Époque built during the interwar period, delayed because of WW1 - Strada Popa Rusu no. 20, Bucharest, 1925, unknown architect

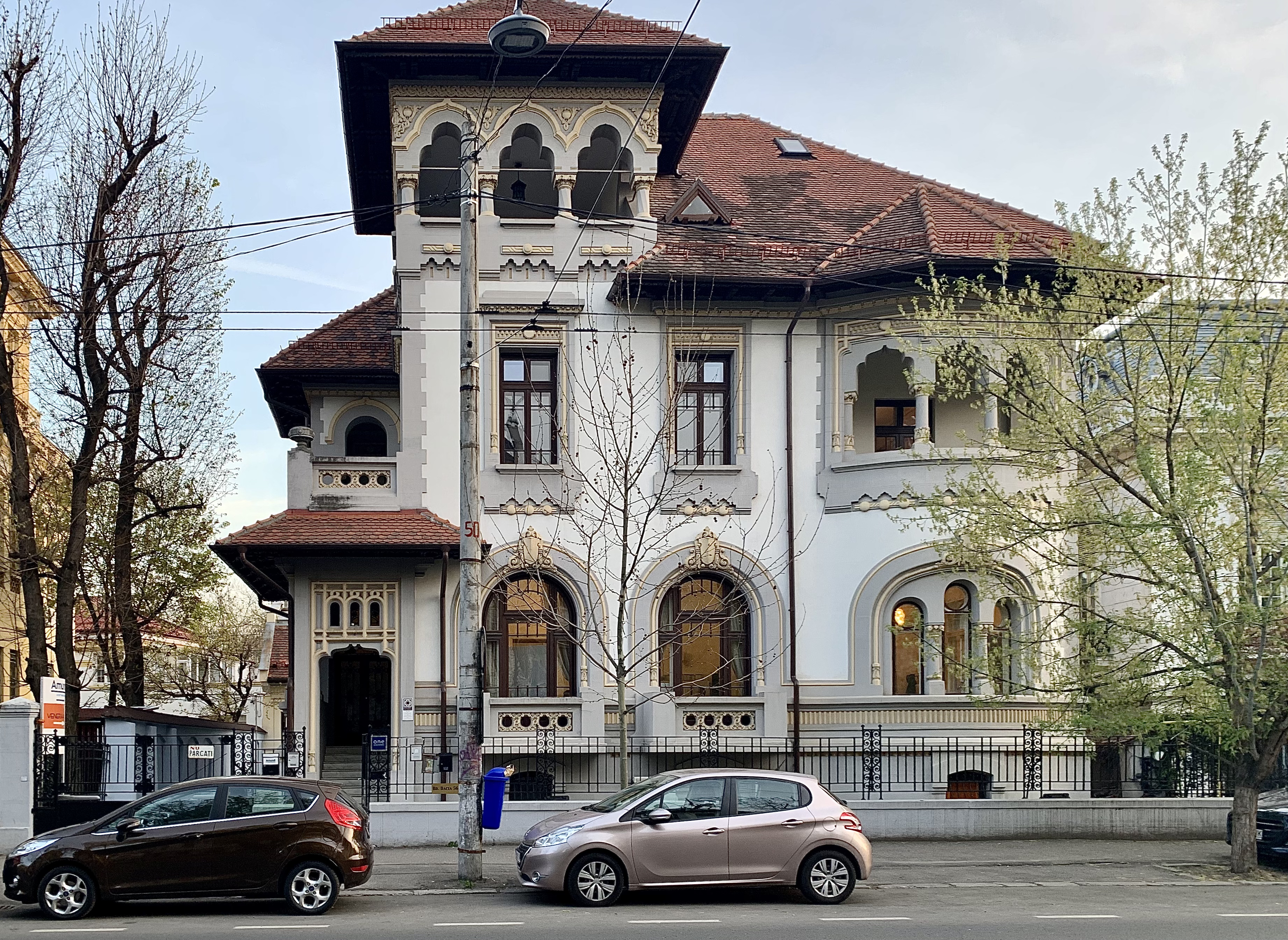
Romanian Revival architecture - C.N. Câmpeanu/Alfred E. Gheorghiu House (Bulevardul Dacia no. 56), Bucharest, c.1923, by Constantin Nănescu

Art Deco - Piața Sfântul Ștefan no. 1, Bucharest, Sady Herivan (?), 1932 (?)

Moorish - Emanoil Tătărăscu and Enescu House (Strada General Eremia Grigorescu no. 12), Bucharest, by Ion Giurgea, 1936

Rationalism - Autonomous Department of State Monopolies (Calea Victoriei no. 152), Bucharest, by Duiliu Marcu, 1936-1941

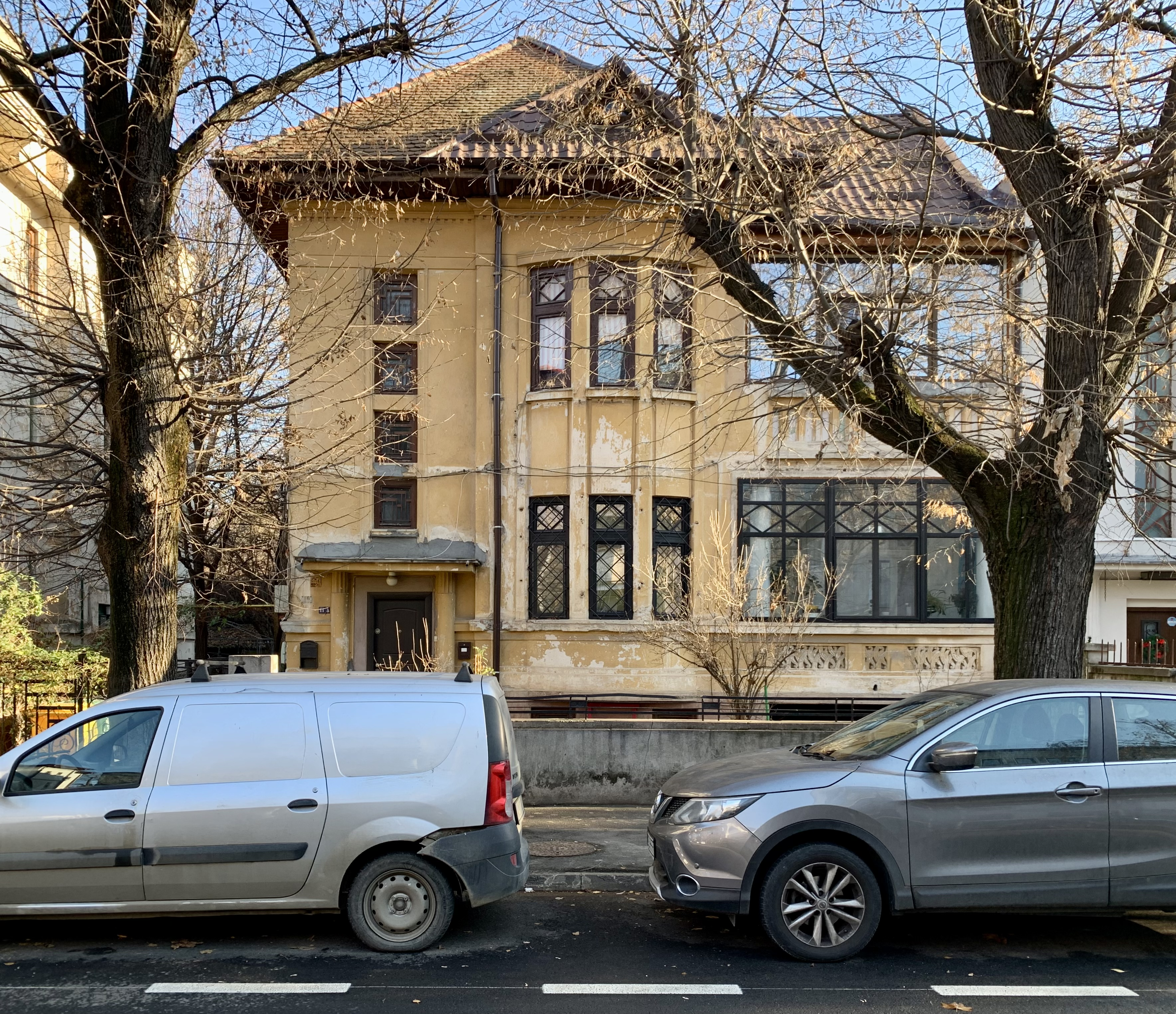
Mixes of styles - Strada Doctor Lister no. 11A, Bucharest, 1920s, unknown architect, mix of Romanian Revival Art Deco

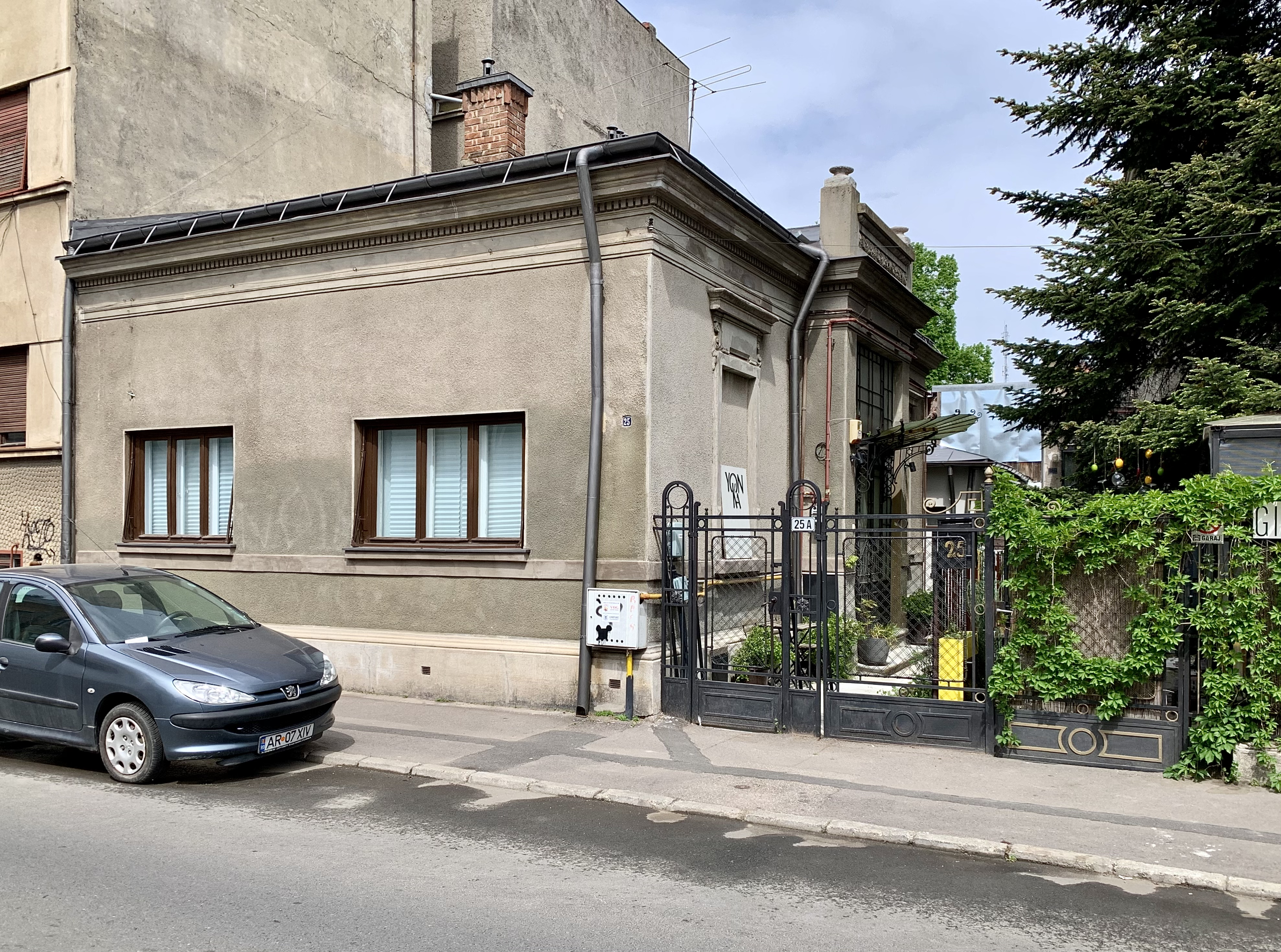
Style upgradation - Strada Planetlor no. 25A, Bucharest, street facade: 1930s, the rest of the house: c.1900, unknown architects

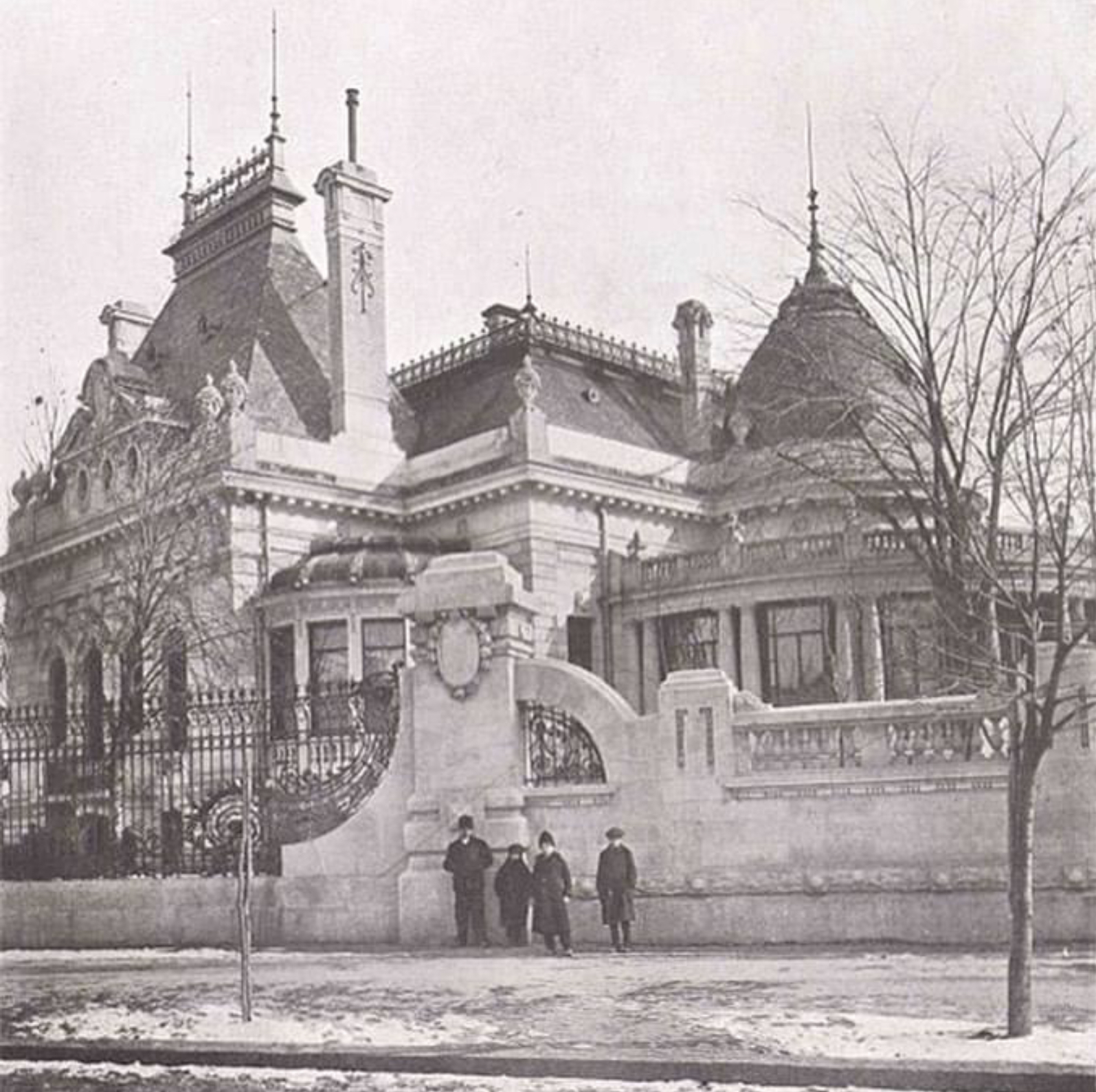
Demolitions - Alexandru Marghiloman House on Bulevardul Gheorghe Magheru, Bucharest, 1890, demolished in the 1920s and replaced with the ARO Building on Bulevardul Gheorghe Magheru

The interwar period and the WW2 one was dominated by two styles: Romanian Revival and Modernism (under the forms of Art Deco, Stripped Classicism and later Bauhaus). Before becoming mainstream, Modernism was in a conflict with the adepts of the Romanian Revival style. They blamed Modernists for lacking a National spirit. However, this opposition will fade away over time, as Modernism became the dominant style.

Another style of the interwar period was Rationalism (Romanian: stilul rațional italian), very similar to the architecture from Mussolini's Italy and Hitler's Germany. Buildings in this style are quite rare, most of them being institutions, like the Victoria Palace or the Carol I National Defence University, both in Bucharest. During the 1930s, the Moorish style was popular for houses, using Romanesque, Gothic and Renaissance elements, and big plane surfaces.

Many impressive villas that show these styles can be found in the Aviatorilor neighborhood in Bucharest, due to the fact that this area was empty before 1911. Another district with similar opulent villas is Cotroceni.

During the Belle Époque and the interwar period, it was very important for people to have houses fashionable with the preferences and the styles of the time. Because of this, a few houses from the reign of Carol I were modernized, due to the fact that styles like Gothic Revival, Neoclassicism, Beaux-Arts or Art Nouveau were considered by some as being "passé", "dated" or "out of fashion". This happed rarely, and examples of 19th century buildings whose facades were changed with something Art Deco or Modern are rare. They are relatively easy to spot, due to their proportions and sizes being the same as the rest of the Belle Époque houses, with ornaments belonging to other styles.

Because of this perception of pre-WW1 architecture as "dated" or its lack of appreciation, some impressive buildings from that time were demolished. One of the best examples is the Marghiloman House, that stood where the ARO Building on Bulevardul Gheorghe Magheru is now in Bucharest.

=== The national or Romanian Revival style ===
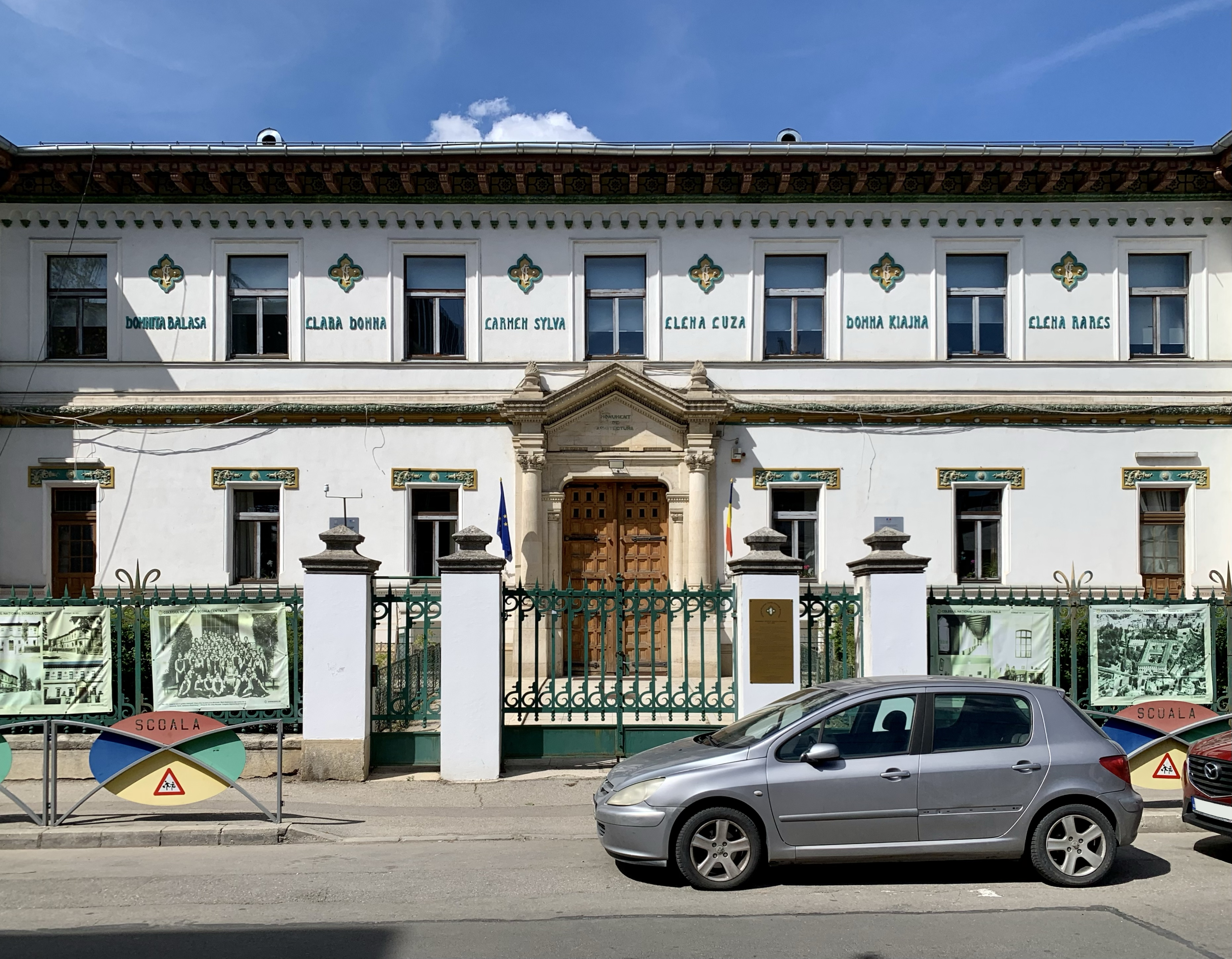
Central Girls' School (Strada Icoanei no. 3-5), Bucharest, by Ion Mincu, 1890

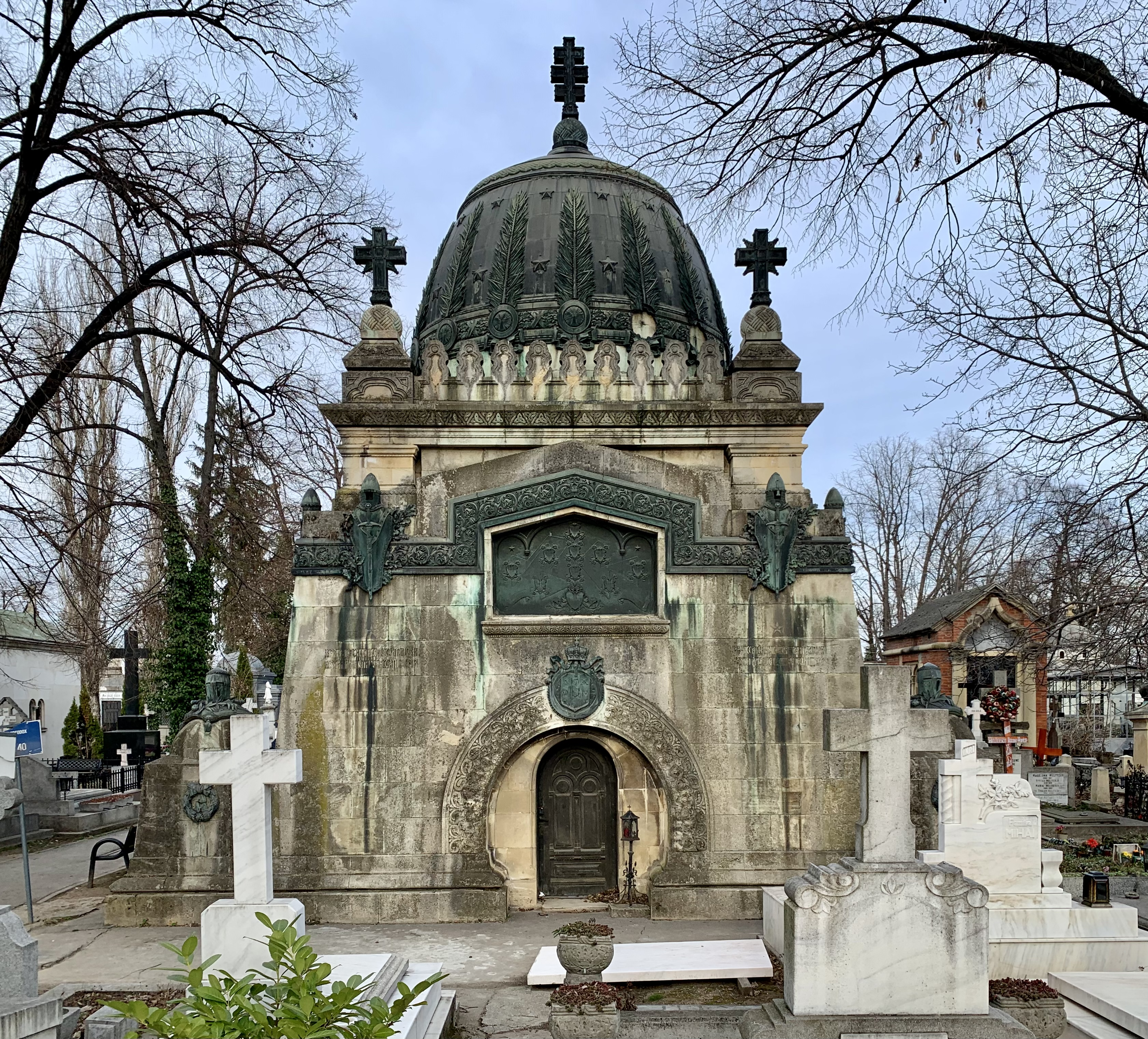
Cantacuzino Tomb in the Bellu Cemetery, Bucharest, by Ion Mincu, c.1900

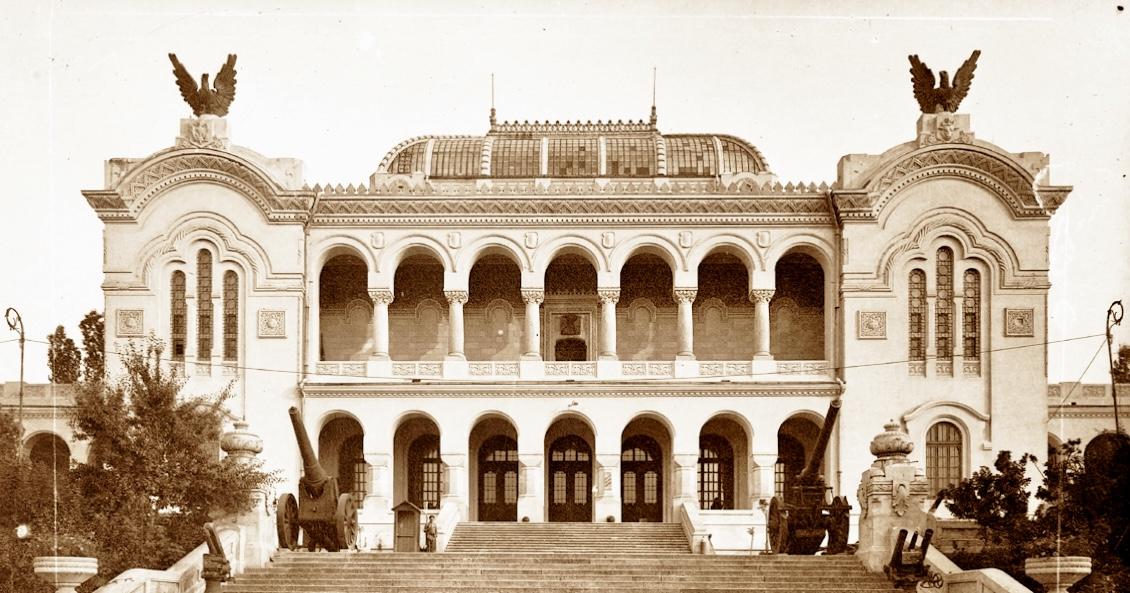
Palace of the Arts, part of the 1906 General Romanian Exhibition in the Carol Park, Bucharest, by Victor Ștefănescu and Ștefan Burcuș, 1905-1906

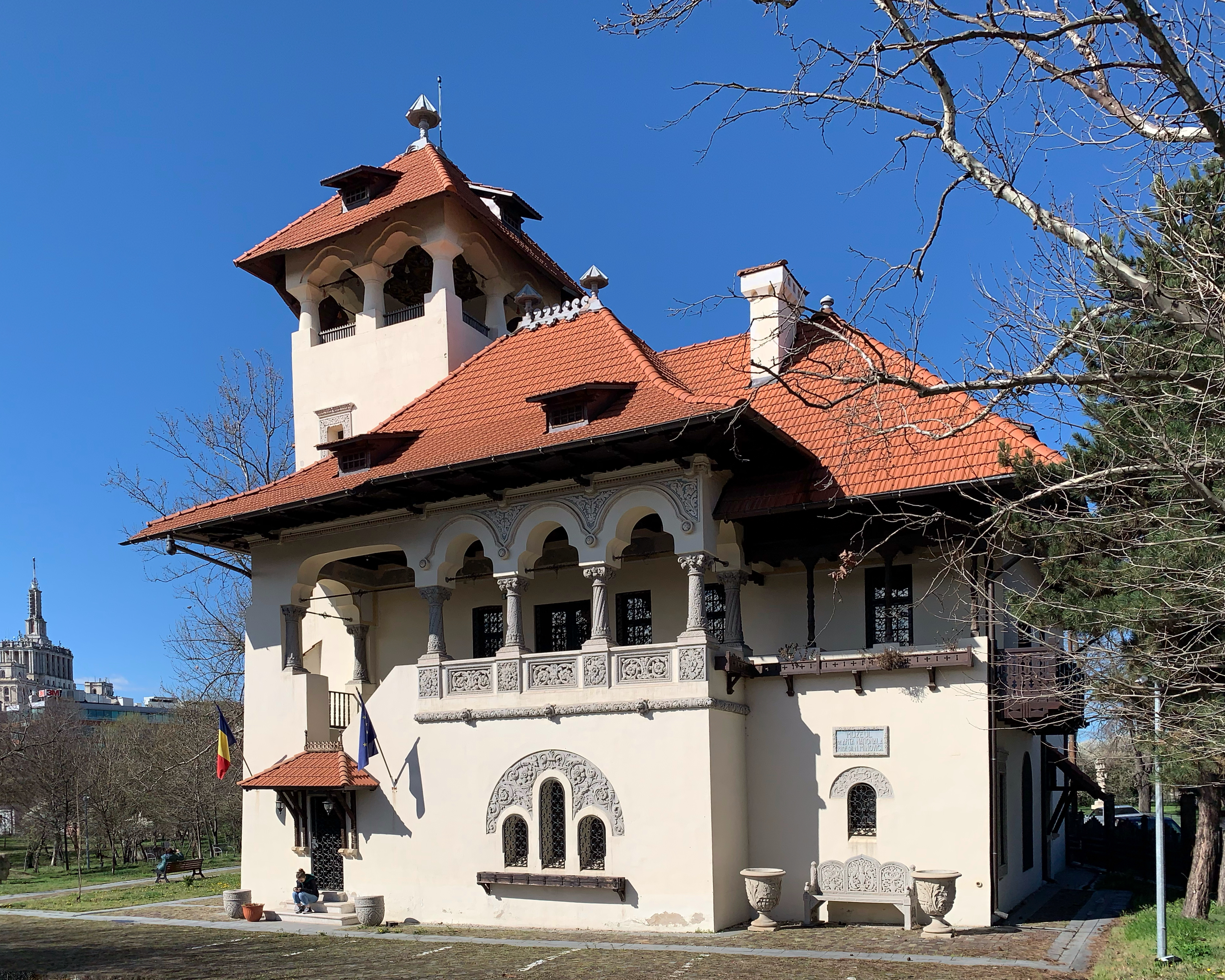
Nicolae Minovici House (Strada Doctor Nicolae Minovici no. 1), today the Nicolae Minovici Folk Art Museum, Bucharest, by Cristofi Cerchez, 1906-1907

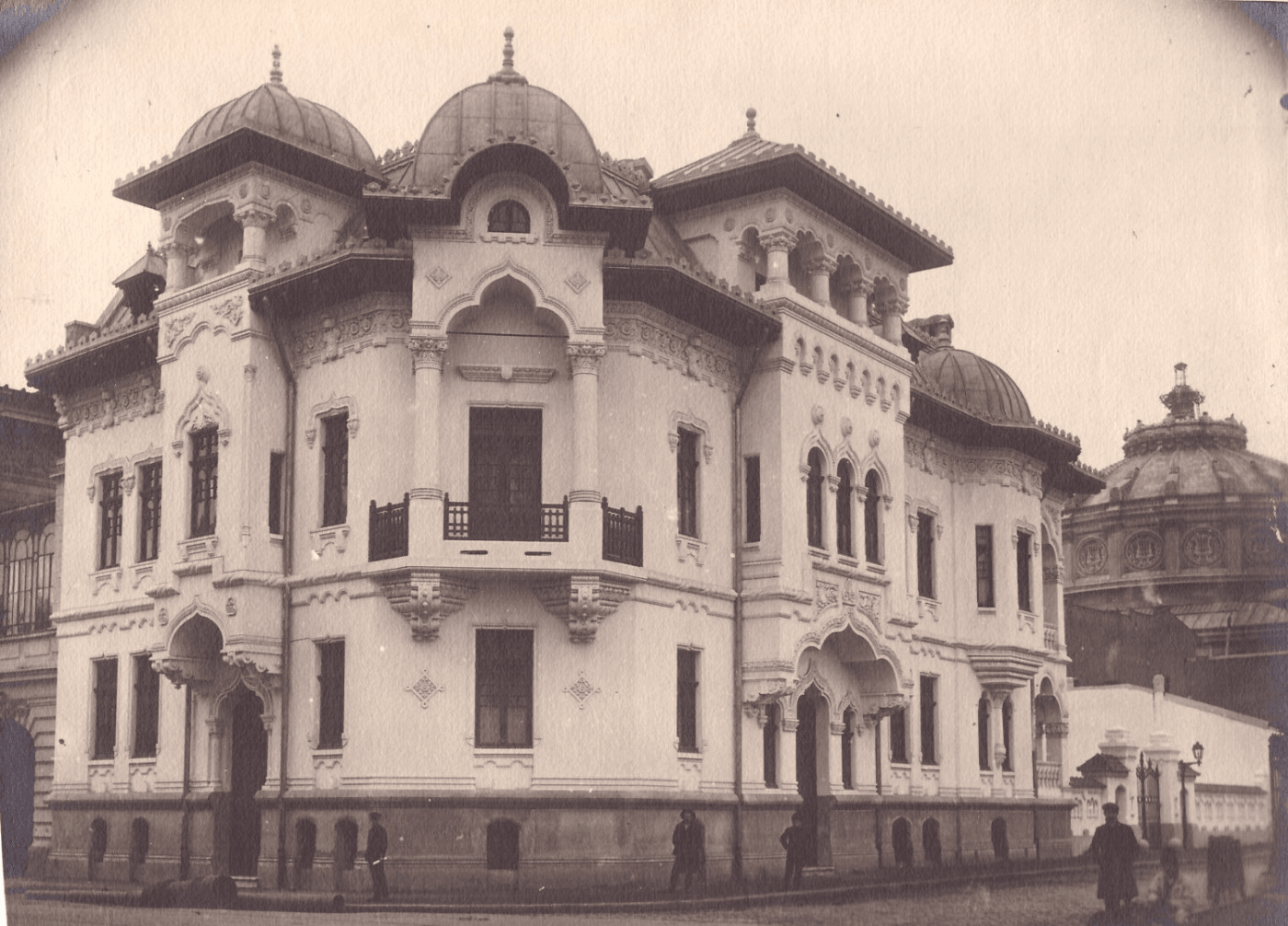
Vasile Zottu House (Strada C.A. Rosetti no. 7), Bucharest, unknown architect, 1909

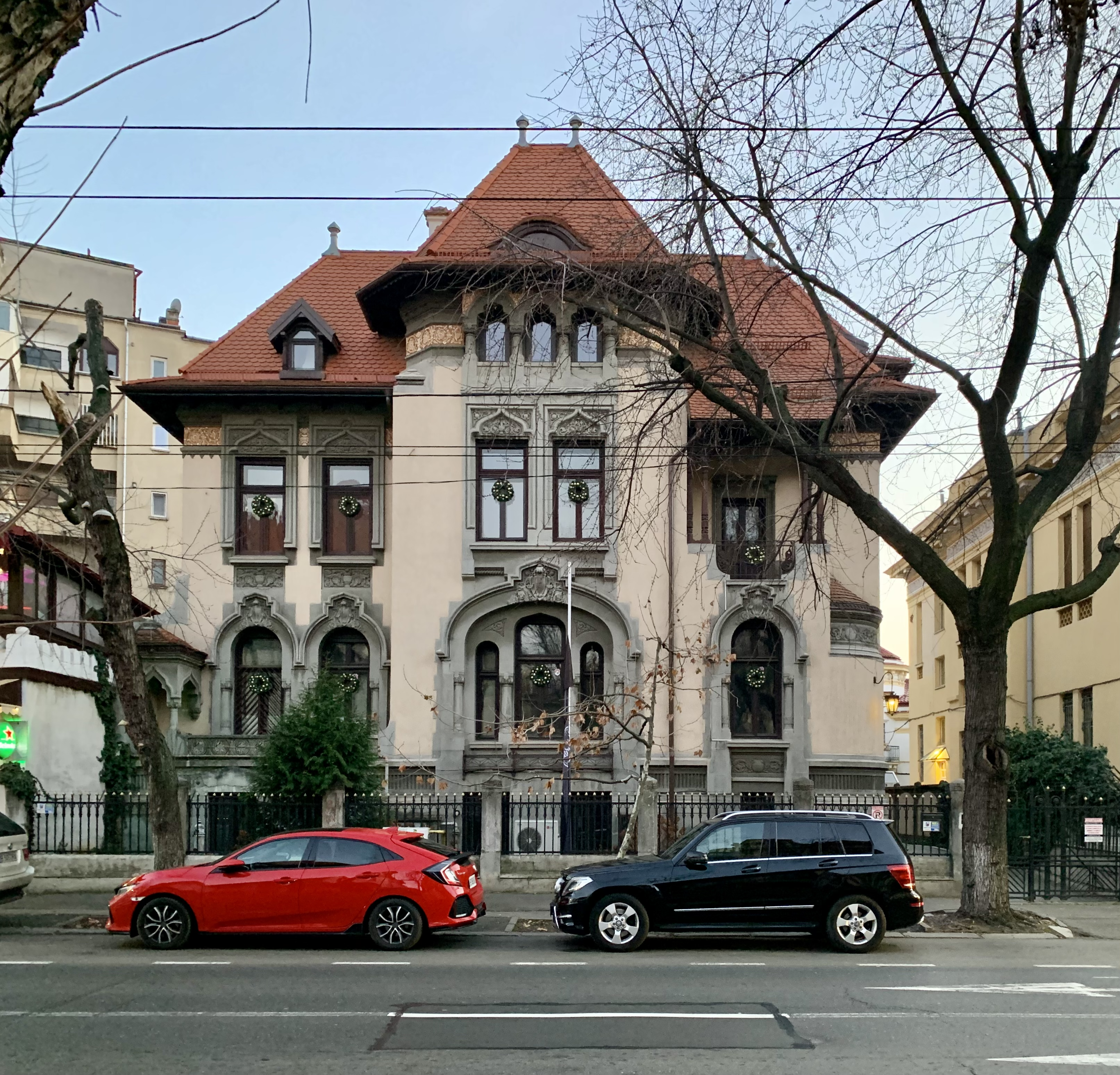
Aurel Mincu House (Bulevardul Dacia no. 60), Bucharest, by Arghir Culina, 1910

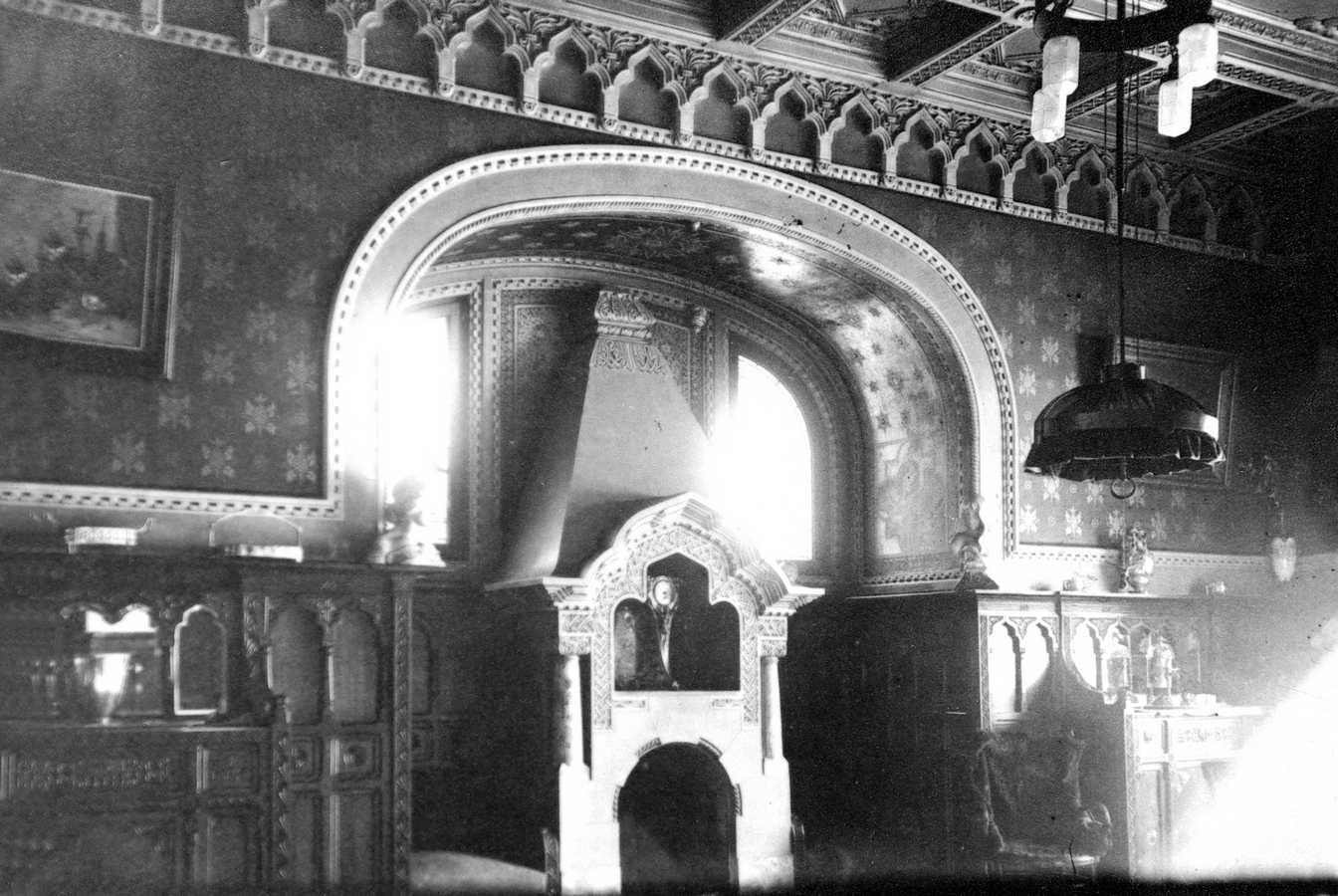
Interior of the Aurel Mincu House, Bucharest, by Arghir Culina, 1910

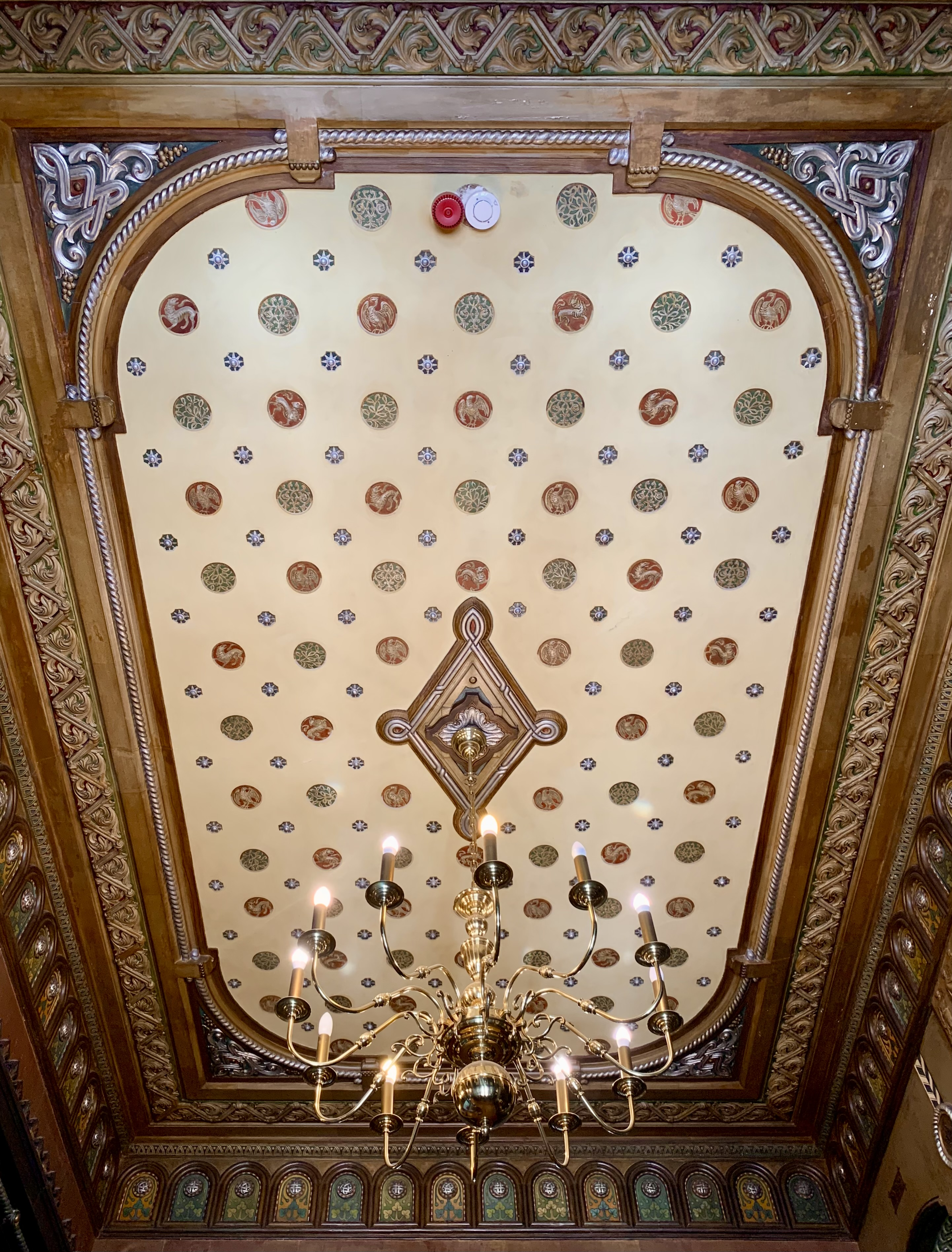
Ceiling from the Gheorghe Petrașcu House (Piața Romană nr. 5), Bucharest, by Spiru Cegăneanu, 1912

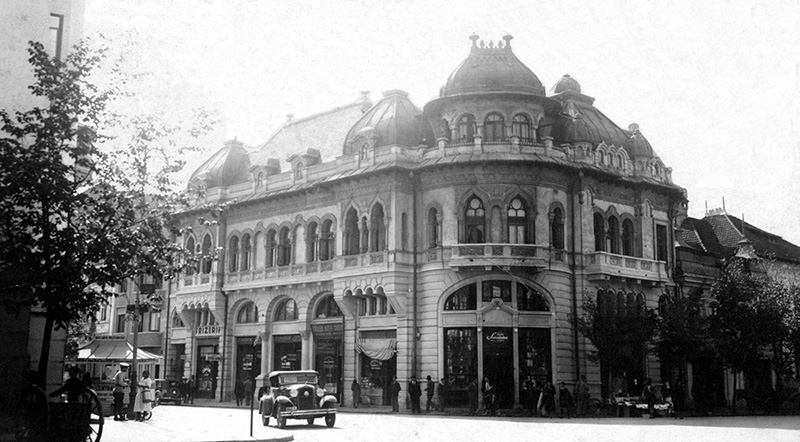
Toma T. Socolescu House, Ploiești, by Toma T. Socolescu, 1914-c.1918

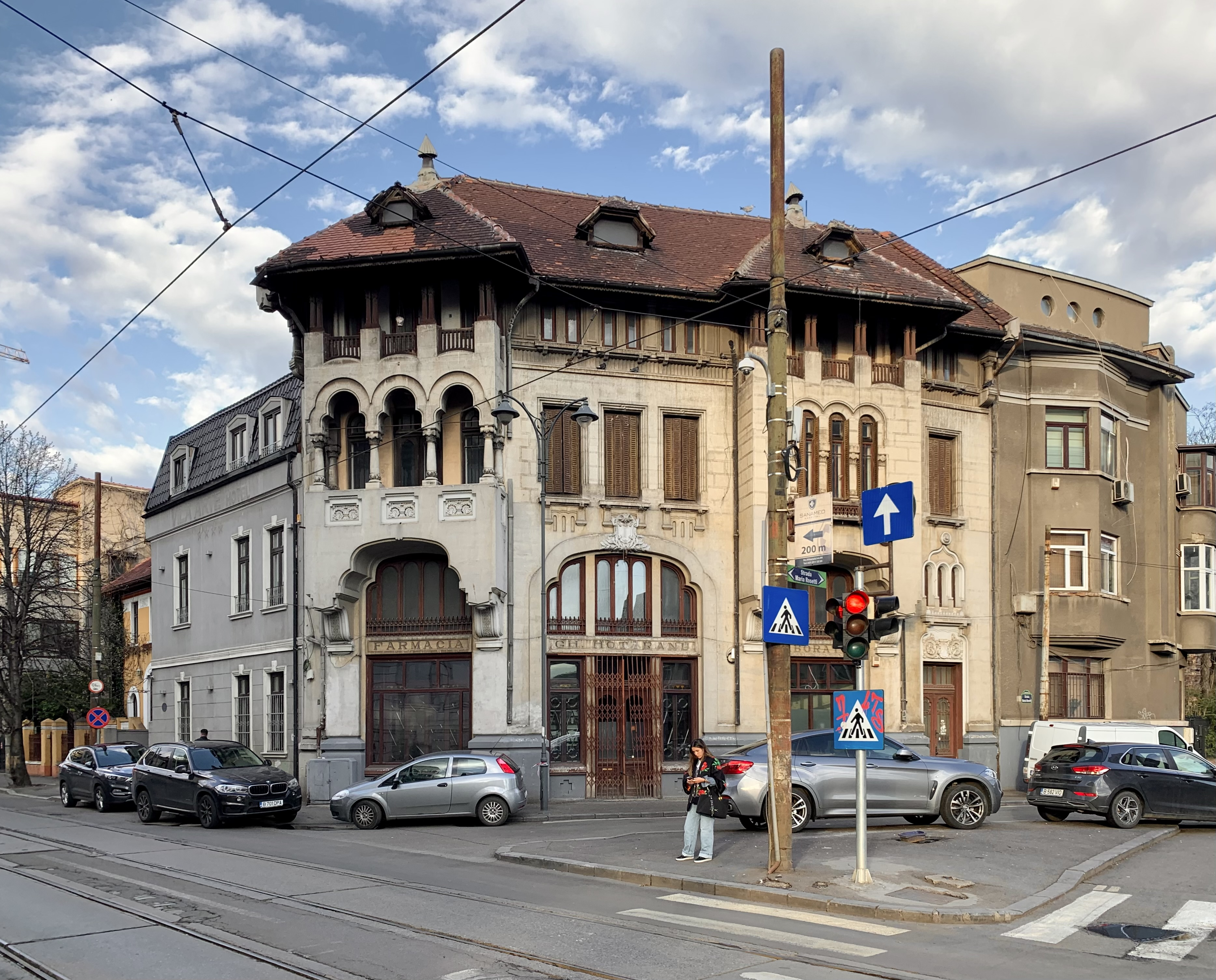
Gheorghe Hotăranu House (Strada Vasile Lascăr no. 76), Bucharest, by Statie Ciortan, 1925

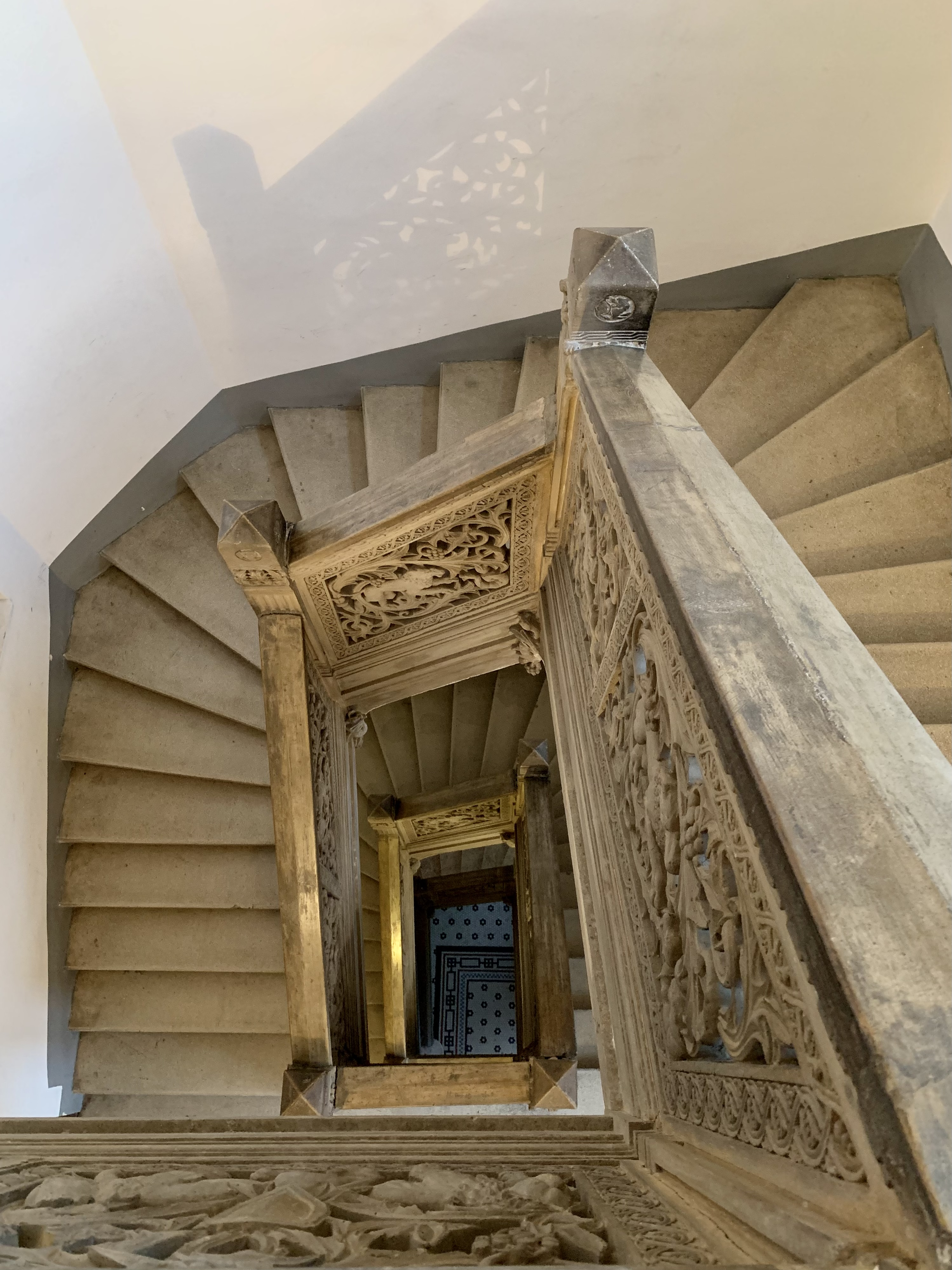
Staircase of the Alexandru and Lucreția Alexandrescu Building (Bulevardul Lascăr Catargiu no. 9), Bucharest, by Alfred Popper, 1926-1927

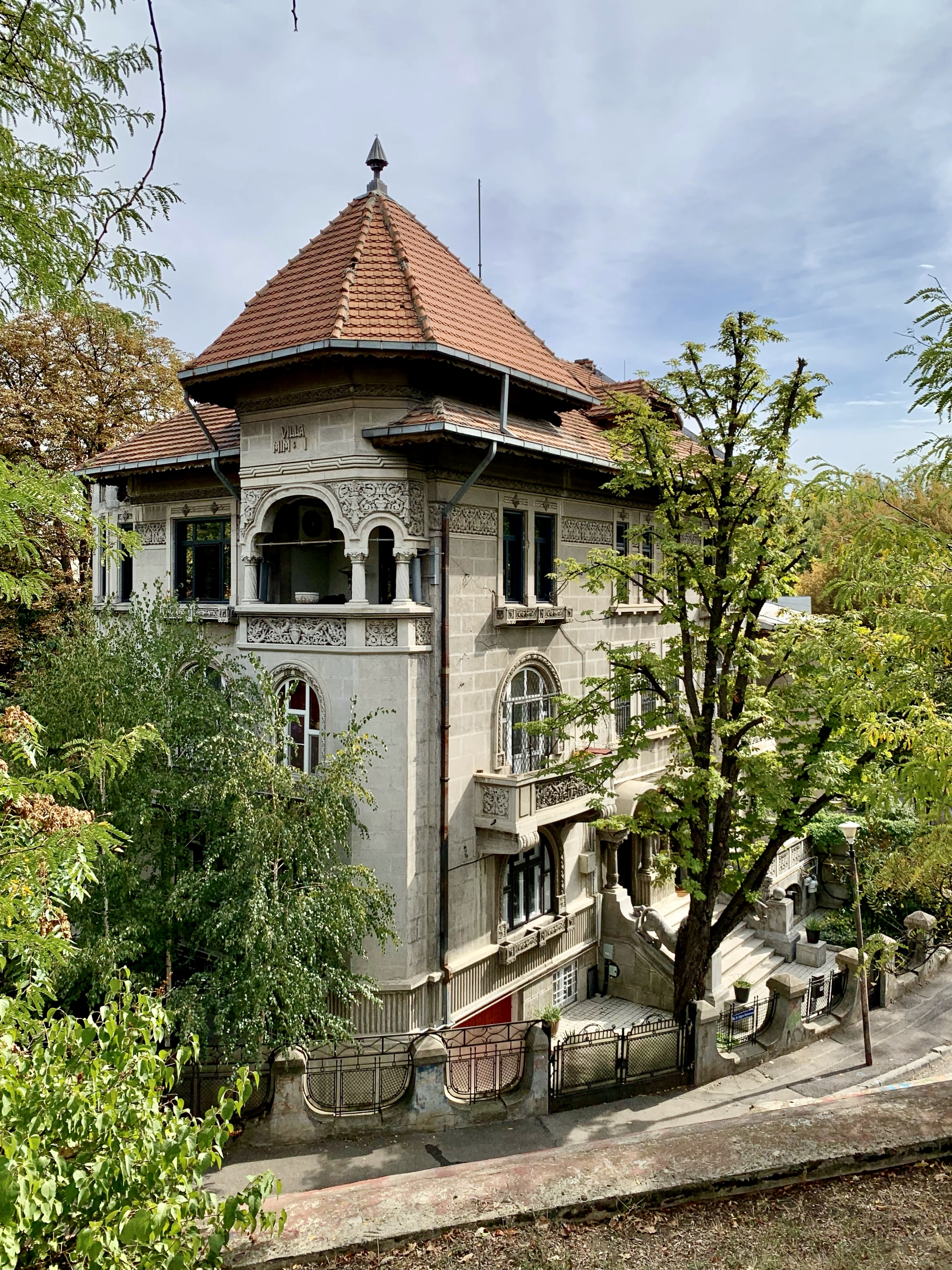
Strada Grigore Romniceanu no. 54, Bucharest, unknown architect, c.1930

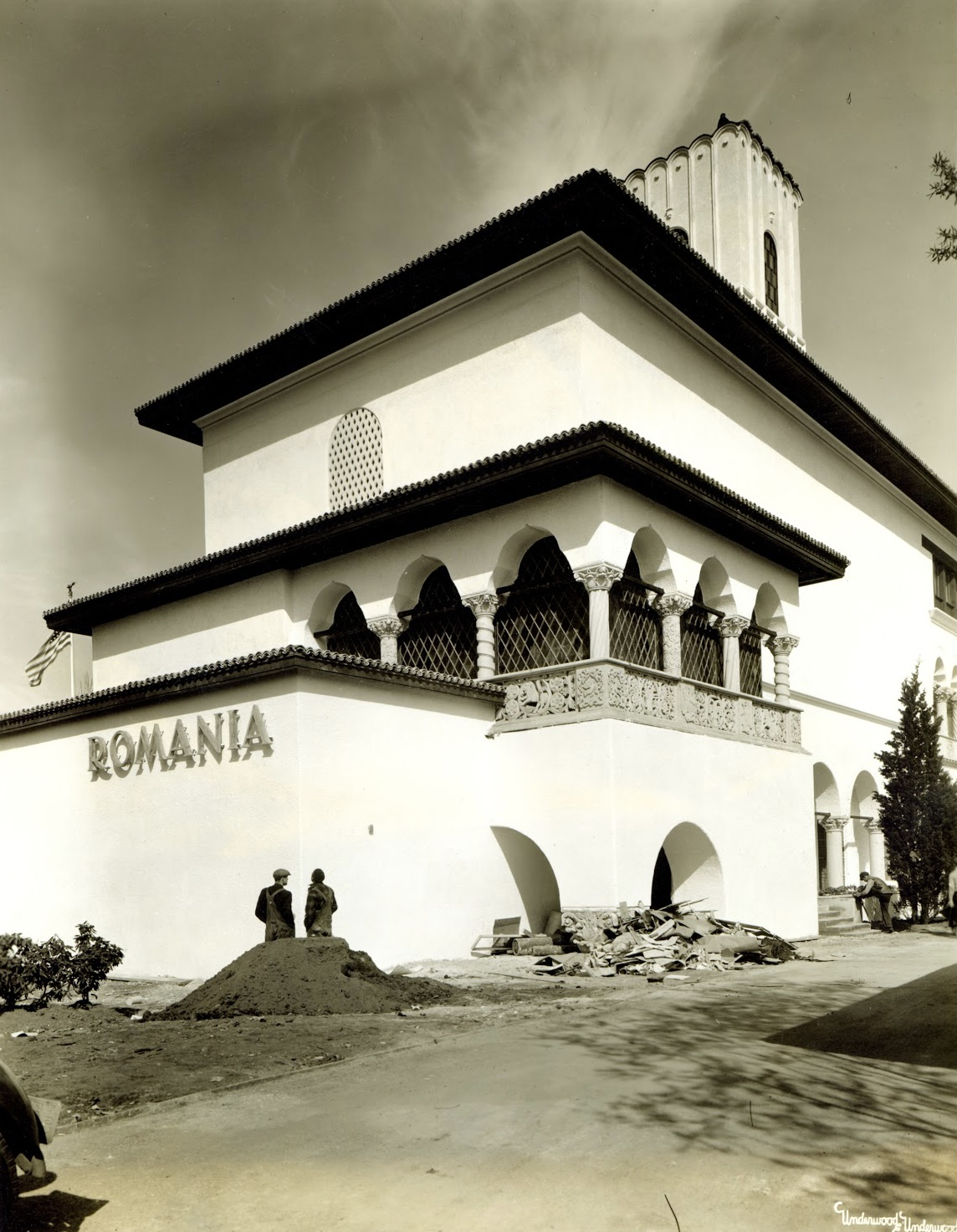
Romanian restaurant at the 1939 World's Fair, New York, by Octav Doicescu, 1939

During the 1890s and 1900s, the Romanian Revival style appears and is developed. Ion Mincu, who studied at the École des Beaux-Arts from where in 1884 receives his architect diploma, is the first Romanian architect who, rejecting the Beaux-Arts style, promotes traditional Romanian architecture. During his 30-year career, studying the old Brâncovenesc monuments, he built using this style, with works like the Lahovari House, the Kiseleff Roadside Buffet or the Central Girls' School in Bucharest. Although thought in foreign schools and academies, other Romanian architects, like Petre Antonescu or Cristofi Cerchez, start building in this style. Romanian Revival buildings are erected both before and after WW1, the 1920s being the peak of popularity of the style.

=== Art Deco ===
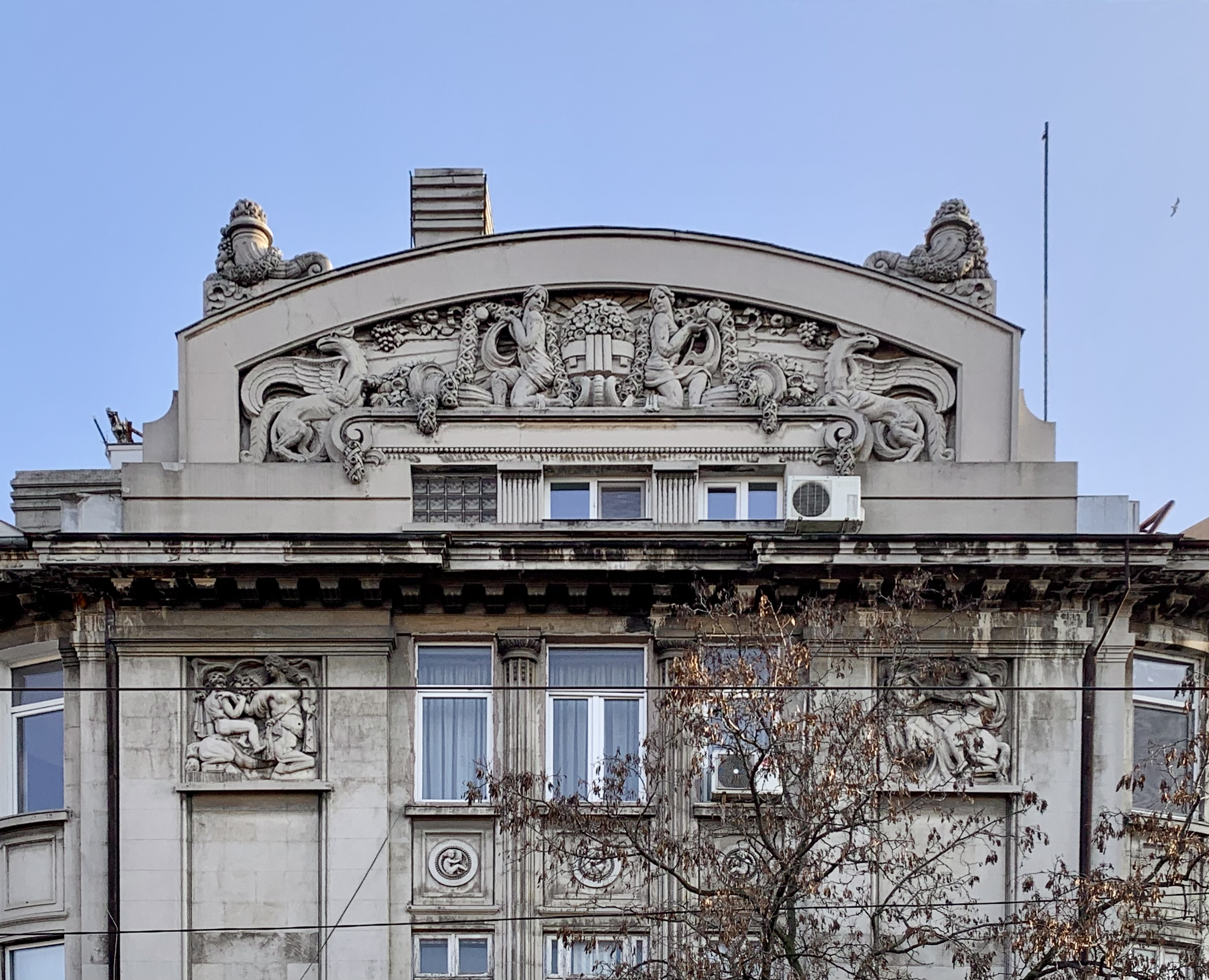
Early - Pediment of the Mihai Zisman House (Calea Călărașilor no. 44) in Bucharest, Romania, by architect Soru, 1920

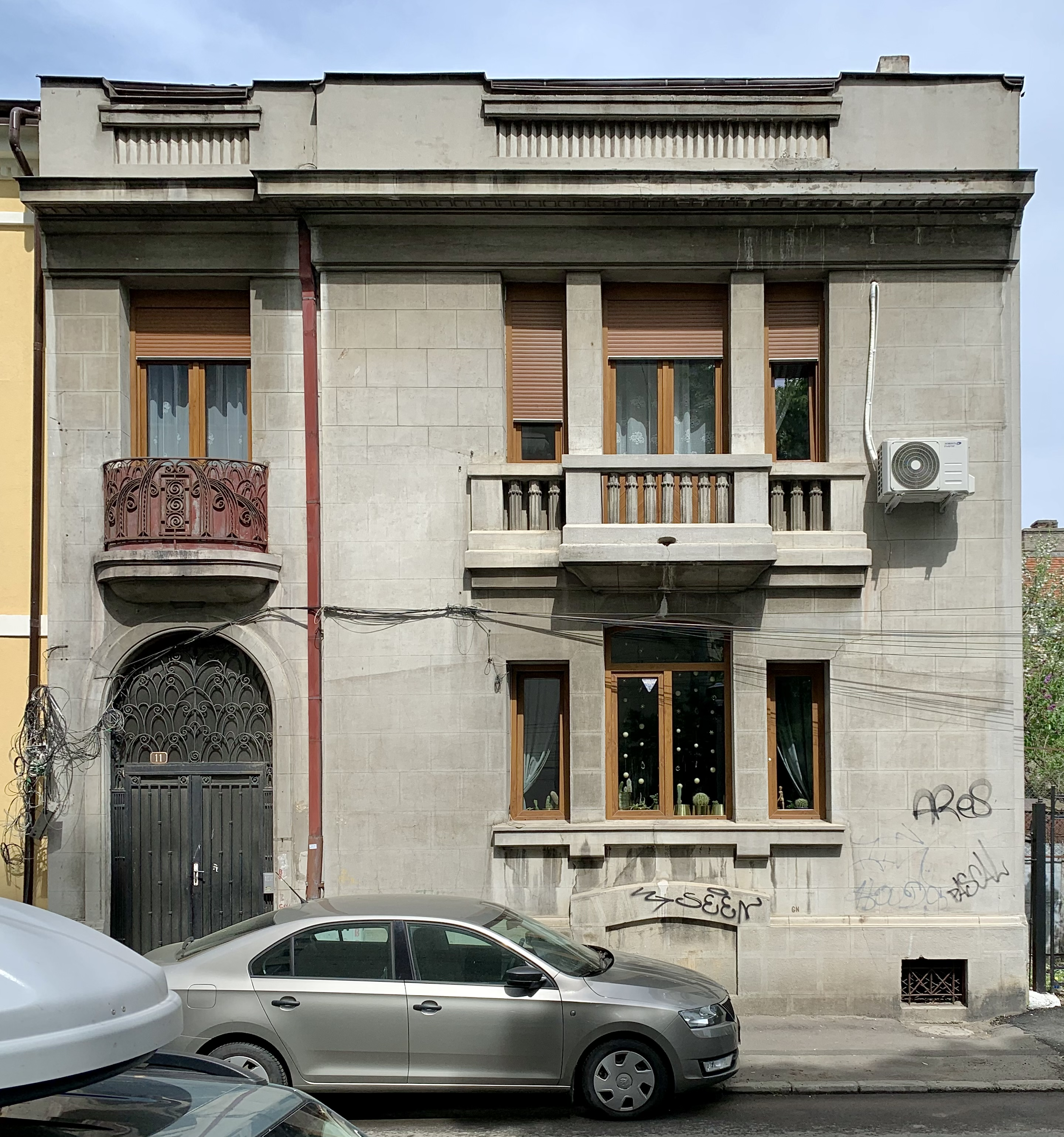
Early - Strada Plantelor no. 11, Bucharest, unknown architect, c.1925

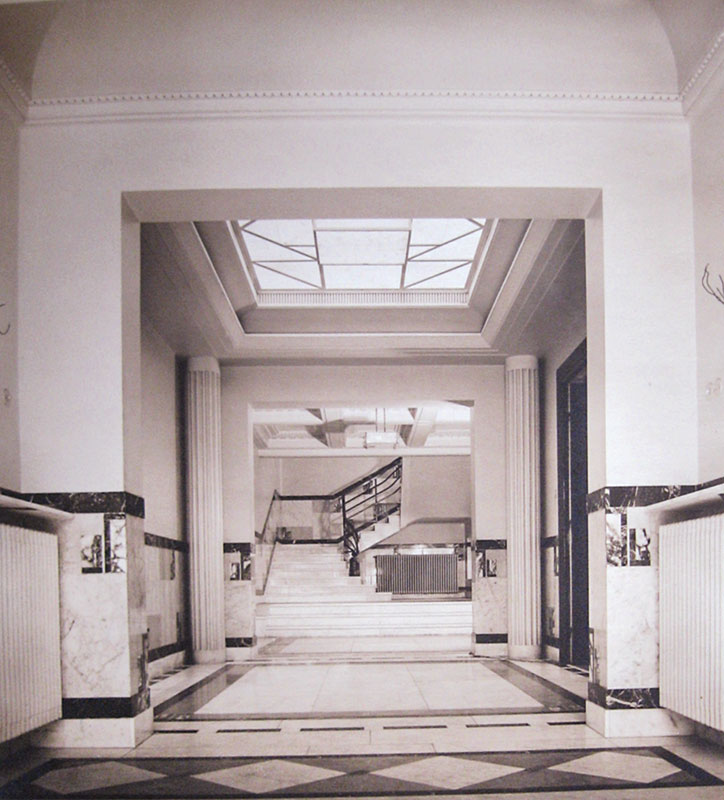
Mature: Interior of Calea Victoriei no. 100, Bucharest, by Nicolae Nenciulescu, 1929

Early - Top of the Union Hotel (Strada Ion Câmpineanu no. 11), Bucharest, by Arghir Culina, 1929-1931

Mature - Detail of the Telephones Company Building (Calea Victoriei no. 37), Bucharest, by Walter Froy, Louis S. Weeks and Edmond van Saanen Algi, 1929-1934

Early - Lido Hotel (Bulevardul Gheorghe Magheru no. 5-7), Bucharest, by Ernest Donaud, 1930

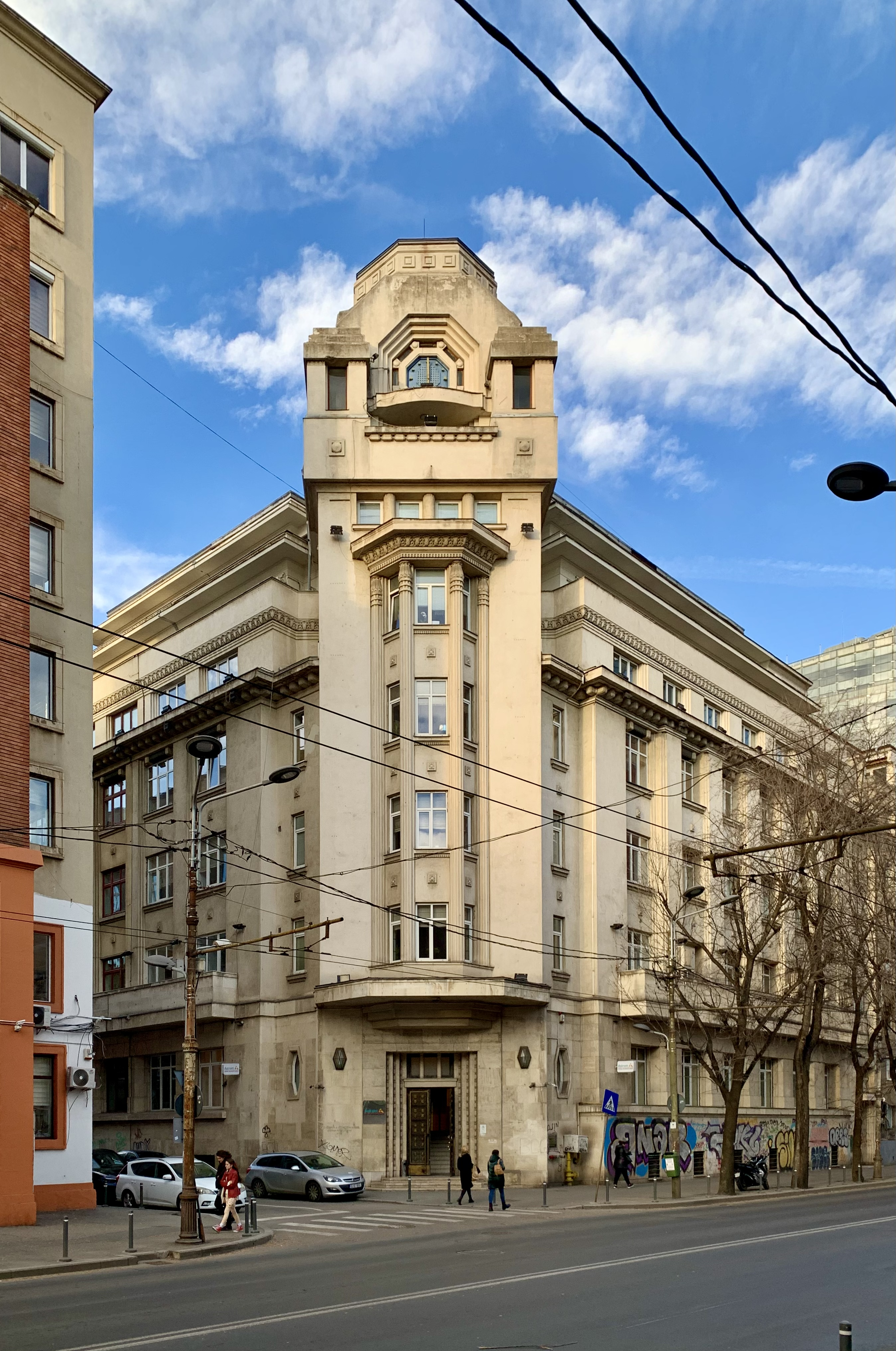
Early - Central Social Insurance Company Building (now the Asirom Building, Bulevardul Carol no. 31-33), Bucharest, by Ion Ionescu, c.1930

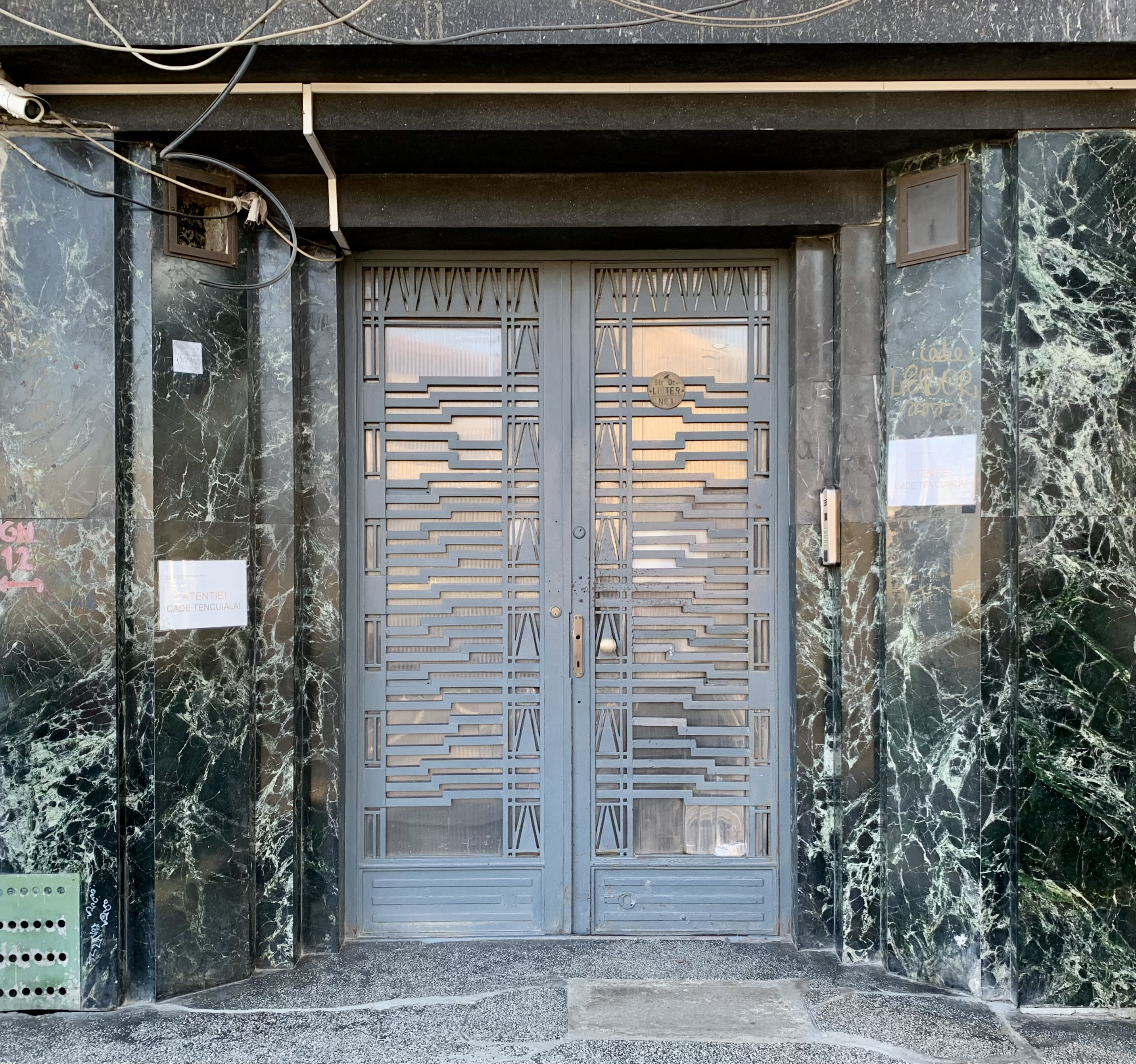
Mature - Door of Strada Doctor Lister no. 1, Bucharest, unknown architect, c.1930

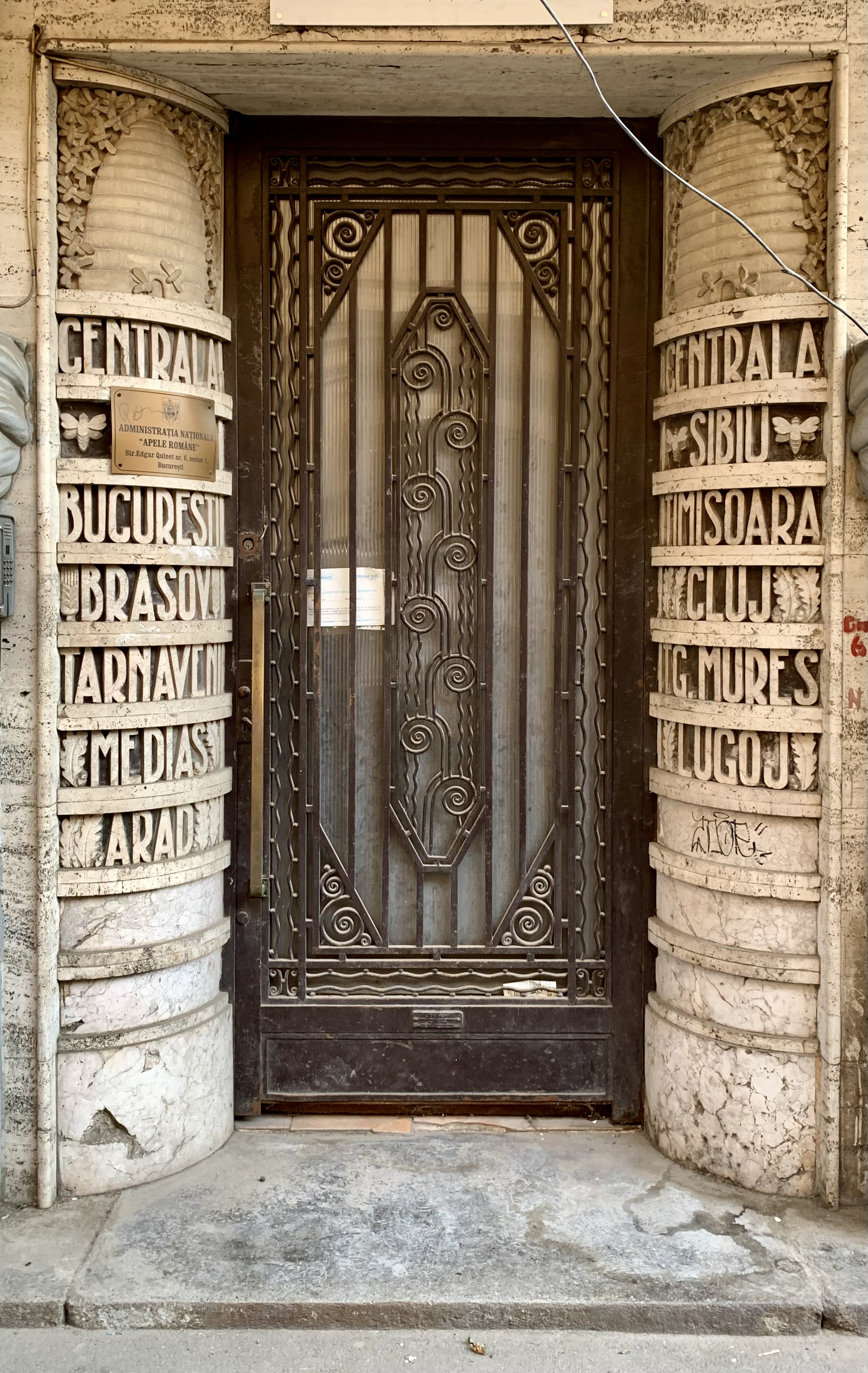
Early - Door of the "Albina" (the Bee) Bank Building (now the "Romanian Waters" National Administration, Strada Edgar Quinet no. 6), Bucharest, unknown architect, 1935

Mature - Bulevardul Dacia no. 66, Bucharest, by Jean Monda, 1931

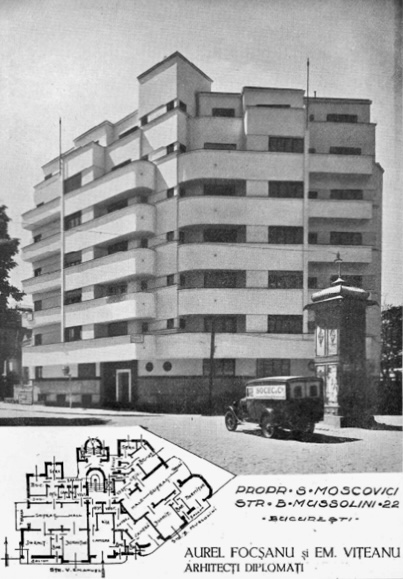
Streamline Moderne - Moscovici Building (Strada Nicolae Iorga no. 22), Bucharest, by Aurel Focșanu and Emil Vițeanu, c.1930

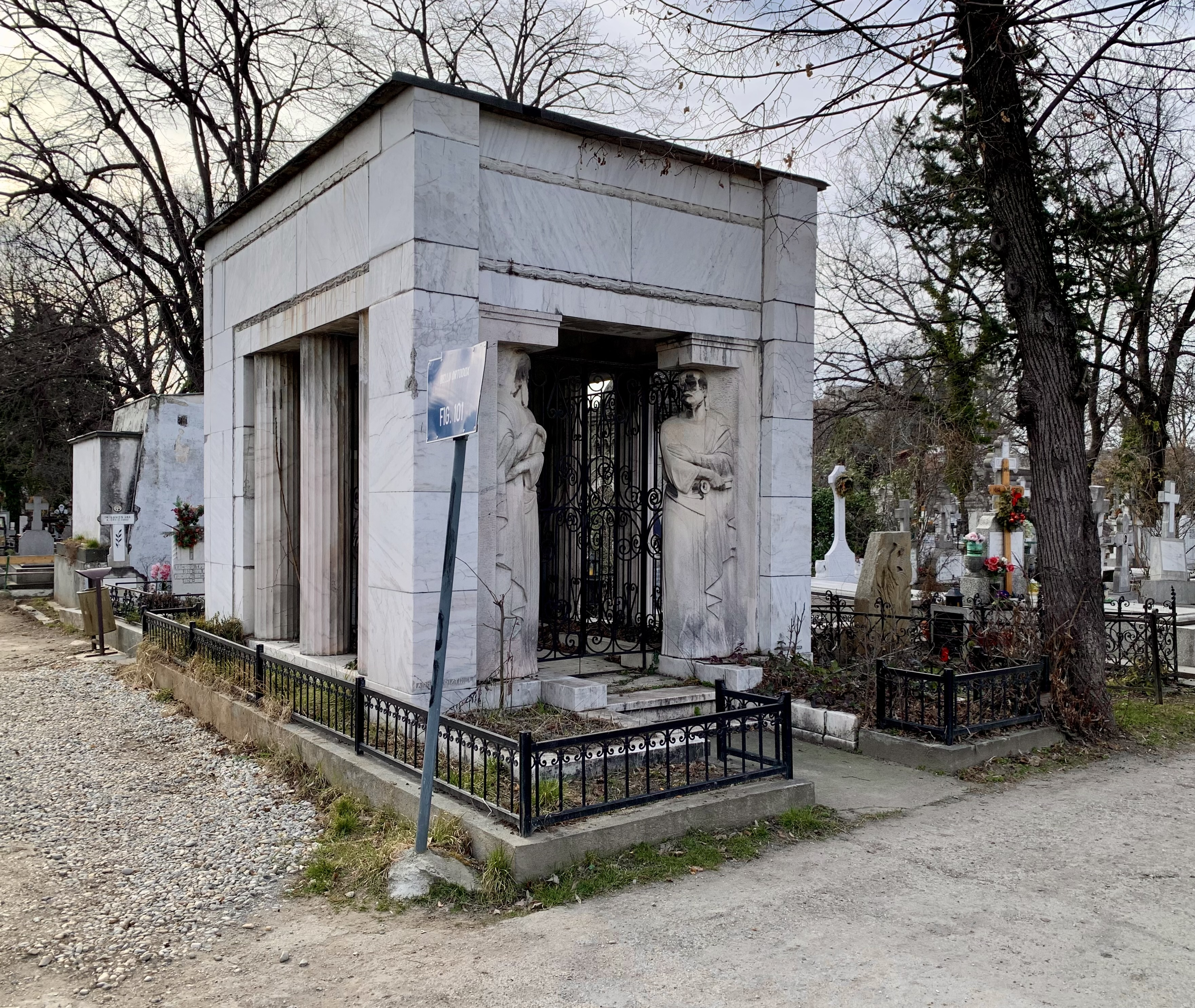
Mature - Grave of the Străjescu Family, Bellu Cemetery, Bucharest, by George Cristinel, 1934

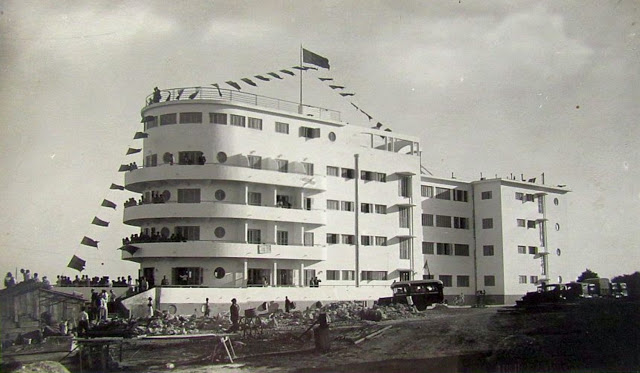
Streamline Moderne - Bellona Hotel, Eforie, by George Matei Cantacuzino, 1934–1940

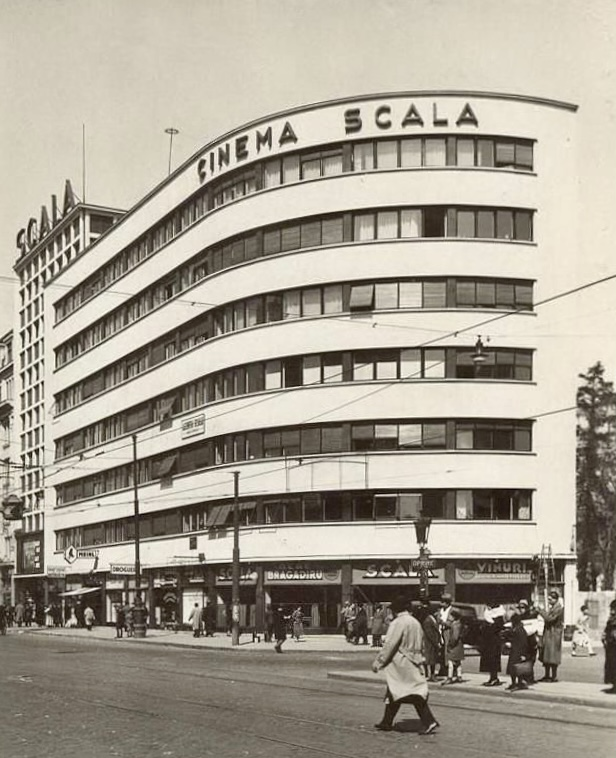
Streamline Moderne - Scala Cinema (Bulevardul Gheorghe Magheru no. 2), Bucharest, by Rudolf Fränkel, 1935

Art Deco was a type of modernism which appeared in France around 1910, as a style of luxury and modernity, highly associated with the Roaring 20s. It was present in Romania during the entire interwar period, creating a "luxurious and exuberant architecture, representative for the capitalist success", according to Ana Maria Zahariade. This style was used for administrative buildings, small apartment blocks of a few levels, and urban villas.

The movement had three phases: early, mature and late. The buildings of the 1920s and early 1930s are compositionally and stylistically similar to the Beaux-Arts ones from the 1900s and 1910s, but highly stylized and with a refined geometry. Pilasters and other Classical elements are used during this decade, but geometrized, together with simple floral motifs and abstract ornaments. An example of early Art Deco is the Central Social Insurance Company Building (now the Asirom Building) on Bulevardul Carol I, Bucharest, by Ion Ionescu, 1930s. Mature Art Deco, highly associated with the 1930s, was more modern and exuberant compared to the early form. Stepped setbacks are a key feature of this period. An example of mature Art Deco is Bulevardul Dacia no. 66, Bucharest, by Jean Monda, 1930s. Late Art Deco, from the late 1930s and the 1940s, paves the way for the International Style, but without completely abandoning ornamentation. Facades with 90° angle corners and decorated minimally only with simple cornices or each level are key features of this phase. However, this doesn't mean that these buildings are banal or dull. Materials of bright colours were used inside, especially marble and granite, and the exteriors usually had lightning rods. An example of late Art Deco is Piața Sfântul Ștefan no. 1, Bucharest, unknown architect, 1930s. At the same time, Streamline Moderne (Romanian: modernism pachebot) becomes popular in Romania, characterized by rounded corners and overall dynamism. An example of Romanian Streamline Moderne is the Moscovici Building (Strada Nicolae Iorga no. 22), Bucharest, by Aurel Focșanu and Emil Vițeanu, 1930s. Regardless of phase, Romanian Art Deco architecture is characterized by quality and more or less elegance through simplicity. Planned obsolescence is completely absent here.

Some of the best surviving examples of Art Deco are cinemas built in the 1920s and 1930s. The Art Deco period coincided with the conversion of silent films to sound, and movie companies built large display destinations in major cities to capture the huge audience that came to see movies. In Bucharest, the Regina Elisabeta Boulevard becomes a genuine film avenue, with its seven Art Deco cinemas. Soon, more movie theatres are built on the Gheroghe Magheru and Nicolae Bălcescu Boulevards and on Calea Victoriei in Bucharest. Besides cinemas, Romanian Art Deco also manifested through hotels, like Union (Strada Ion Câmpineanu no. 11, by Arghir Culina, 1929–1931), described as "the most beautiful and elegant hotel in the country". A real estate boom happens in the 1930s, when many small apartment blocks of a few stories are erected. Besides buildings, Art Deco monuments also appear, like the Monument to the Heroes of the Air on Bulevardul Aviatorilor, or the Zodiac Fountain at the main entrance of the Carol Park, both in Bucharest.

==== Late Art Deco ====
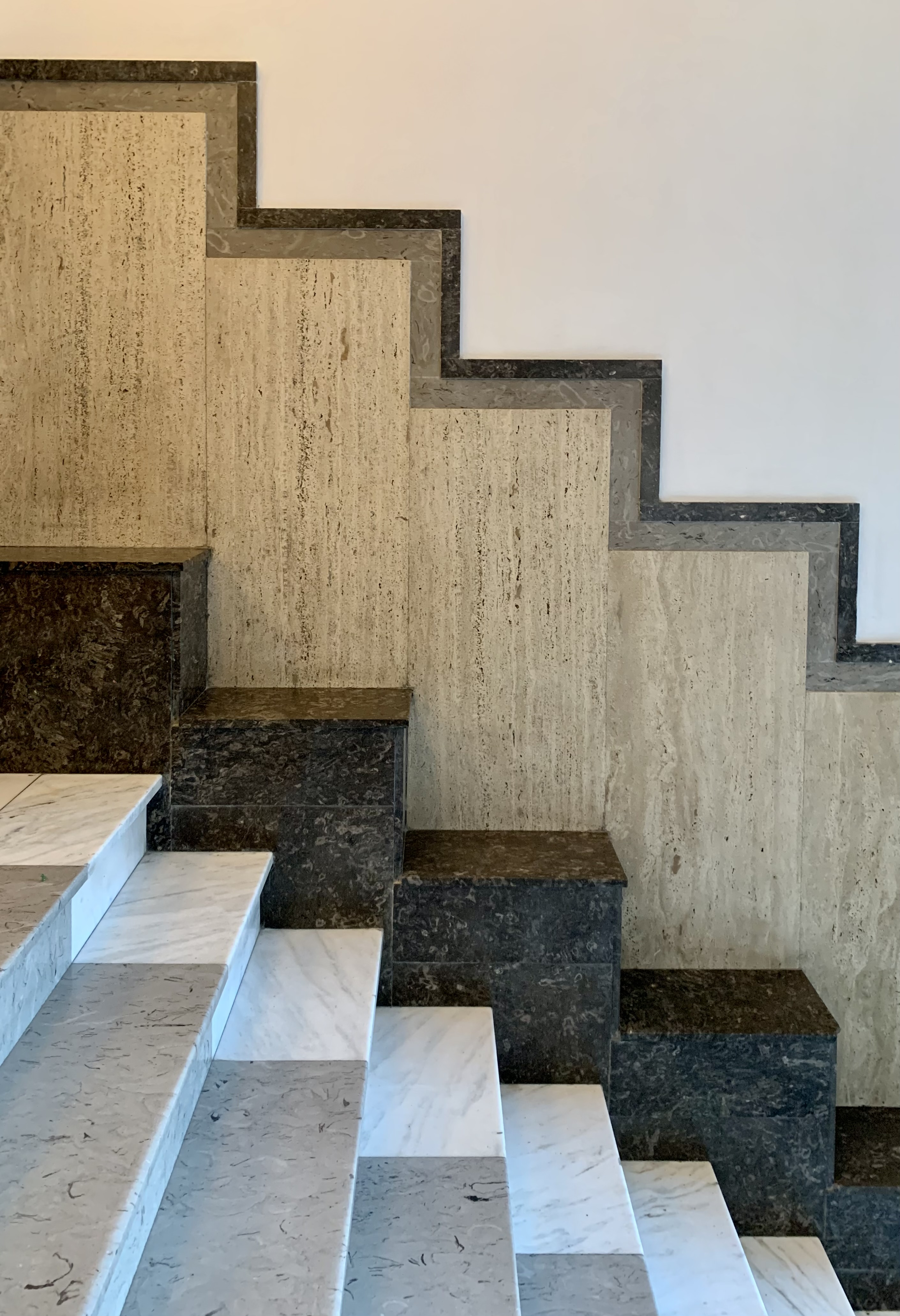
Polychrome marble facing in the entrance hall of Strada Pitar Moș no. 27–29, Bucharest, by Sady Herivan, 1931-1933

Popper Sanatorium, Predeal, by Marcel Iancu, 1934

Strada C.A. Rosetti no. 43, Bucharest, by Marcel Locar, 1934

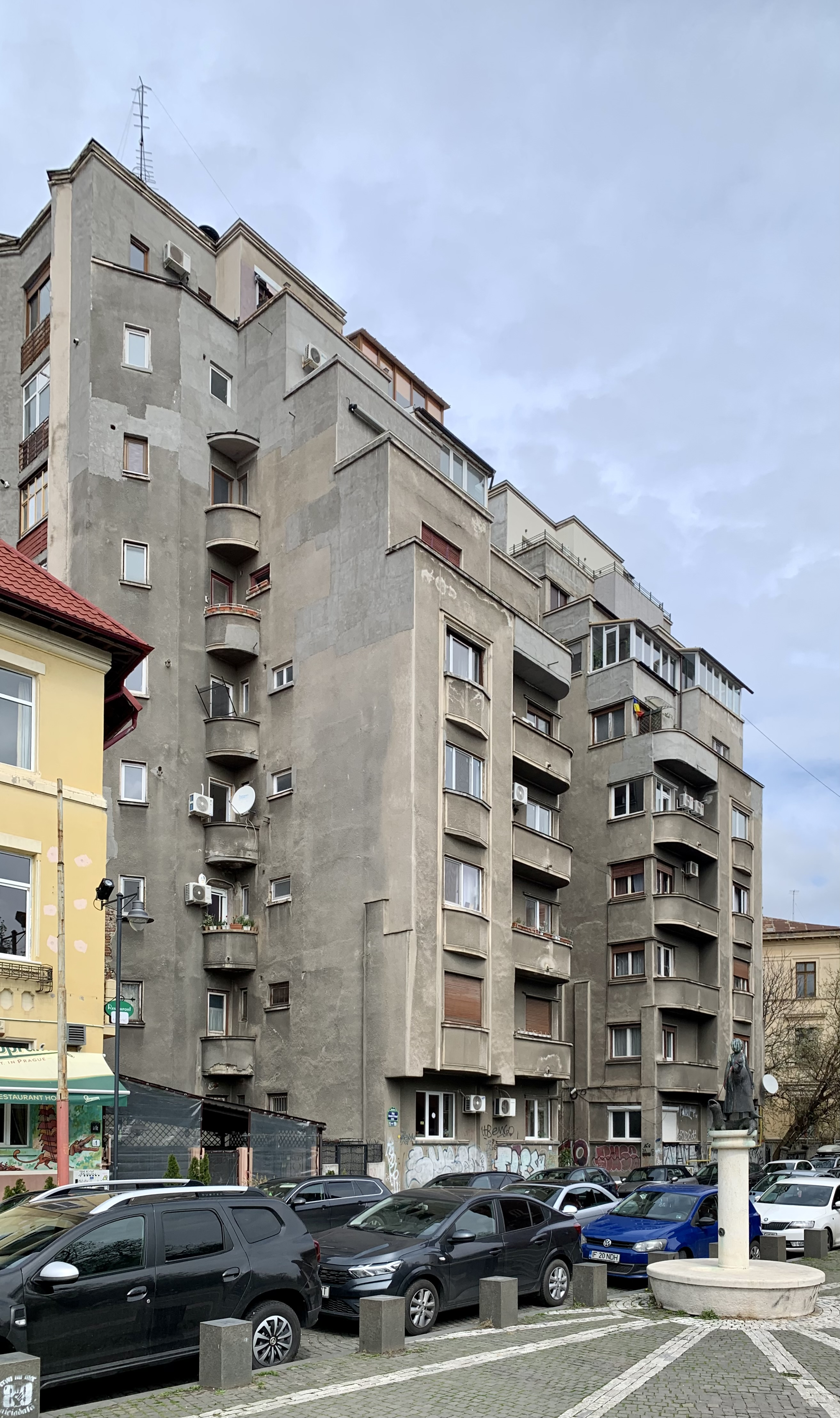
Strada Alexandru D. Xenopol no. 3, Bucharest, by Ion I. Berindey, 1935-1936

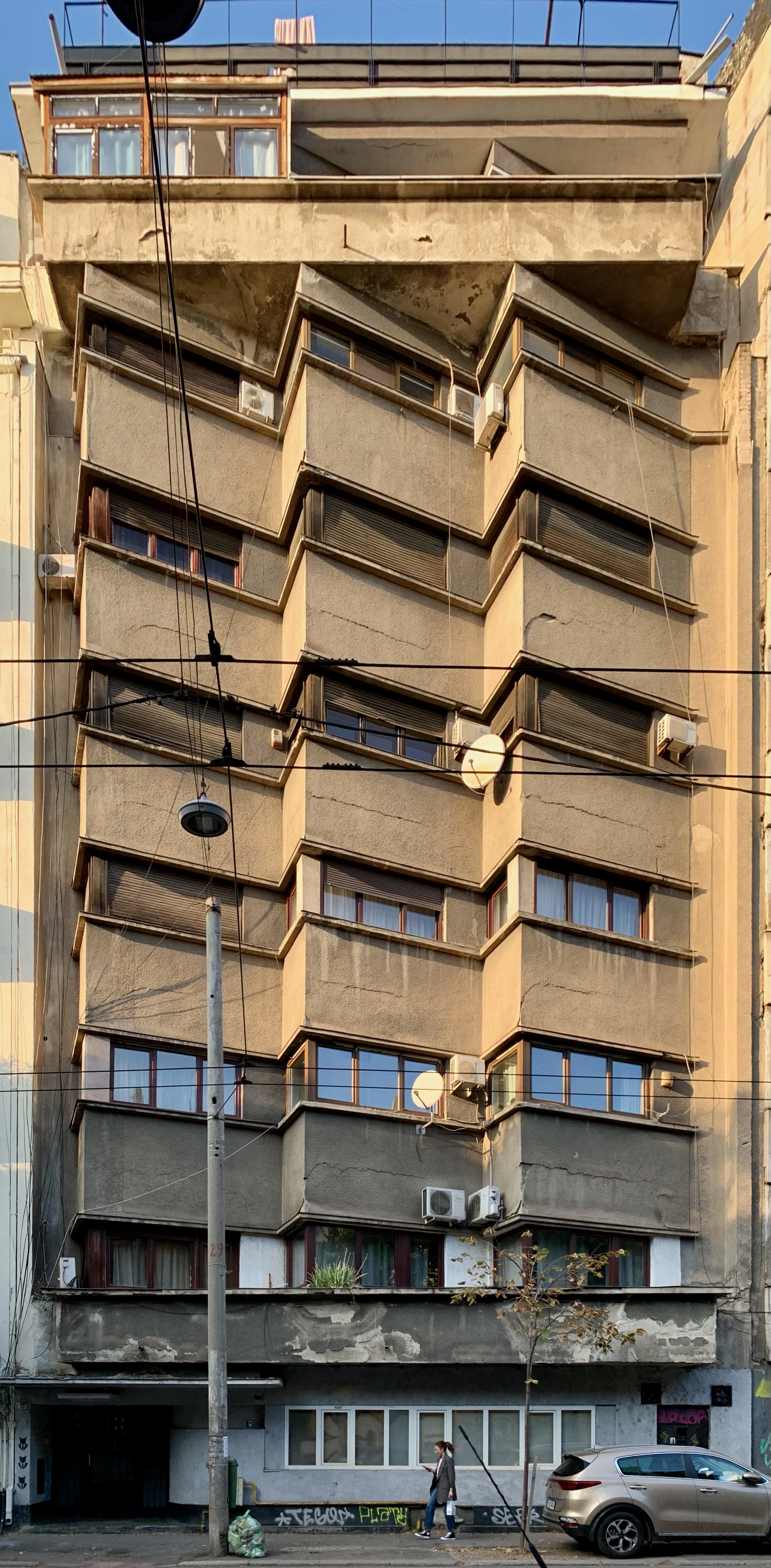
Bulevardul Dacia no. 53, Bucharest, unknown architect, 1936

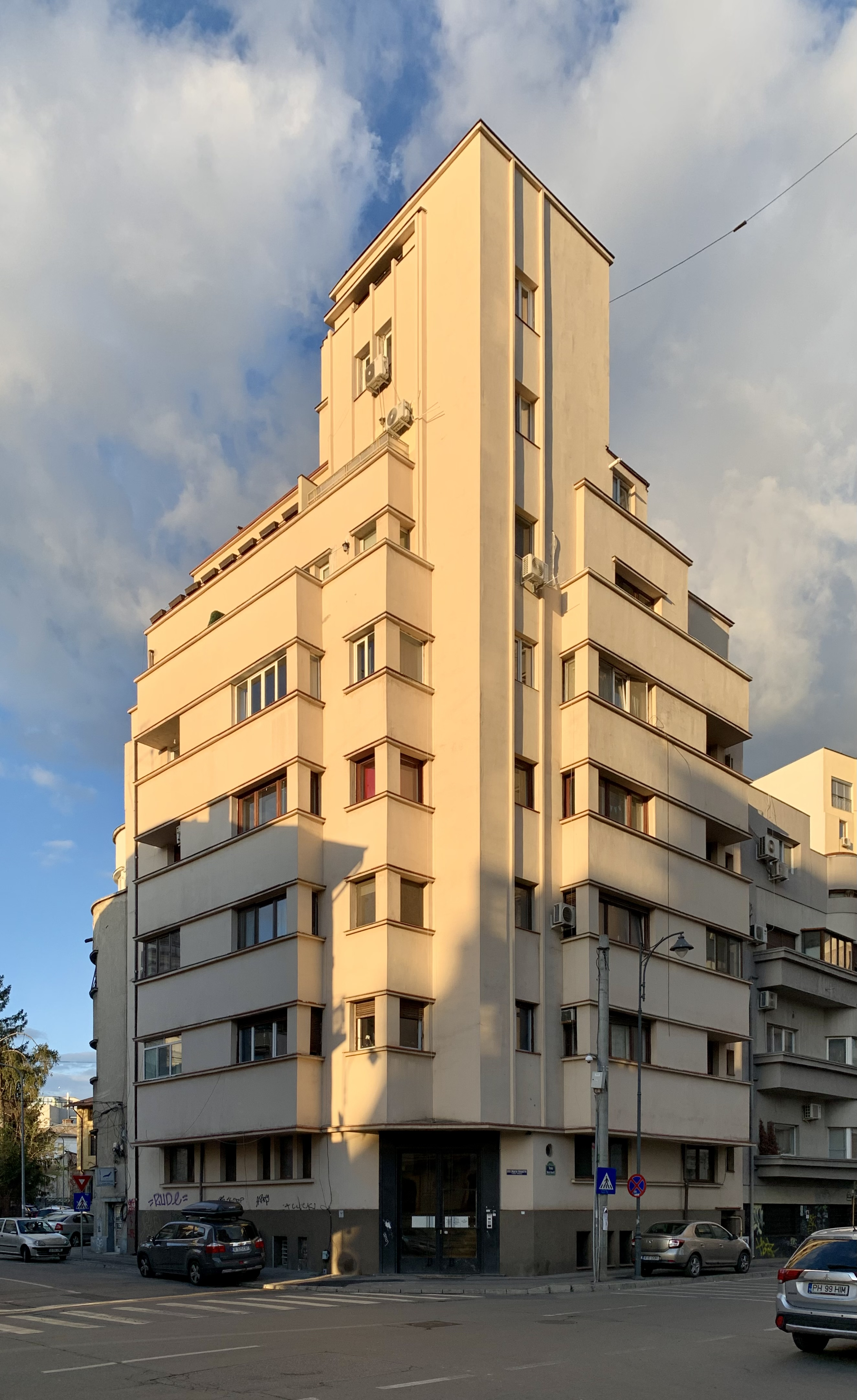
Strada Maria Rosetti no. 55, Bucharest, unknown architect, c.1940

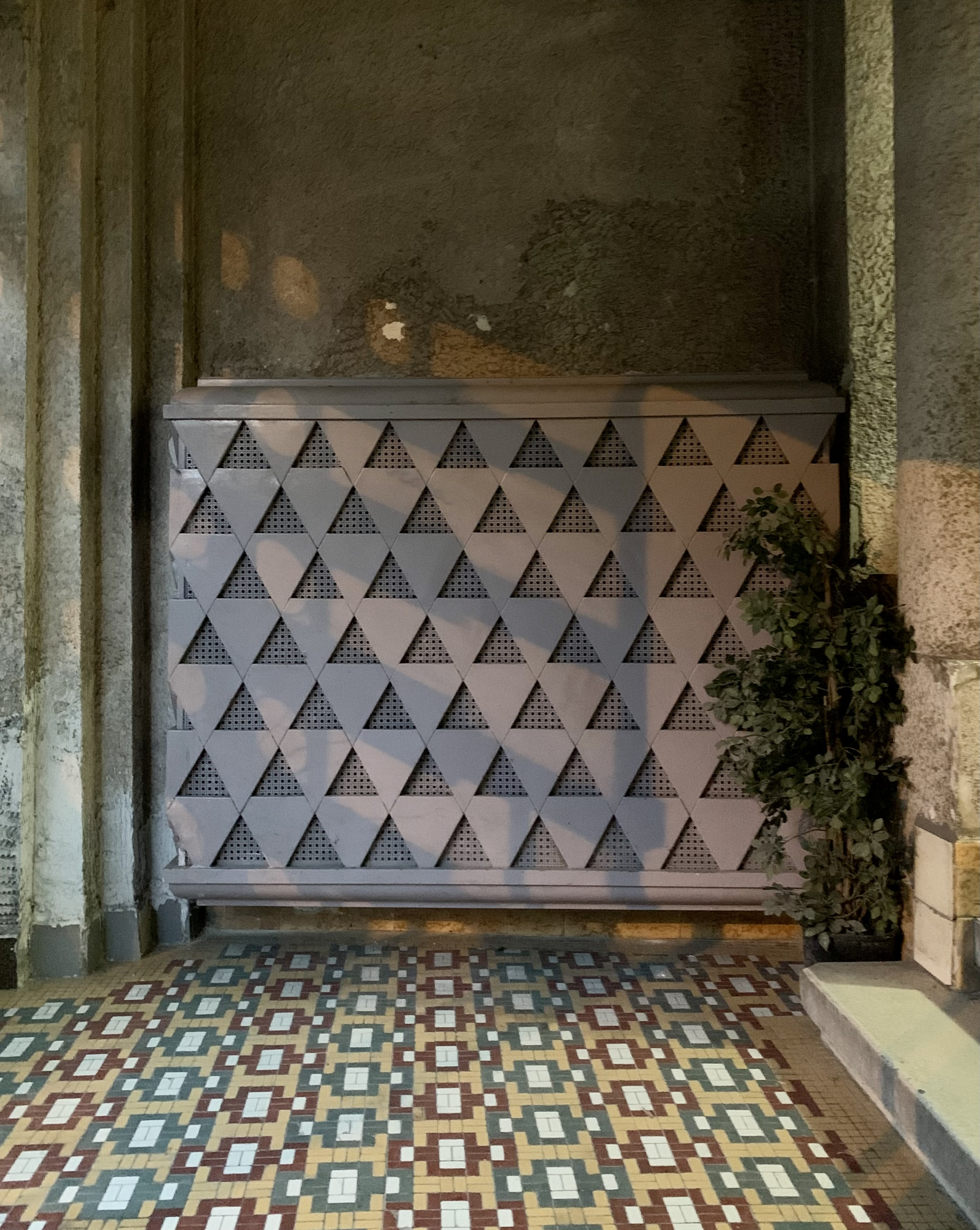
Radiator mask and polychrome mosaic floor in Strada C.A. Rosetti no. 55, Bucharest, unknown architect, c.1940

Obor Covered Market Hall, Bucharest, 1937–1942: by Horia Creangă and Haralamb Georgescu, 1942–1946: by Haralamb Georgescu

During the 1930s and 1940s, Bauhaus Modernist ideas appear in Romanian architecture under the form of late Art Deco, very popular among young architects and the progressive bourgeoisie. Reinforced concrete apartment blocks and houses were built, made up of basic shapes, with horizontal or corner windows, usually with no symmetry. A typology of apartment blocks are the symmetrical U-shaped ones with courtyards. Important architects that built without decorating their buildings, similar to the International Style, include Horia Creangă, Duiliu Marcu, Octav Doicescu and Grigore Ionescu. Chronologically, the first architect that adopted without restraints Modernism was Marcel Iancu, who also designed some Cubist villas.

When Modernism entered the mainstream in the interwar period, the conservatives were initially horrified by the basic shapes, the simple lines, the lack of ornamentation and the austere look of the new buildings. Horia Creangă, the creator of some of the most iconic interwar Modernist buildings was nicknamed the "aristocrat of simple lines". Marcel Iancu wrote the reaction of some people towards the Fuchs Villa, the first Modernist house in Bucharest:

The neighbours don't understand why, instead of the old windows, the new house has a window that goes from an edge of the wall to another, like a mortuary display case. The attic eye, usually on the roof, is here in three examples, like some first class cabins of a transatlantic ship, and the garage seems to be the subsidiary of the central crematorium.

The 1930s represented a key decade of transformation of Bucharest. The period of popularity of Bauhaus Modernism intersects with intense modernizations of Bucharest from the interwar period, thus certain areas having a high density of tall Modernist buildings. Some good examples of this are the Gheorghe Magheru Boulevard and some parts of Calea Victoriei in Bucharest.

During World War II, architectural activity was very low. Some buildings that were started before the war, like the Victoria Palace in Bucharest, continued being built also during the war.

=== Moorish ===
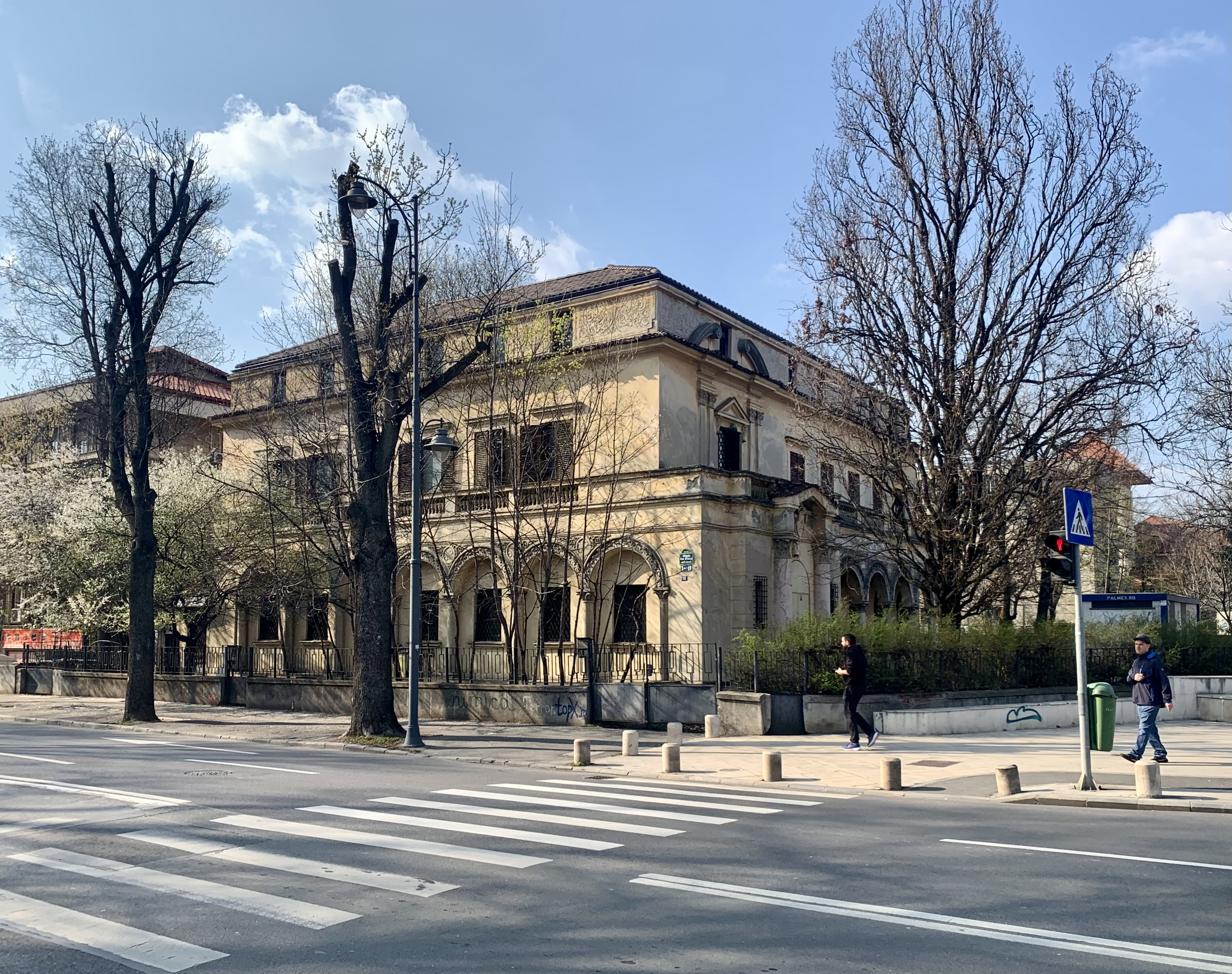
Adina Olmazu Woroniecka House, nicknamed the 'little palazzo' (Strada Ion Mincu no. 19), Bucharest, by Alexandru Zaharia, 1929-1930

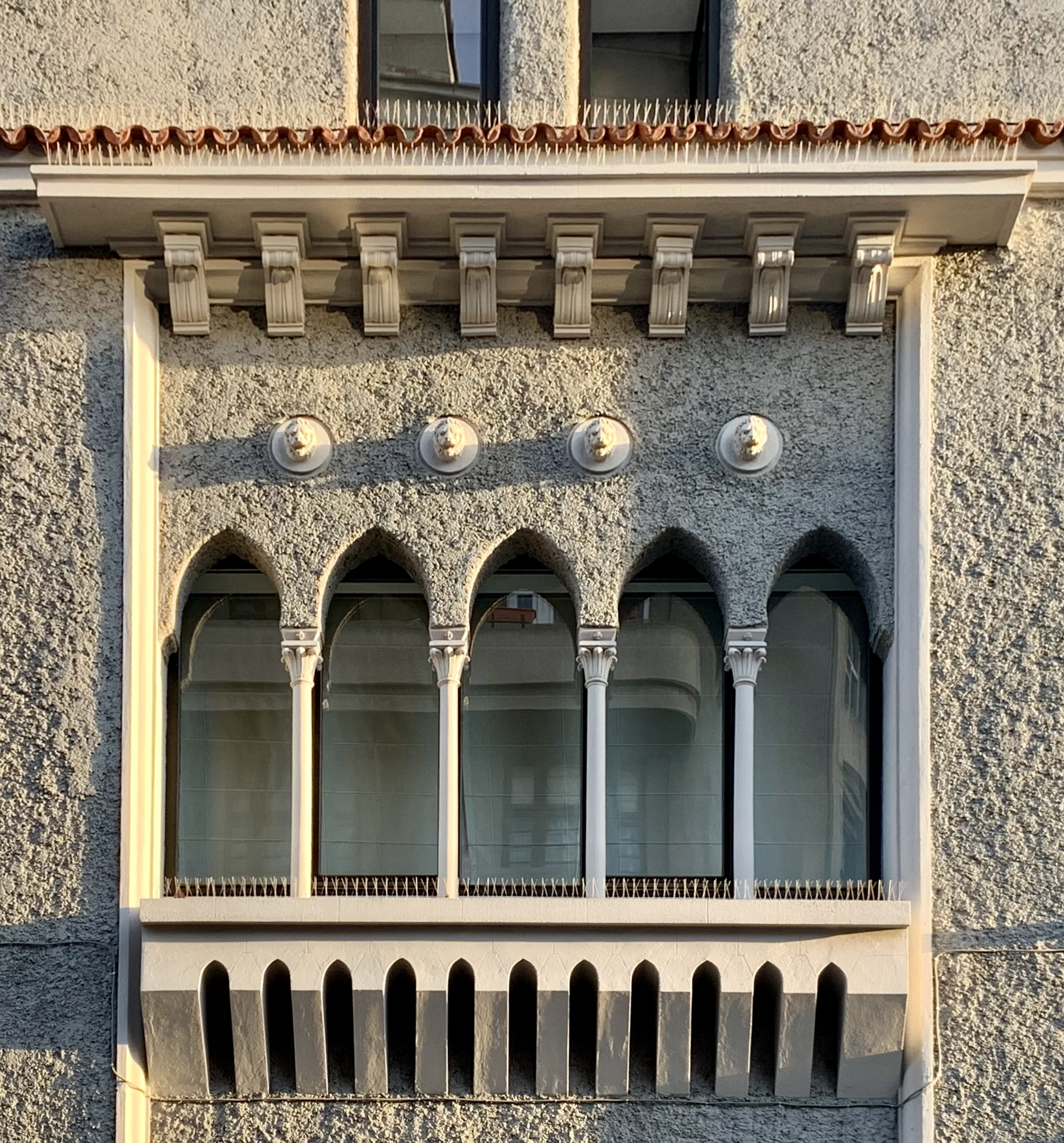
Window of Strada George Enescu no. 14, Bucharest, unknown architect, c.1930

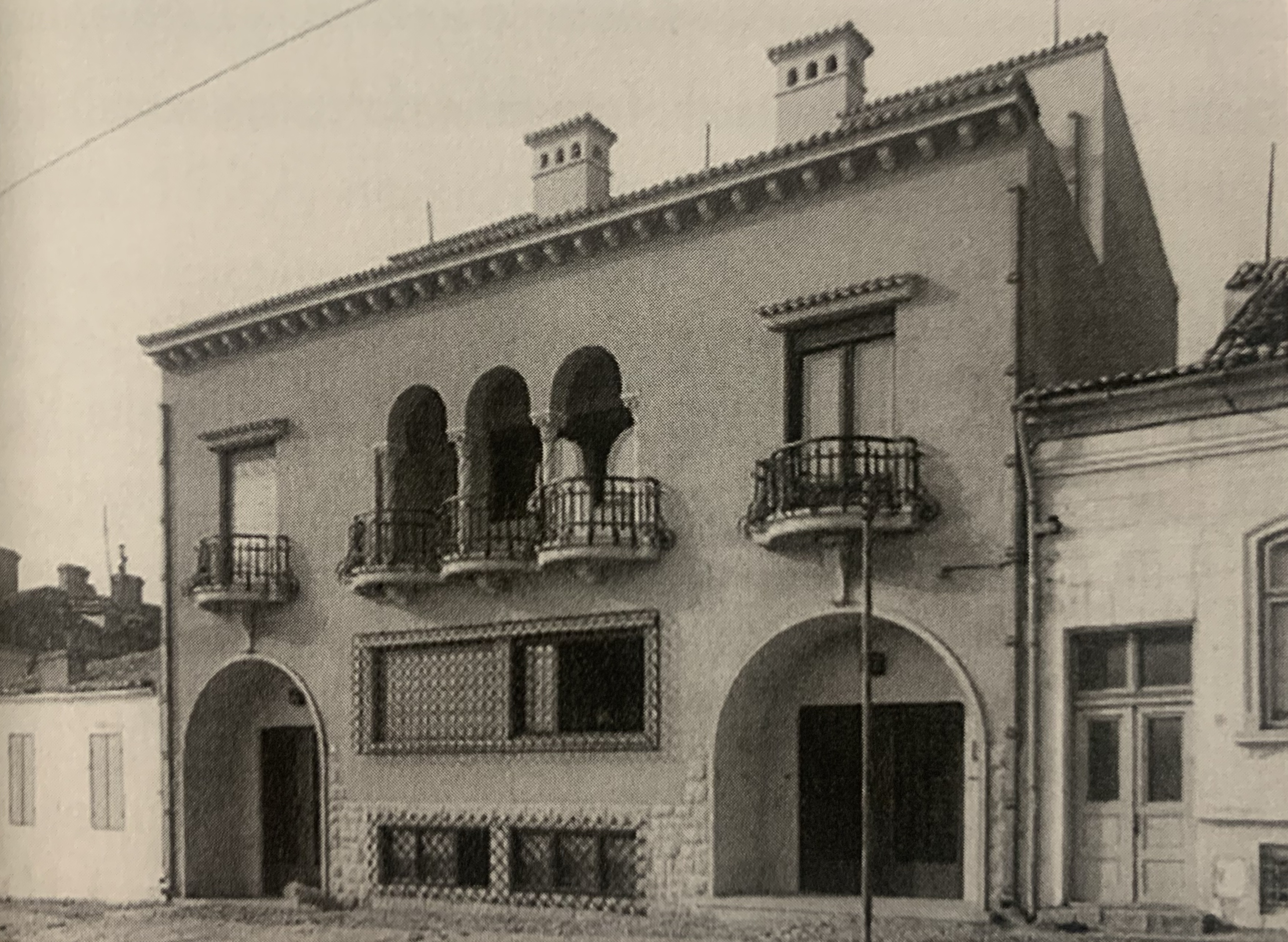
Leon Vlodinger House (Strada Mircea cel Bătrân no. 43), Constanța, by Horia Maicu, 1935

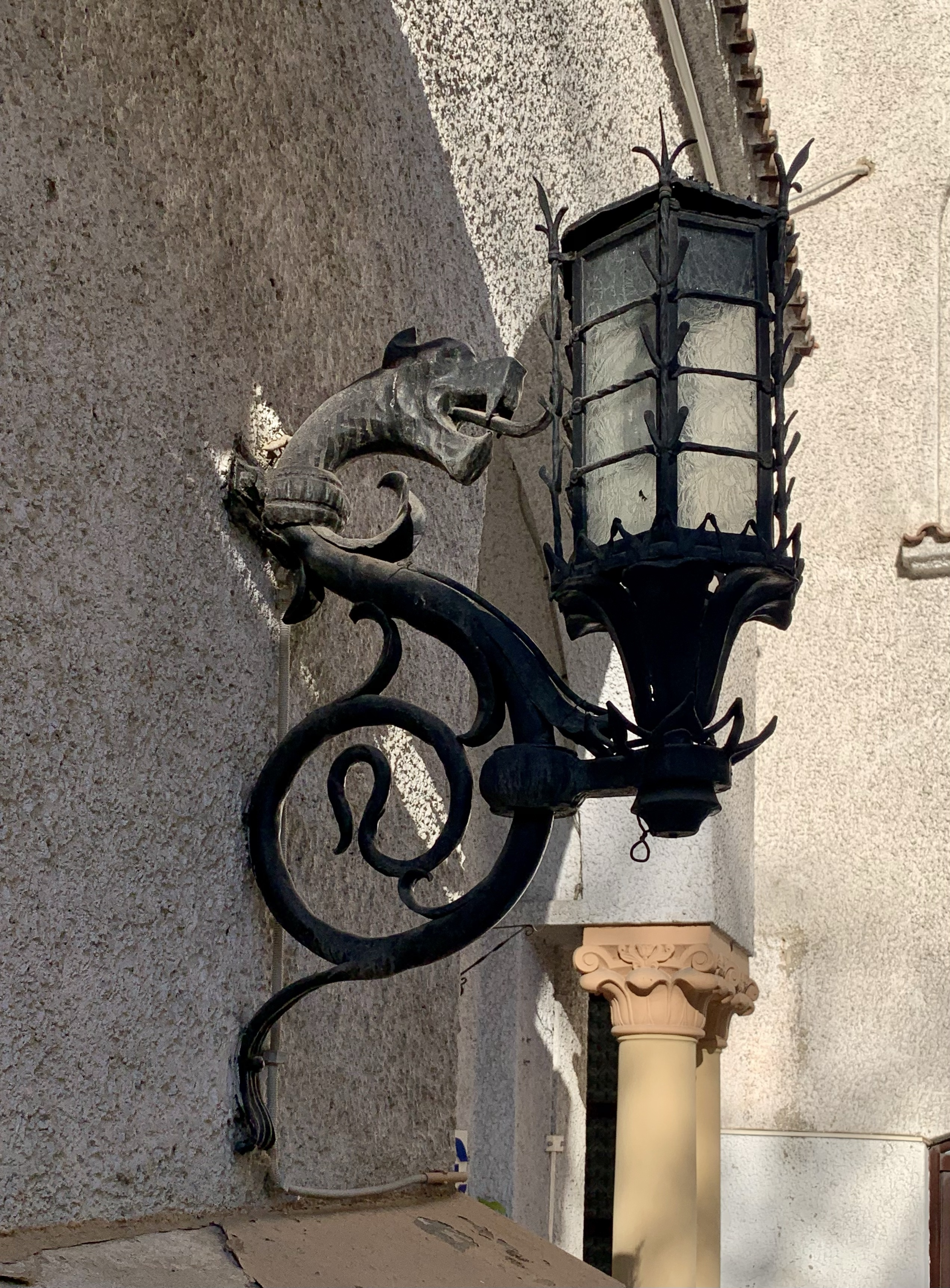
Wrought iron lantern of the Richard Franasovici House (Strada Pitar Moș no. 20), Bucharest, by Alexandru Zaharia, 1936

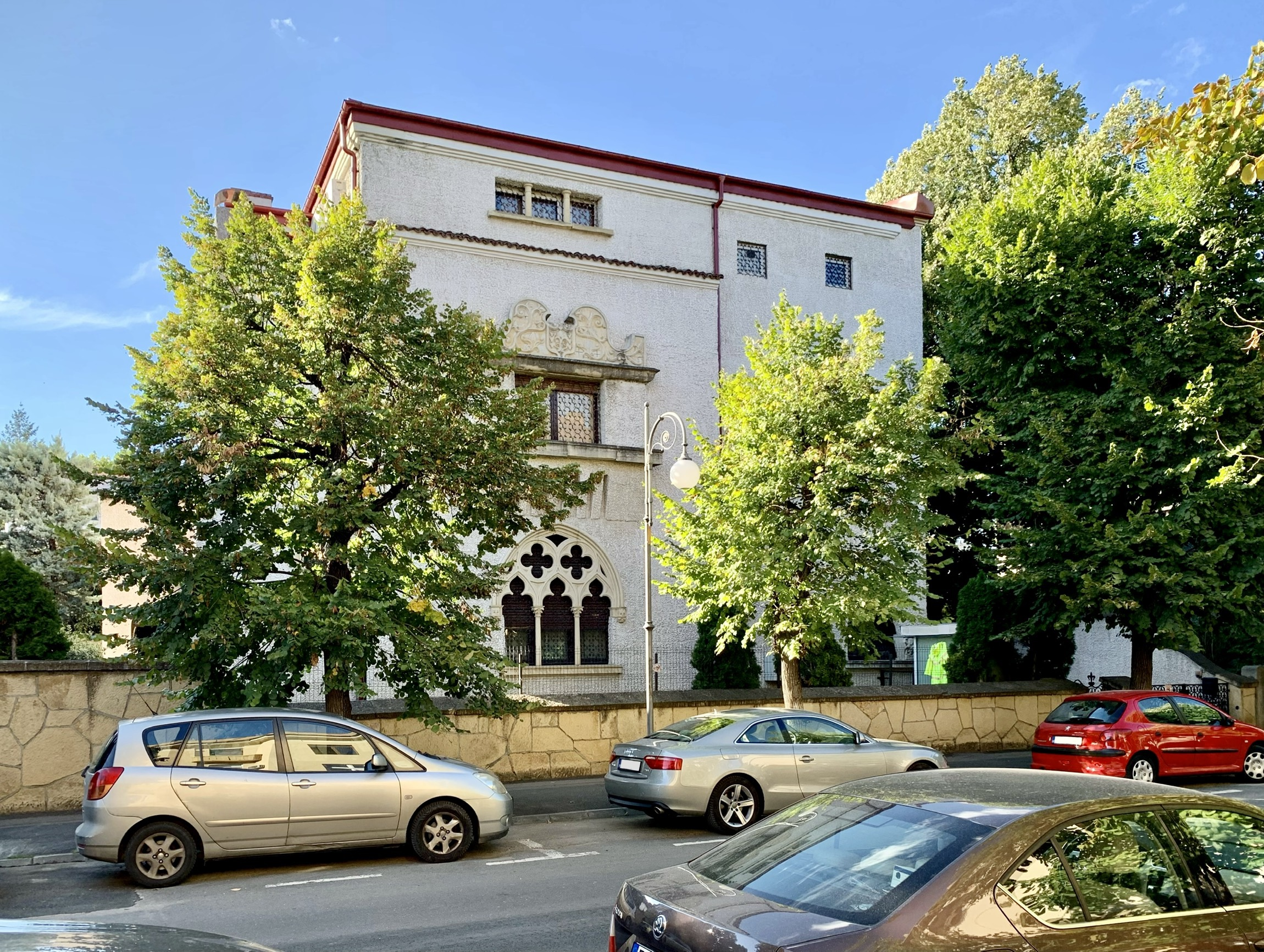
Carol Gagel House (Strada Doctor Lister no. 32), Bucharest, by Anton Curagea and Ion Giurgea, 1937

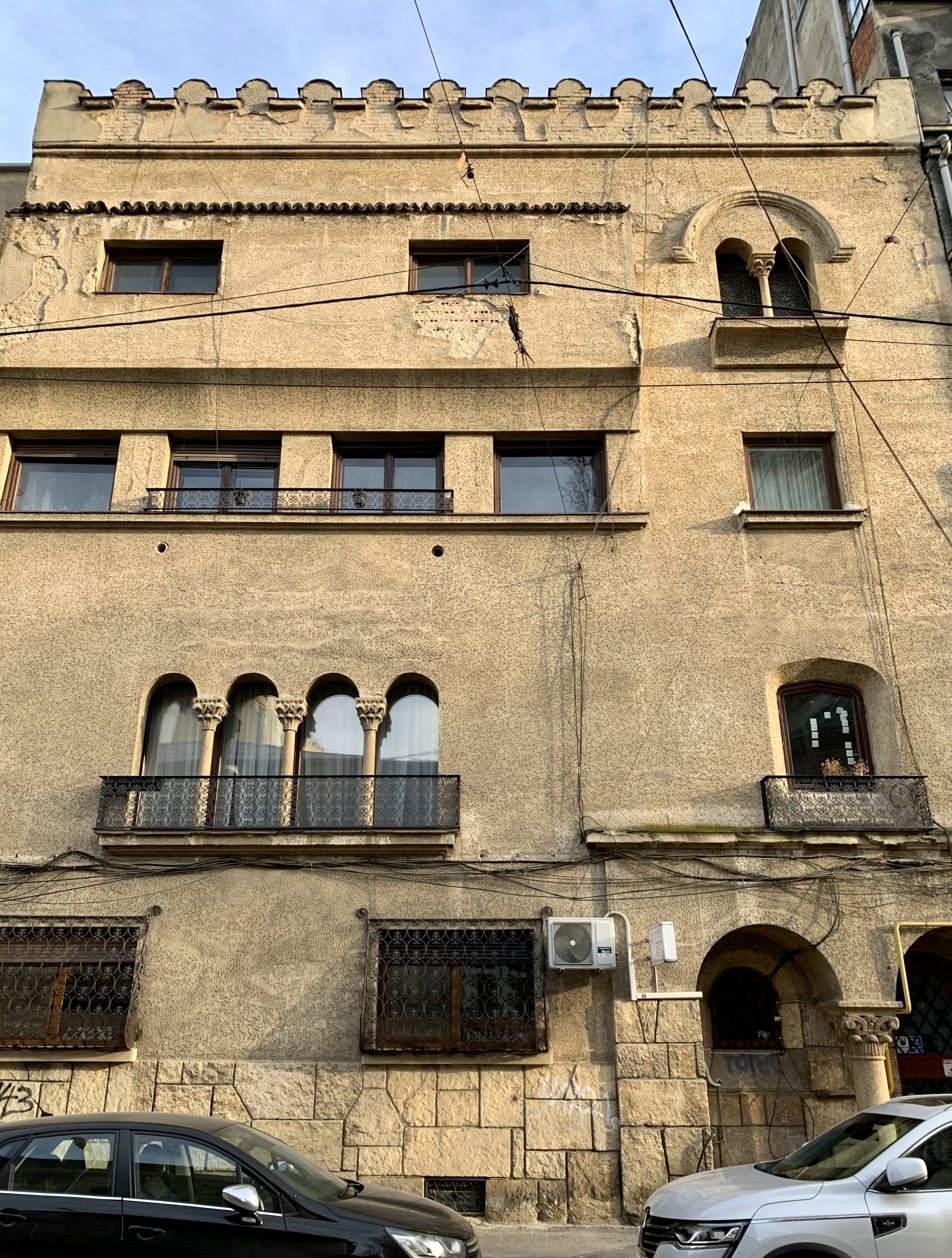
General Mandiros Ciomac and Simion Ciomac Building (Strada Armenească no. 12), Bucharest, by Ion Giurgea, 1938

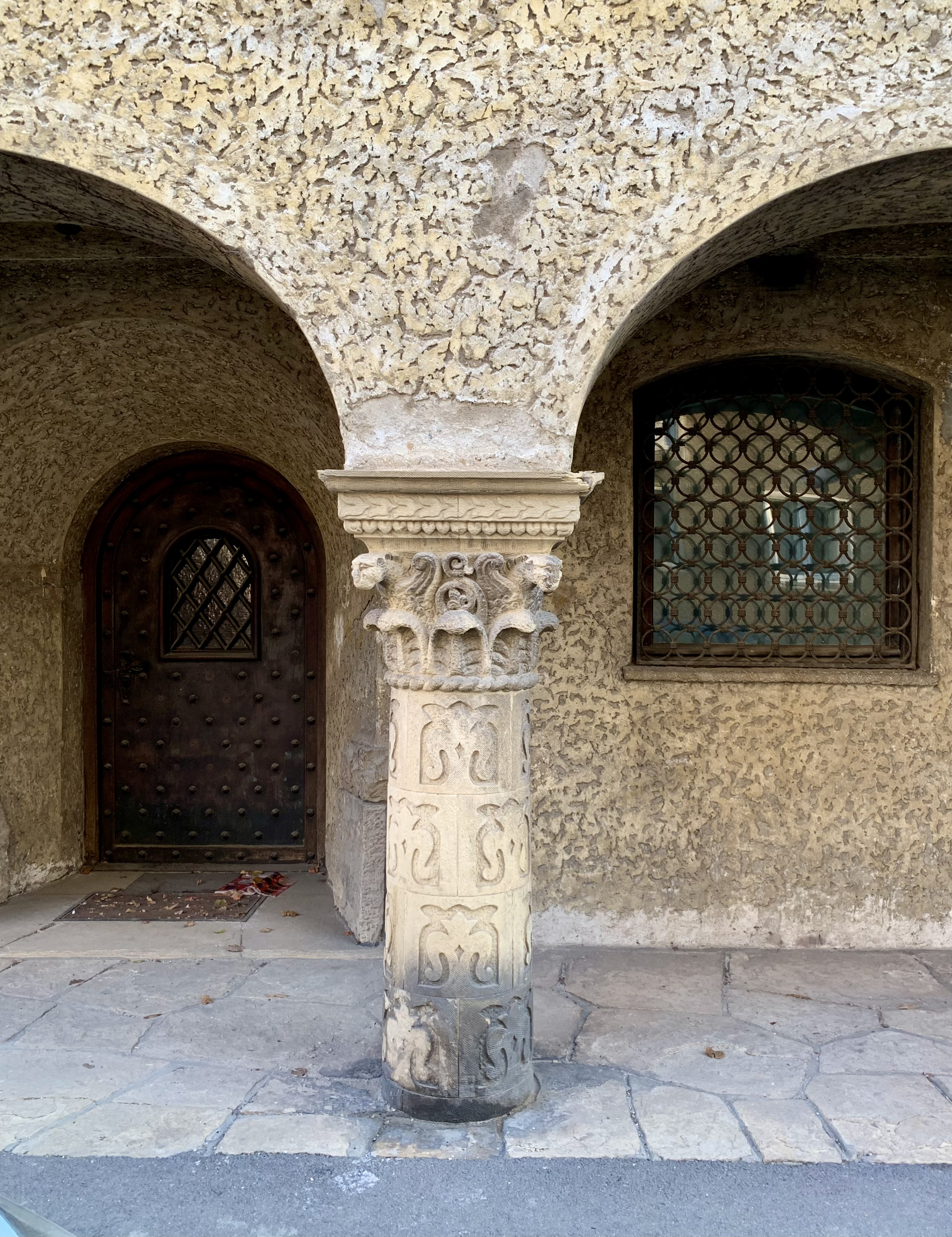
Column of the Ion Giurgea House (Strada Frumoasă no. 26A), Bucharest, by Ion Giurgea, 1940

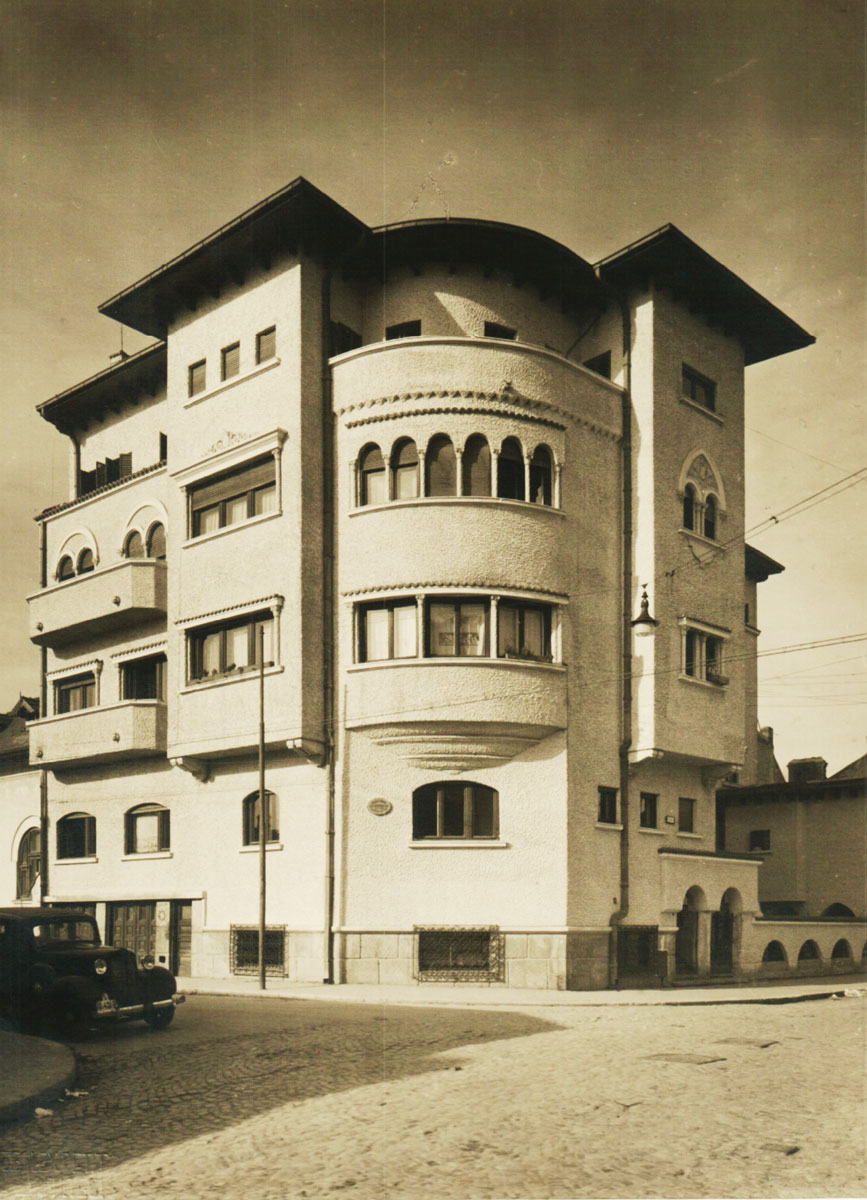
Elena Florescu Building (Strada Popa Nan no. 32), Bucharest, by George Damian, 1943

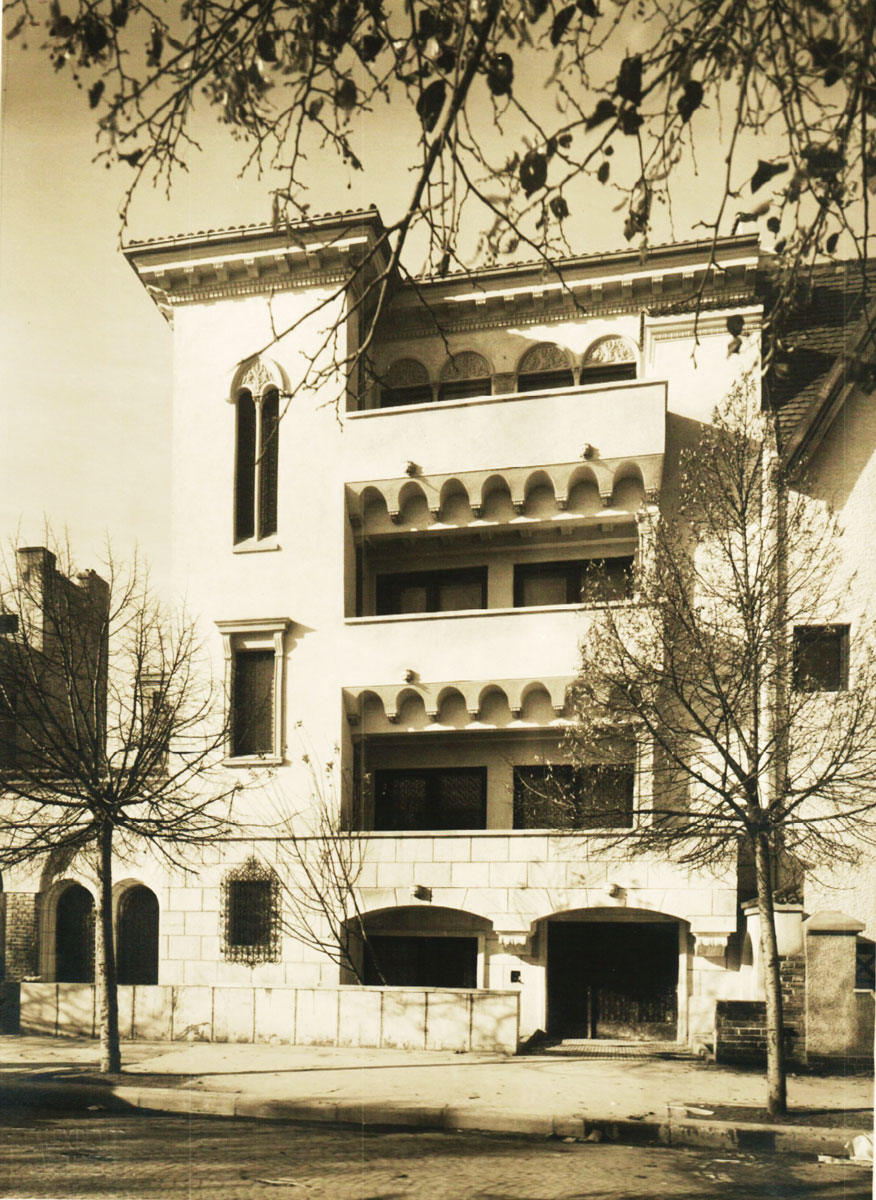
Ionescu House (Bulevardul Aviatorilor no. 53), Bucharest, by George Damian, 1945

Strada Dionisie Lupu no 74, Bucharest, by George Damian, 1947

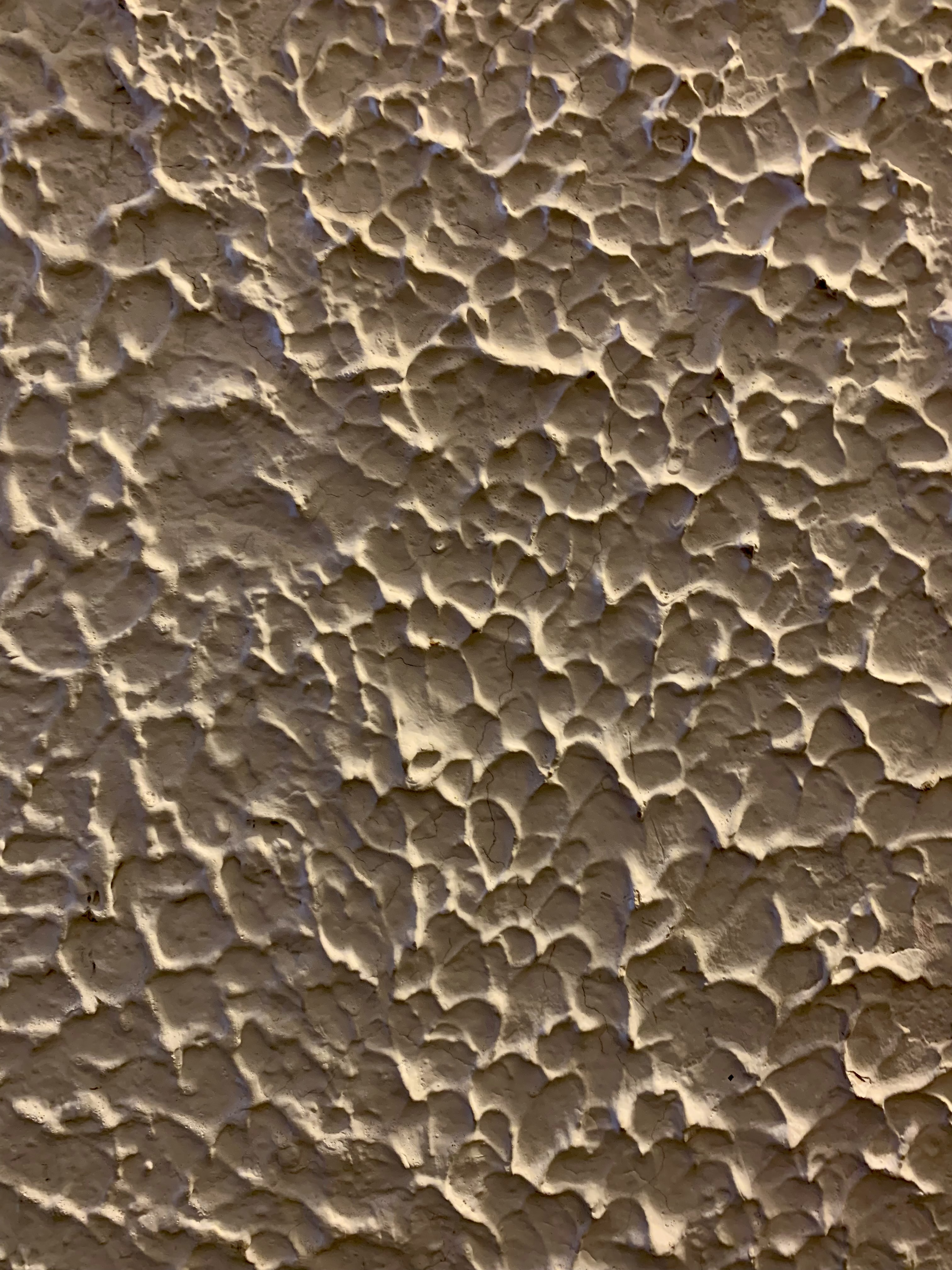
Calcio-vecchio plaster on a wall inside Strada Dionisie Lupu no. 74, Bucharest, by George Damian, 1947

A key style of the 1930s was the Moorish (Romanian: stilul Maur), aka Moorish-Florentine (Romanian: stilul mauro-florentin) or Mediterranean Picturesque (Romanian: stilul pitoresc mediteranean), which eclectically uses Romanesque, Gothic and Renaissance elements in civic architecture, with a Mediterranean vibe. It is also defined by big plane surfaces on the facades, with coarser or finer calcio-vecchio plaster textures. These abrasive plaster facades have proven over time to be durable. Another characteristic is simplicity, its ornamentation usually standing in window frames, doors and columns. Pantile was used for roofs and window cornices, both for decorative and practical reasons. These covering tiles are an important feature that gives buildings a Mediterranean air. Another important element of the style were loggias, with slender columns and simple of ogive arches. Wooden pergolas sometimes appeared, being usually added only for decorative reasons. Houses tend to have small ogive or arch windows and big rooms, giving them a mystical and mysterious vibe. Exteriors can look like fortresses or small castles. They also have big monumental fireplaces, similar to the ones in Hogwarts from the Harry Potter series. Interiors usually had Renaissance or Louis XIII style furniture which matches with the style of the home. Most Moorish buildings are urban villas, apartment buildings being somewhat rare.

The style is a local version of Spanish Colonial Revival and Mediterranean Revival architecture, popular in the first half of the 20th century in Coastal California and Florida. However, its origins and rise in Romania are not clear. One source could be Regionalist architecture of Mediterranean Europe. In Istoria Civilizației Românești: Perioada Interbelică (1918-1940) (The History of the Romanian Civilization: The Interwar Period (1918-1940)), the historian Ioan Scurtu stated that between the two World Wars, many Romanians came to the French Riviera. These vacations to the Mediterranean seaside (including the Greek one) may have contributed to the rise of the Mediterranean style in Romania. Another country which could have influenced architects who designed Moorish buildings is Italy. The cloister of the Monreale Cathedral in Monreale, Sicily, visited and drawn multiple times by Romanian architect George Simotta, is similar stilistically with 1930s Moorish architecture. Another origin of the style may have been Balchik, a Black Sea coastal town and seaside resort in the Southern Dobruja area of present-day northeastern Bulgaria. During the interwar period, it was part of Romania, and queen Marie of Romania started in 1925 the construction of a small summer palace. Later, writers like Jean Bart and Ion Pillat had residences in this area. Female architect Henrieta Delavrancea designed 20 villas here, in a style known as the "new Balchik" style.

Some architects rejected the style, like Constantin C. Moșchin, who criticizes its "decadence" in a 1935 article in the Arhitectura magazine. Another critical voice belonged to George Matei Cantacuzino, in an article entitled Mitocanul ca Factor al Civilizației Românești (The Lout as a Factor of Romanian Civilisation), published in the 1939 Simetria Magazine. There, he condemned the superficiality of a type client who was the product of a precarious education and research, who, "being informed only by the films he sees at the cinema, after exceedingly long meals and empty days, he would like his house to synthetise the décor of every romantic drama, where Mexican facades have Brâncovenesc elements, while Roman domes cover bathrooms and iconostases serve as bar tops for serving cocktails". During WW2, general Ion Antonescu, who had far-right and antisemitic views, disproves Moorish buildings, associating them with Jews. The end of WW2 is when the style truly disappears, with the rise of the Communist regime and Socialist realist architecture.

One of the most impressive examples of Moorish architecture is the Carol/Otto Gagel House on Strada Doctor Lister in Cotroceni, Bucharest, 1937, by Anton Curagea and Ion Giurgea, which shows its characteristics. Otto Gagel was the most famous bread and biscuit producer before WW1 and during the interwar period. He was also a provider of the Romanian Royal family, and had factories on the Arsenal Hill, which were demolished in the 1980s by the Nicolae Ceaușescu regime to make space for the Civic Centre.

=== The first "Blockhouses" ===
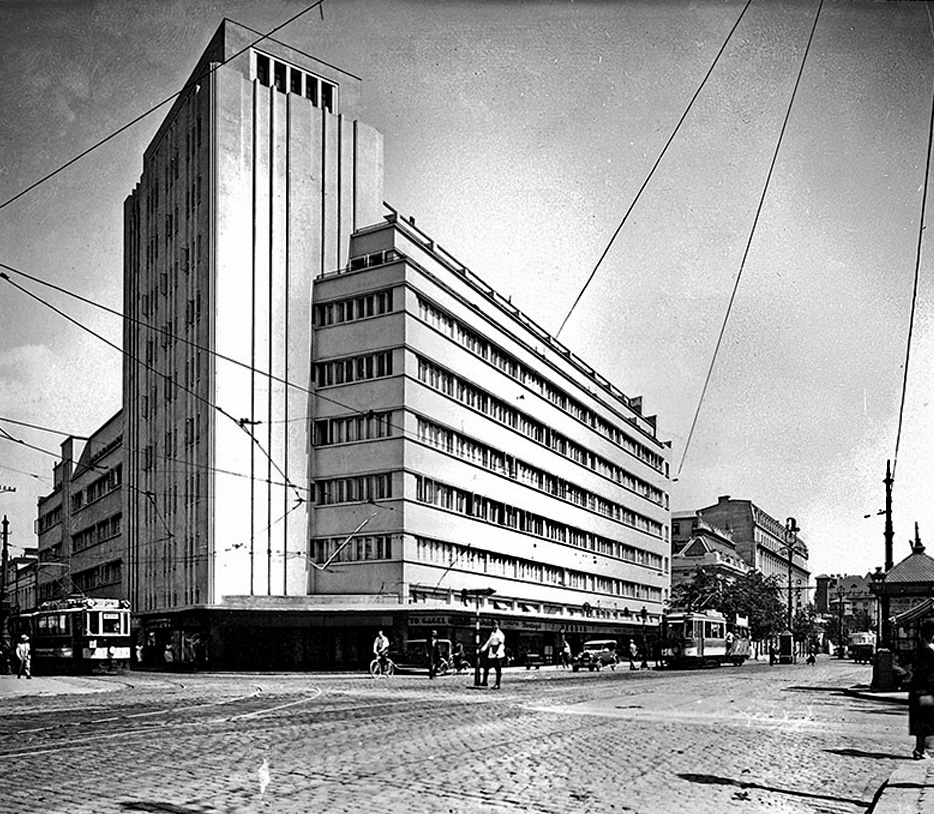
ARO Building, Bucharest, 1929–1931, by Horia Creangă et al.

"Gold" small apartment block, Bucharest, 1934–1936, by Marcel Iancu

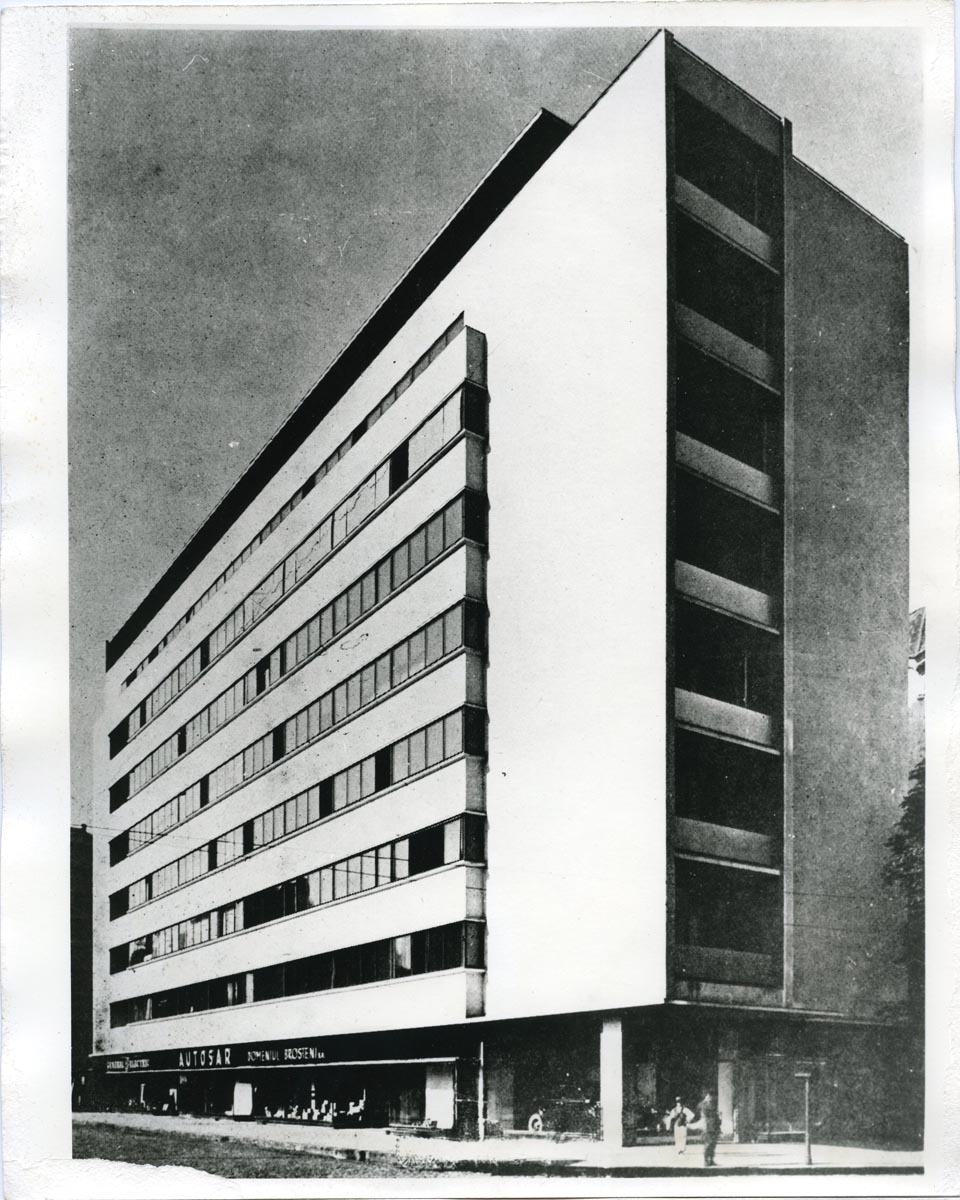
Malaxa-Burileanu Building, Bucharest, 1935–1937, by Horia Creangă

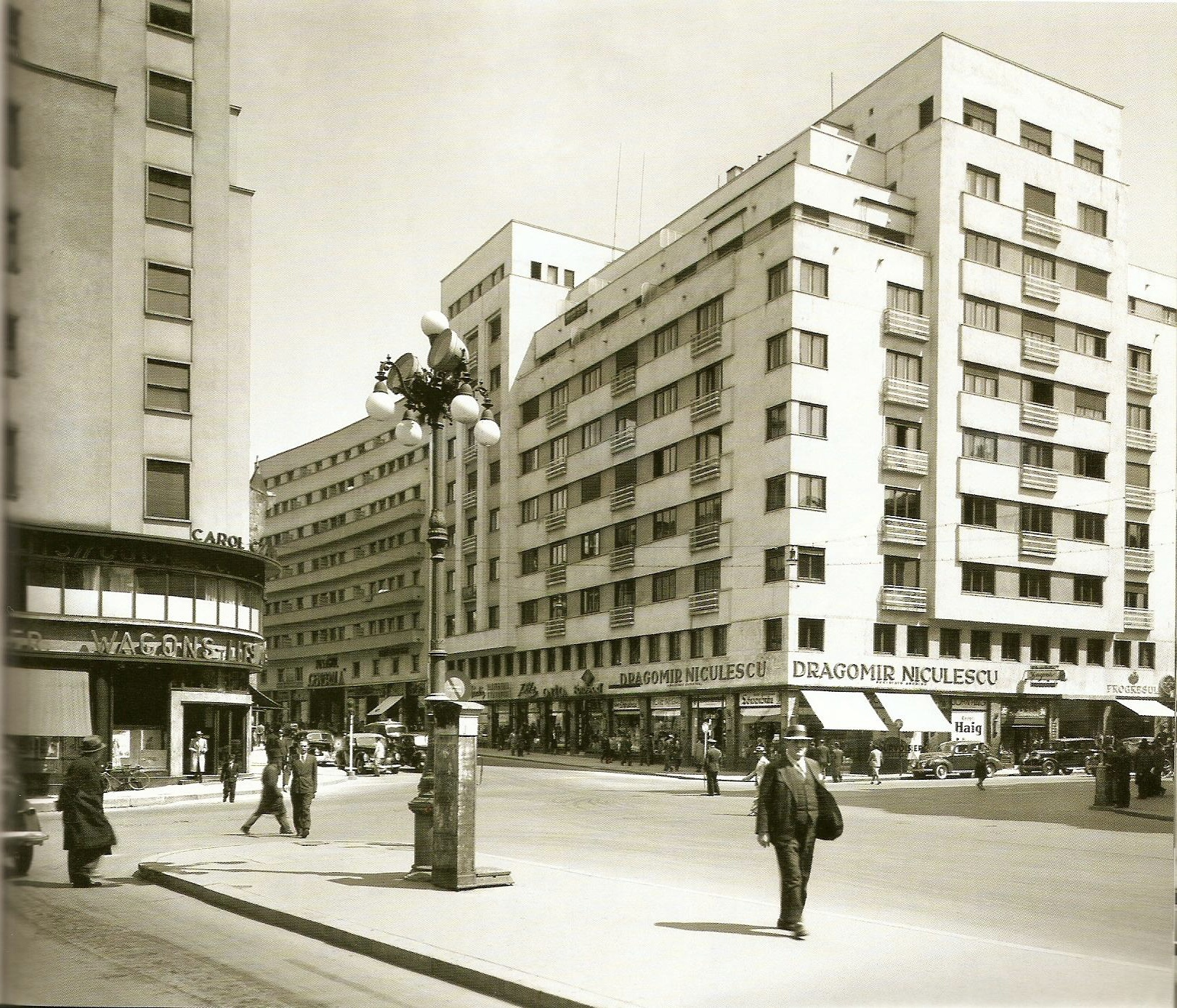
Dragomir-Niculescu Building on Calea Victoriei, Bucharest, 1936, by State Baloșin

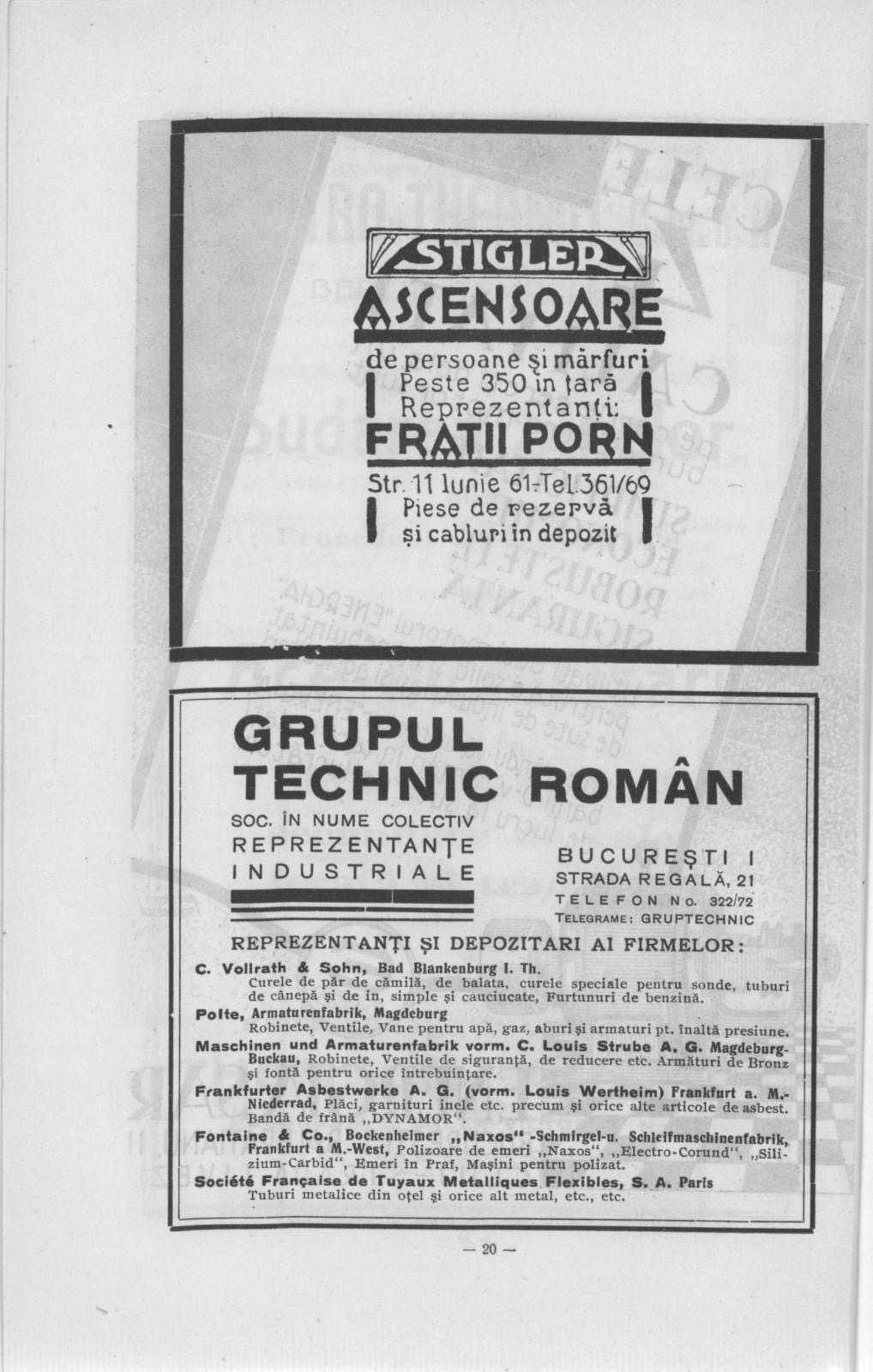
Page of a magazine or newspaper that advertised elevators

This term of American origin refers to the buildings with multiple levels, built during the 1920s and 1930s, in various parts of the central area of Bucharest. The buildings of the Nicolae Bălcescu Boulevard in Bucharest are mostly of this type, good examples of Romanian Modernism. Due to the fact that the seismic precautions of the intrwar period were not as good as the ones we have today, these blocks are dangerous when it comes to earthquakes. Because of this, today some of them have red circle stickers, known as bulina roșie (big red dot), highlighting the risk of crash.

== The Communist period (1948–1989) ==
=== Socialist realism (1947–mid 1950s) ===
Entrance of the Oil and Gas Institute Building on Calea Victoriei, Bucharest, by Duiliu Marcu, 1945-1946

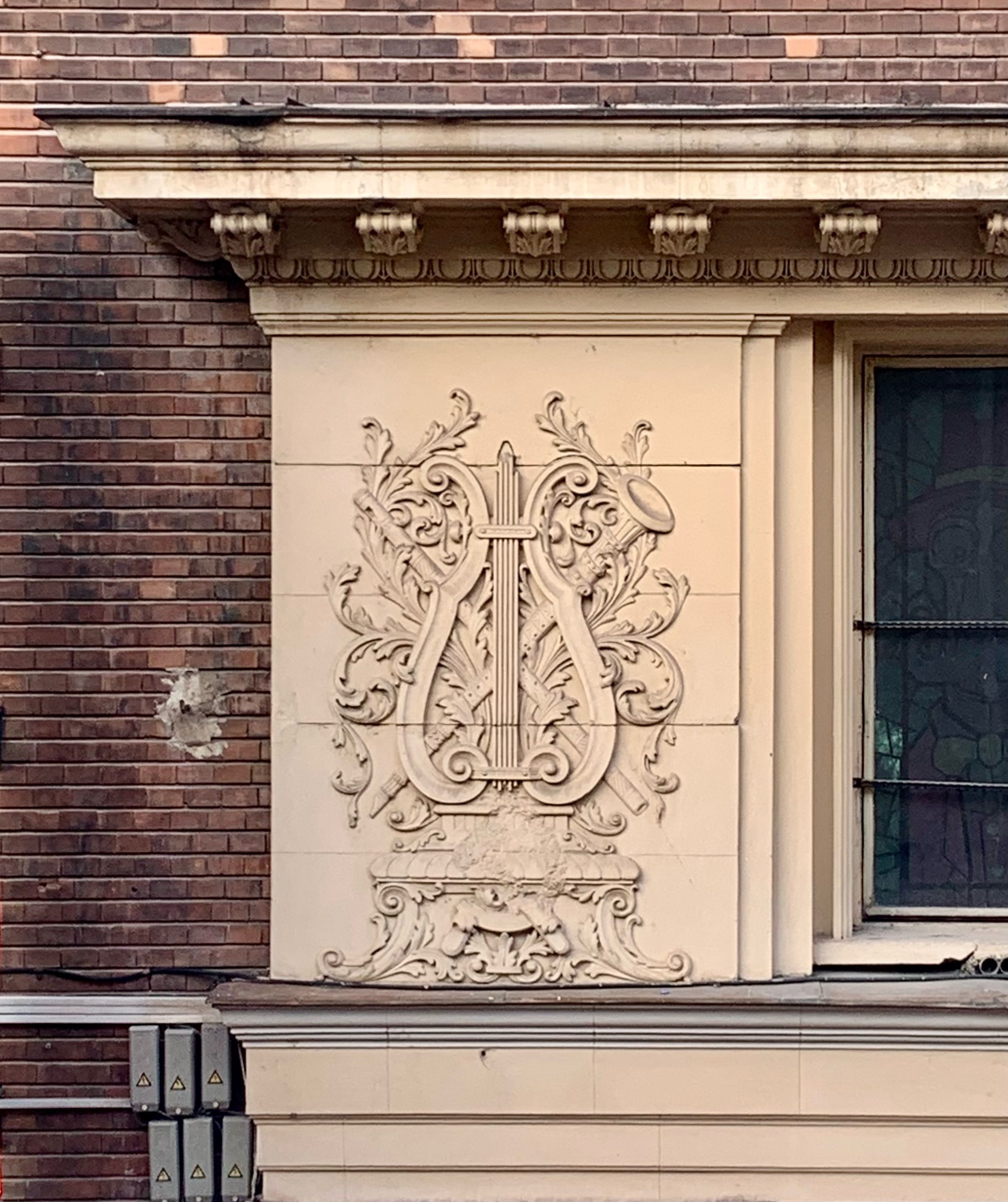
Relief on the Rapsodia Hall on Strada Lipscani, Bucharest, late 1940s-1950s, unknown sculptor

Scînteia House, Bucharest, 1948–1955, by Horia Maicu, Nicolae Bădescu, Marcel Locar, Mircea Alifanti et al.

Colonels' Quarter, Bucharest, 1950–1960, by I.Novițchi, C.Ionescu, C.Hacker and A.Șerbescu

National Opera (Opera House and Ballet Theatre), Bucharest, 1952–1953, by Octav Doicescu, Paraschiva Iubu, Nicolae Cucu and Dan Slavici

Building in the Palace/Revolution Square, Bucharest, 1952–1954, by Richard Bordenache

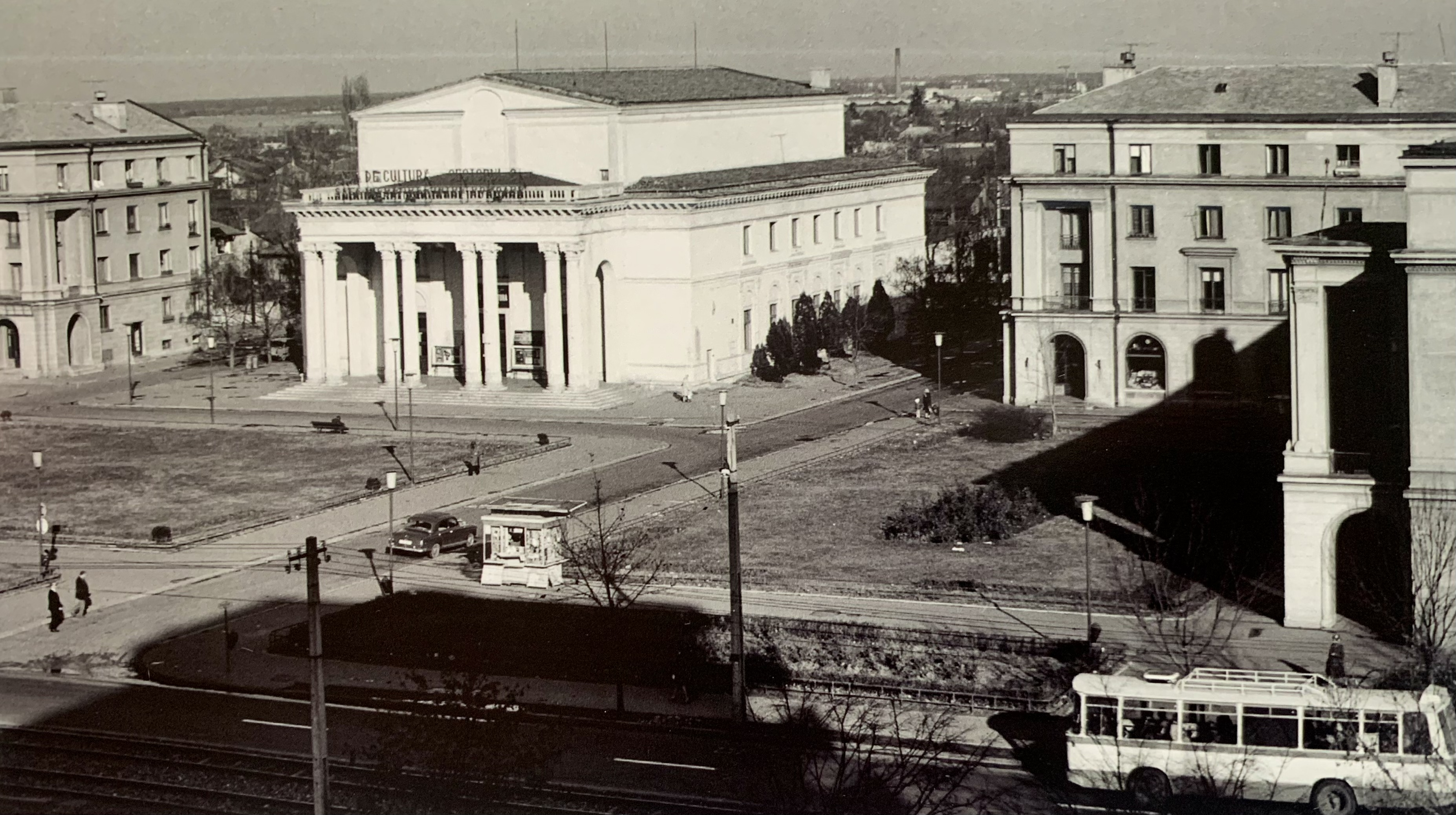
"Brotherhood Between Nations" complex, Bucharest, 1954–1958, by N. Porumbescu, D. Bacalu and T. Stănescu

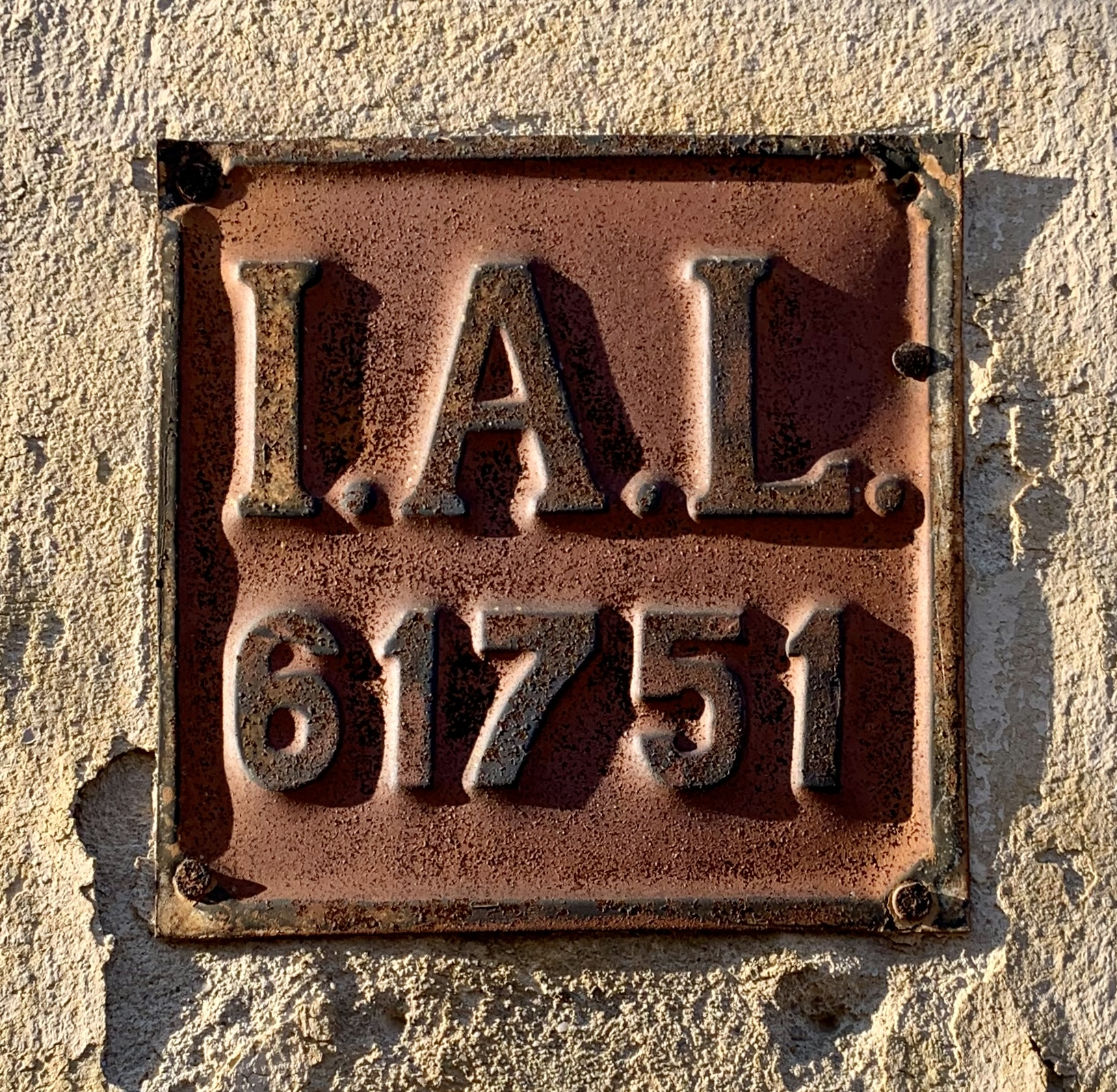
I.A.L. plate on Strada Apolodor in Bucharest

From 1948, the new Communist regime - so-called people's democracy - began to have a big control over all aspects of life, including architecture, dictating a uniform bureaucratic vision of urbanism and architectural design. This is when interwar Bauhaus-like Modernism ends in Romania, being replaced by Socialist Realism, the style that characterizes 1930s' Moscow architecture. Due to the fact that Romania had to recover after the war, examples of Socialist Realist architecture are relatively rare. The style is more or less easy to spot, by its use of Neoclassical elements and proportions, but in a simplified way (not to be confused with Stripped Classicism, which was much more minimalistic). Gheorghe Gheorghiu-Dej was premier of the Socialist Republic of Romania from 1947 until 1965. He began the country's policies of industrialization, with infrastructure development for heavy industry, and construction for mass resettlement to new industrial and agricultural centers away from Bucharest and other principal cities.

During the Communist period, houses and apartment buildings built previously were nationalized. In 1950, with the Decree 92 of 19 April 1950, a huge number of private houses and lands are confiscated. Because of this, IAL (Întreprinderea de Administrare Locativă; the Enterprise of Locative Management) appeared, later renamed ICRAL (Întreprinderea de Construcții, Reparații și Administrare Locativă; the Enterprise for Building, Repairs, Locative Management). As the names suggest, this institution managed buildings, renovating them if necessary. Each nationalized building had a small metal tile with IAL and a unique code.

=== Postwar Modernism (1960-c.1980) ===
Palace Hall, Bucharest, by Horia Maicu, Tiberiu Ricci, Ignace Șerban and Romeo Balea, 1957–1960

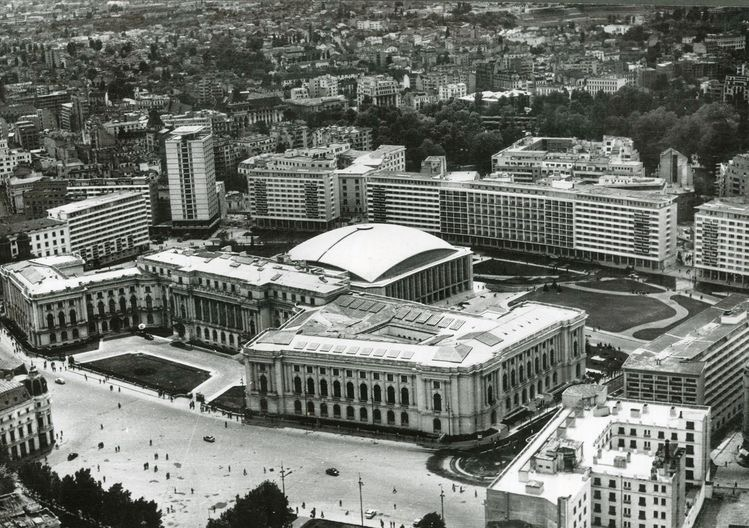
Palace Hall residential complex, Bucharest, by Tiberiu Niga, G. Filipescu, L. Garcia and Anton Moisescu, 1959

Apartment buildings on Calea Griviței, Bucharest, by Virgil Nițulescu, Cleopatra Alifanti, Mircea Bercovici, Renzo Cărăușu, Nicolae Spirescu, Cristina Neagu and Willy Juster, 1958-1965

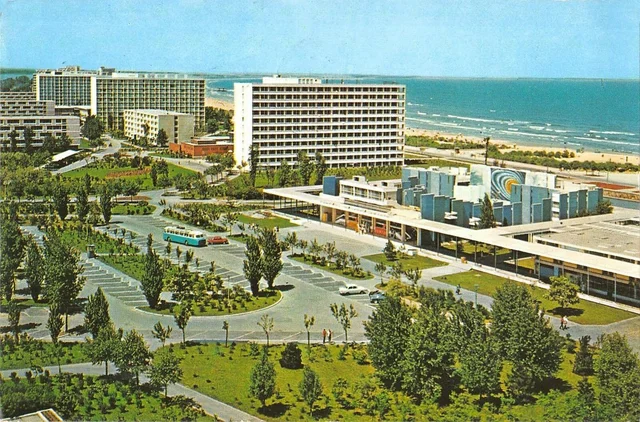
Hotels in Mamaia, Romania, with the Mamaia Summer Theatre in the right, Cezar Lăzărescu et al., 1958–1961

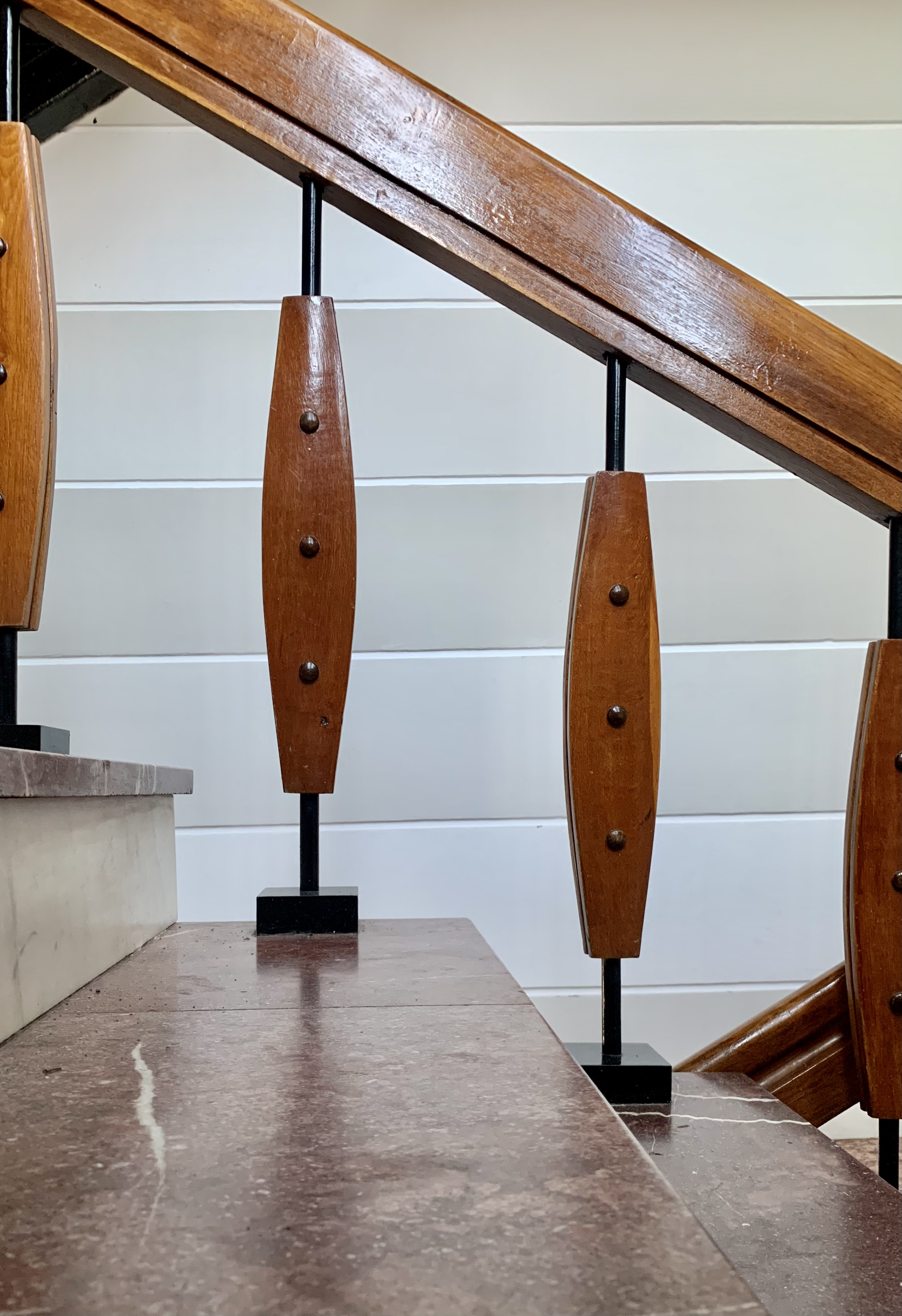
Railing in Strada Octavian no. 10, Alba Iulia, Romania, unknown architect, 1960s

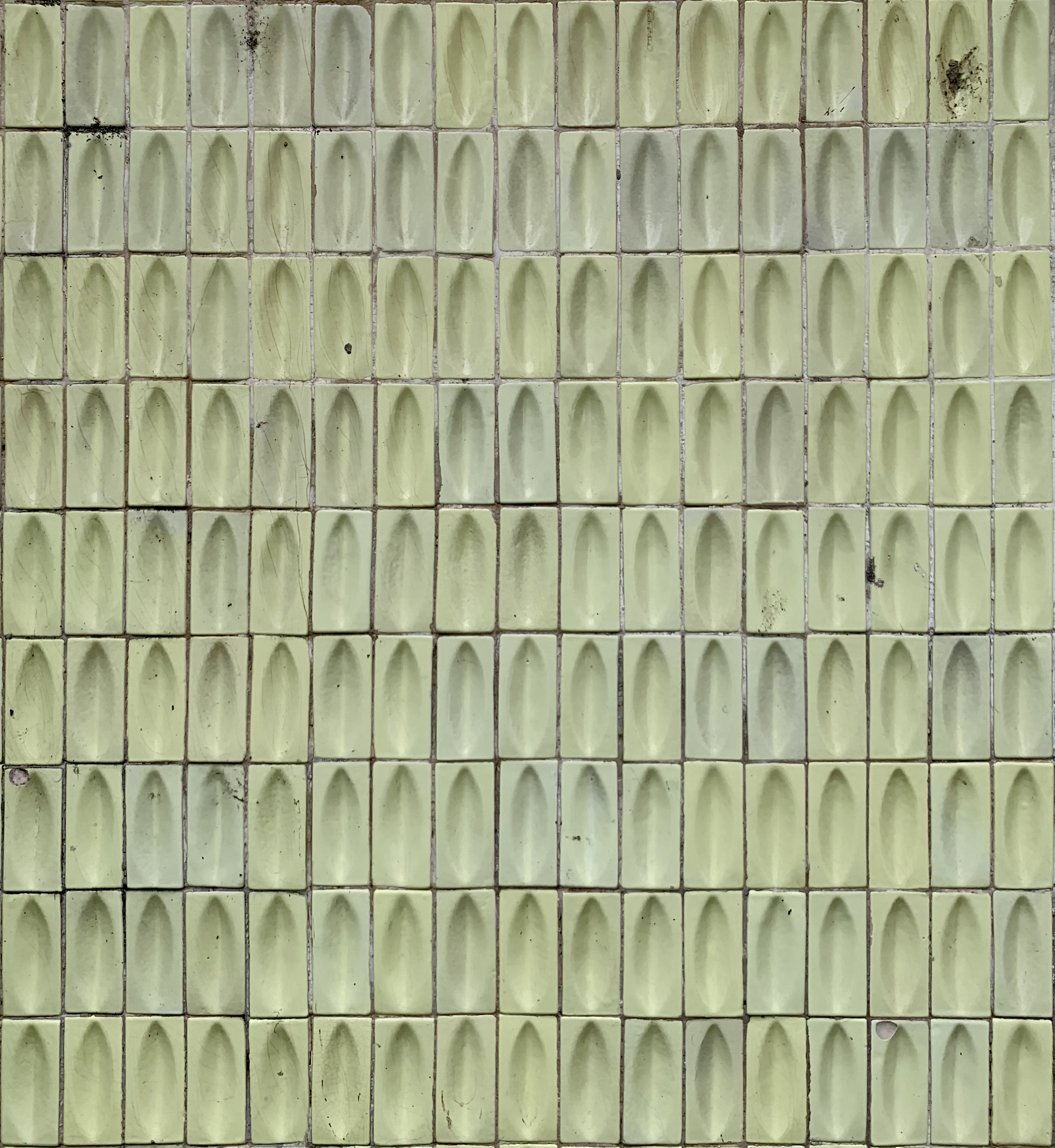
Mosaic wall on a building in Alba Iulia, close to the town hall, unknown architect, 1960s

ROMEXPO Bucharest International Fair (EREN Pavilion), Bucharest, by Ascacio Damian, Mircea Enescu and Vera Hariton, 1963

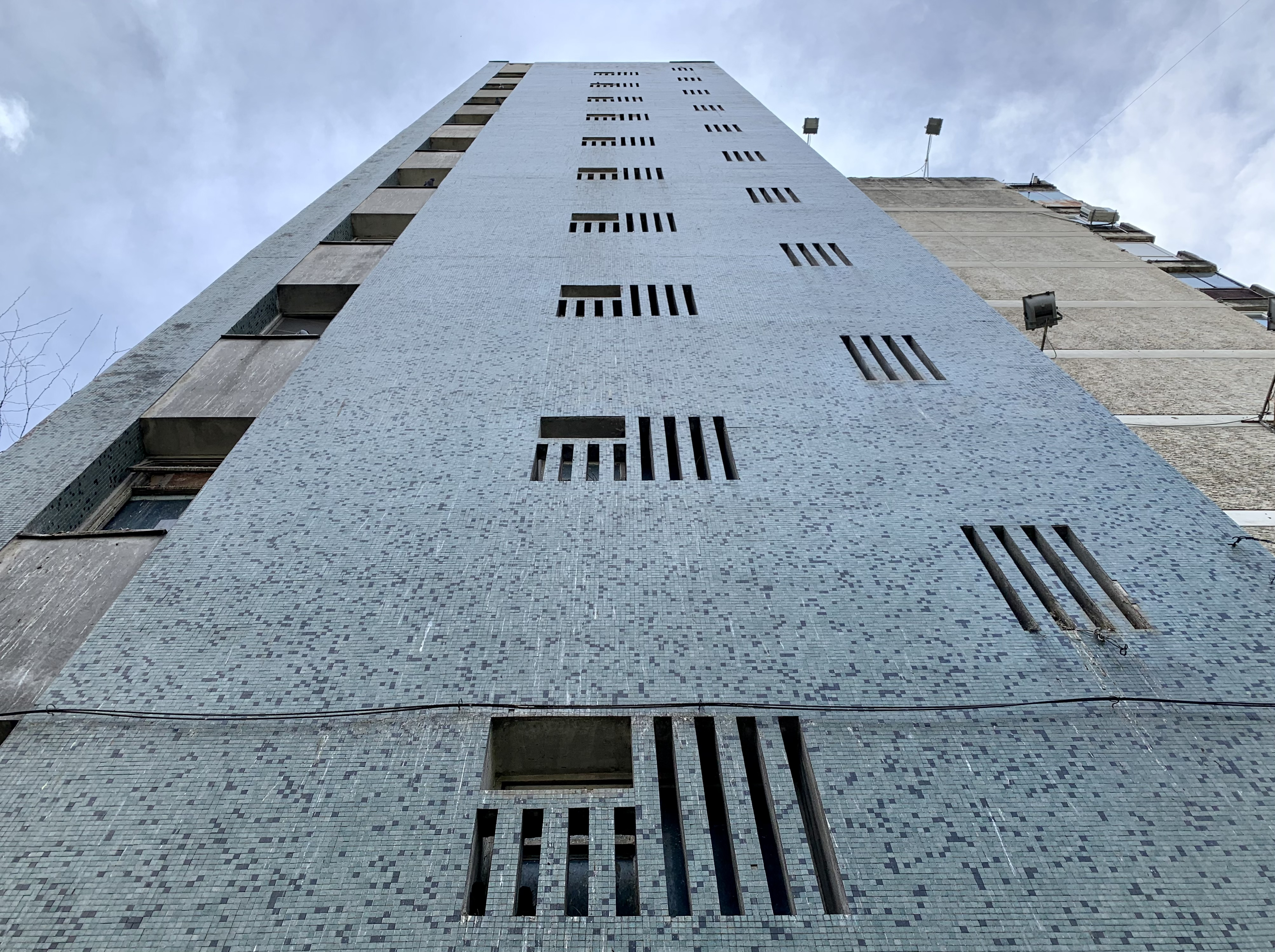
Block N6, Strada Liviu Rebreanu no. 2, Bucharest, unknown architects, 1965–1967

Telephone Palace (Palatul Telefoanelor), Cluj-Napoca, by Vasile Mitrea, 1968

Dorobanți/Mihai Eminescu wing of the Bucharest Academy of Economic Studies (Bulevardul Dacia no. 41), Bucharest, by Cleopatra Alifanti et al., 1967-1970

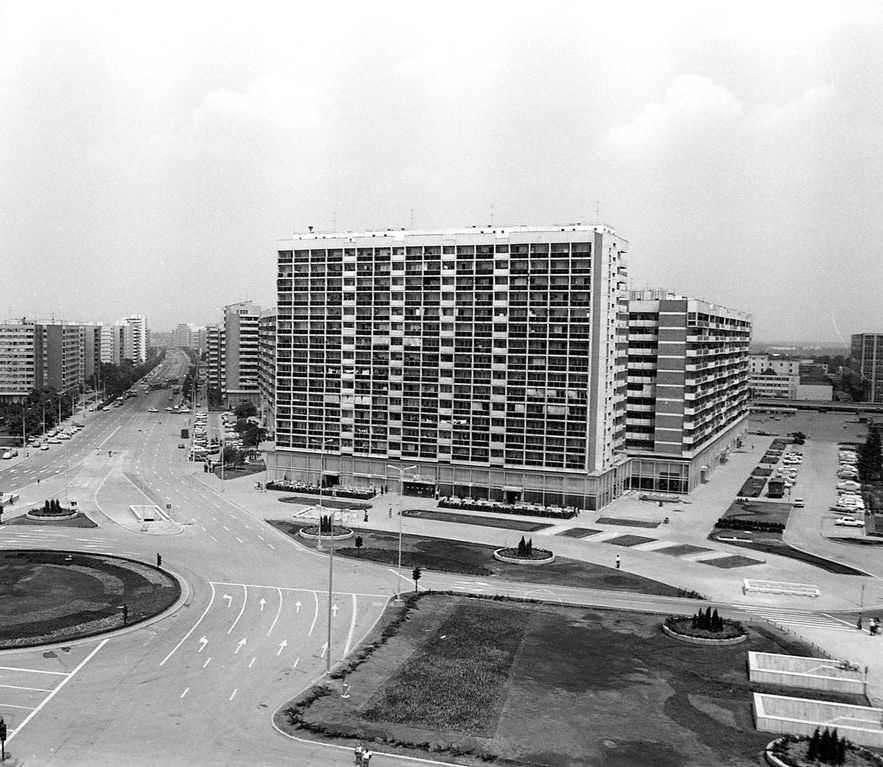
ALMO in the Obor Square, Bucharest, by Mircea Săndulescu, Antonio Teodorov, Eugen Cosmatu; engineers: M. Navodaru, L. Neagoe et al., 1973–1975

Strada Polonă no. 1–5, Bucharest, unknown architects, late 1970s

There are millions of people who in the 1950s, 1960s and 1970s had gone through urbanization. They are taken haphazardly from villages and forced to work in factories. They'd live in a flat for the first time in their lives. Had a fridge for the first time. Had a TV and a radio for the first time. Prior to the mid-1970s, Bucharest, as most other cities, was developed by expanding the city, especially towards the south, east, and west.

High density dormitory neighbourhoods were built at the outskirts of cities. Due to these expansions, suburban villages and commune were administratively annexed by big cities. For example, in the case of Bucharest, during the 1950s, 1960s and 1970s, the Obor, Pantelimon, Berceni, Bucureștii Noi, Giurgiului, and Titan areas were newly incorporated into the city.

Contrary to the principle of equality that the Communist regime promoted, the collective housing projects from the period had different qualities. Some were designed to cram in as many people as possible, while others had large apartments for the ruling elite.

=== The Systematizations and Postmodernism (1977–1990) ===
Palace of Parliament, Bucharest, started in 1984, by Anca Petrescu

Apartment block on Bulevardul Unirii, Bucharest, the 1980s, unknown architects

Piața Iuliu Maniu no. 14, Alba Iulia, Romania, 1980s, unknown architects

Nationalism, characterizing the last stage of Romanian communism, did not extend to contemporary Romanian architecture. Romanian Systematization was the program of urban planning carried out under the communist regime of Nicolae Ceauşescu (r. 1965–1989), after his 1971 visit to North Korea and China. It forced projects, designed with an architecture of pre-fab technology, that resulted in the construction of high density dormitory neighborhoods, with huge housing blocks of numerous eight to ten-story buildings housing flats, that leveled core district cityscapes. The fast urban growth respected neither traditional rural values nor a positive ethic of urbanism.

==== Mass demolitions ====
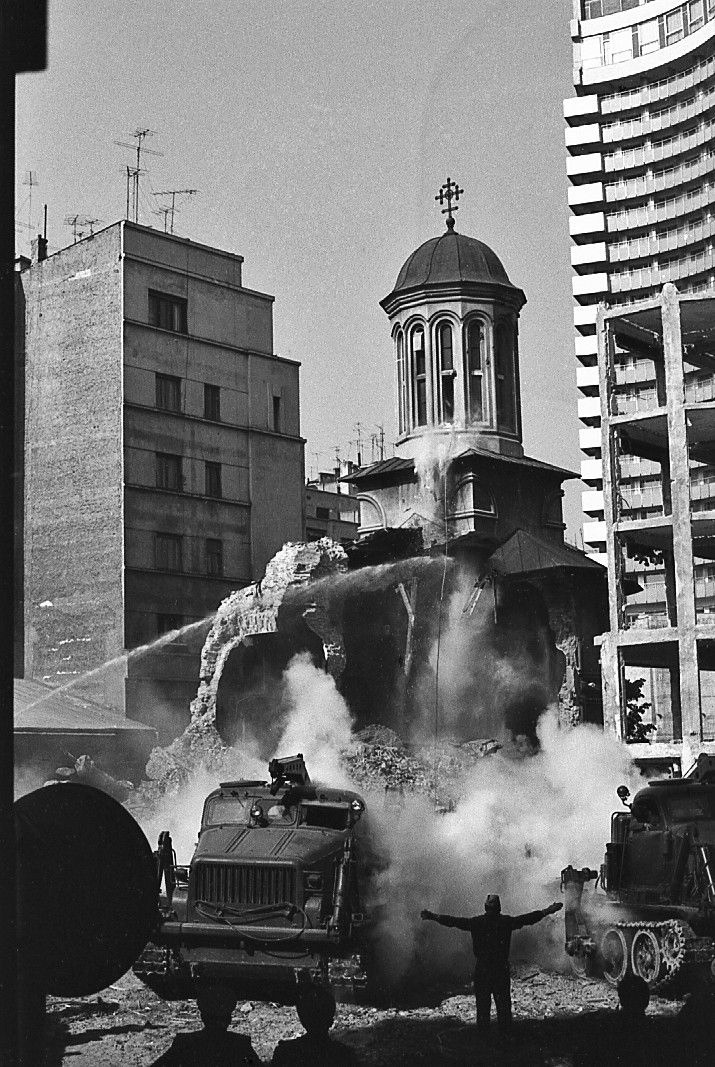
Enei Church, Bucharest, 1720–1724, demolished in 1977, unknown architect

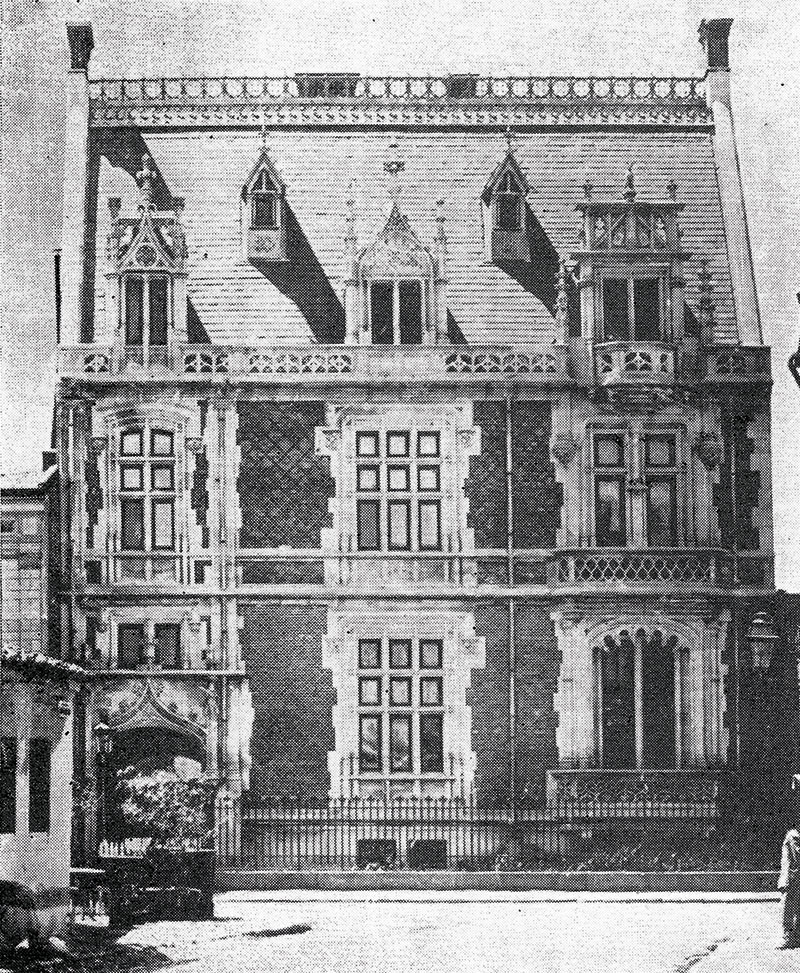
Grigore Cerkez House on Strada Sevastopol, Bucharest, 1898, demolished in 1977, probably by Grigore Cerkez

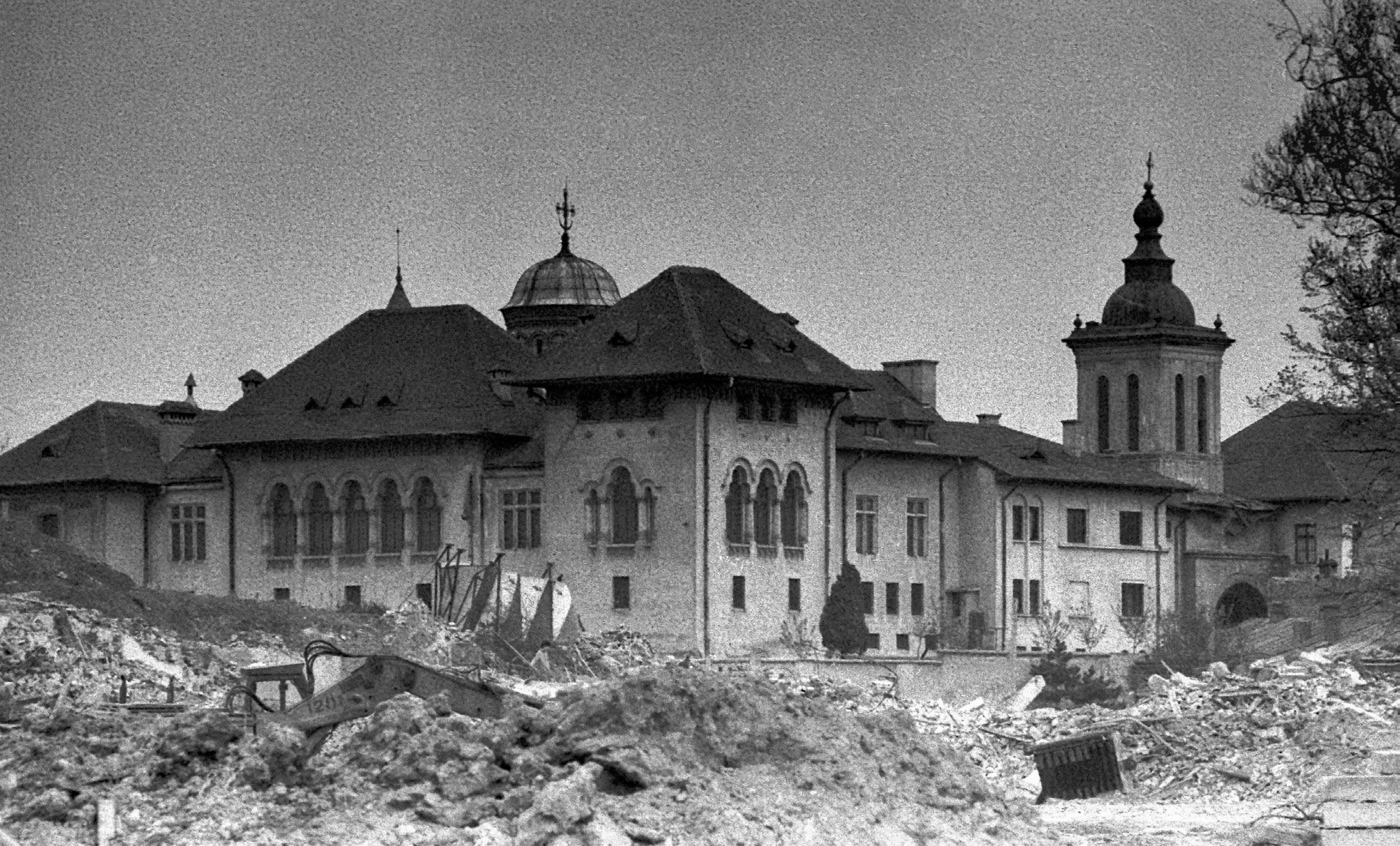
Mihai Vodă Monastery, Bucharest, founded in 1594, demolished in 1985-1986 while the church and the bell tower were moved 270 meters from their initial place to be saved, by engineer Eugeniu Iordăchescu behind 1980s apartment buildings, unknown architect

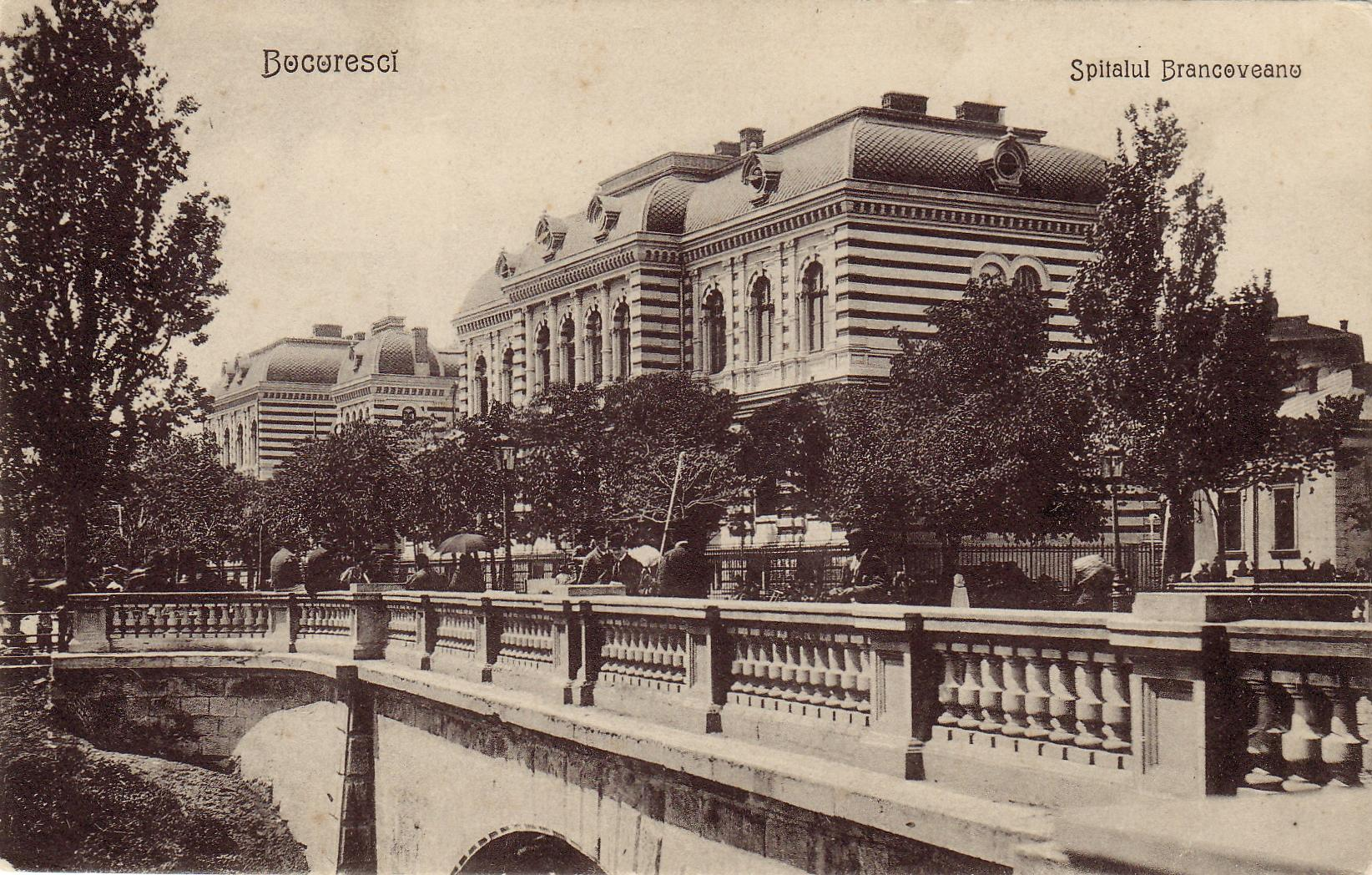
Facade of the new part of the Brâncovenesc Hospital in Piața Unirii, Bucharest, 1880–1890, demolished in 1986, by Karl Benisch

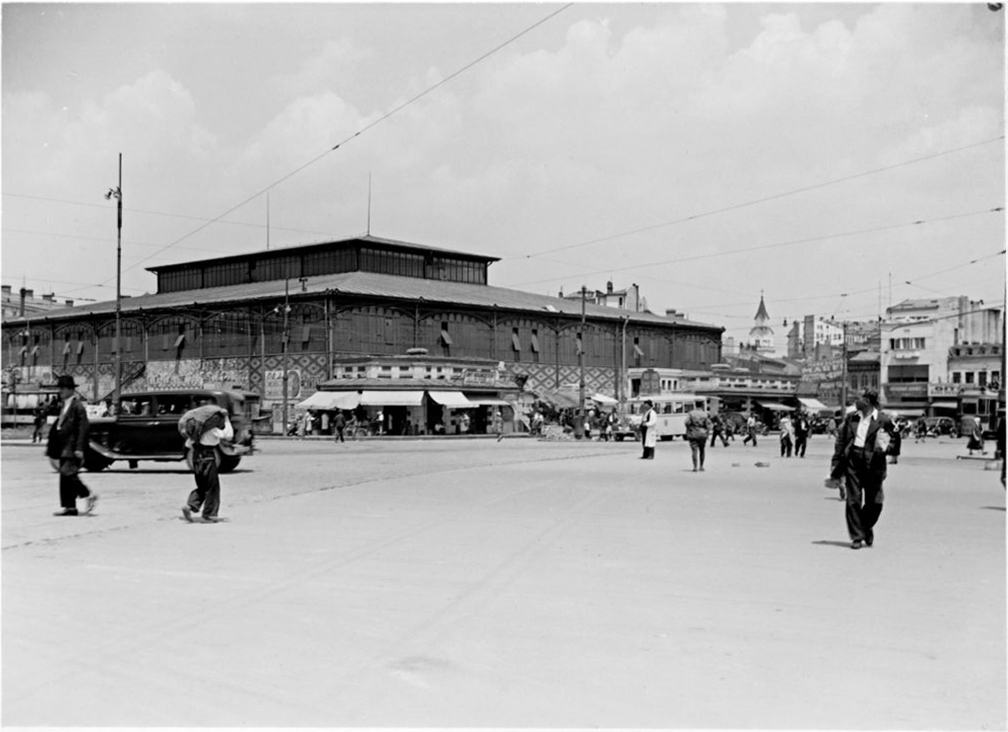
Les Halles-inspired smaller hall in Piața Unirii, Bucharest, 1872, demolished in 1986, unknown architect

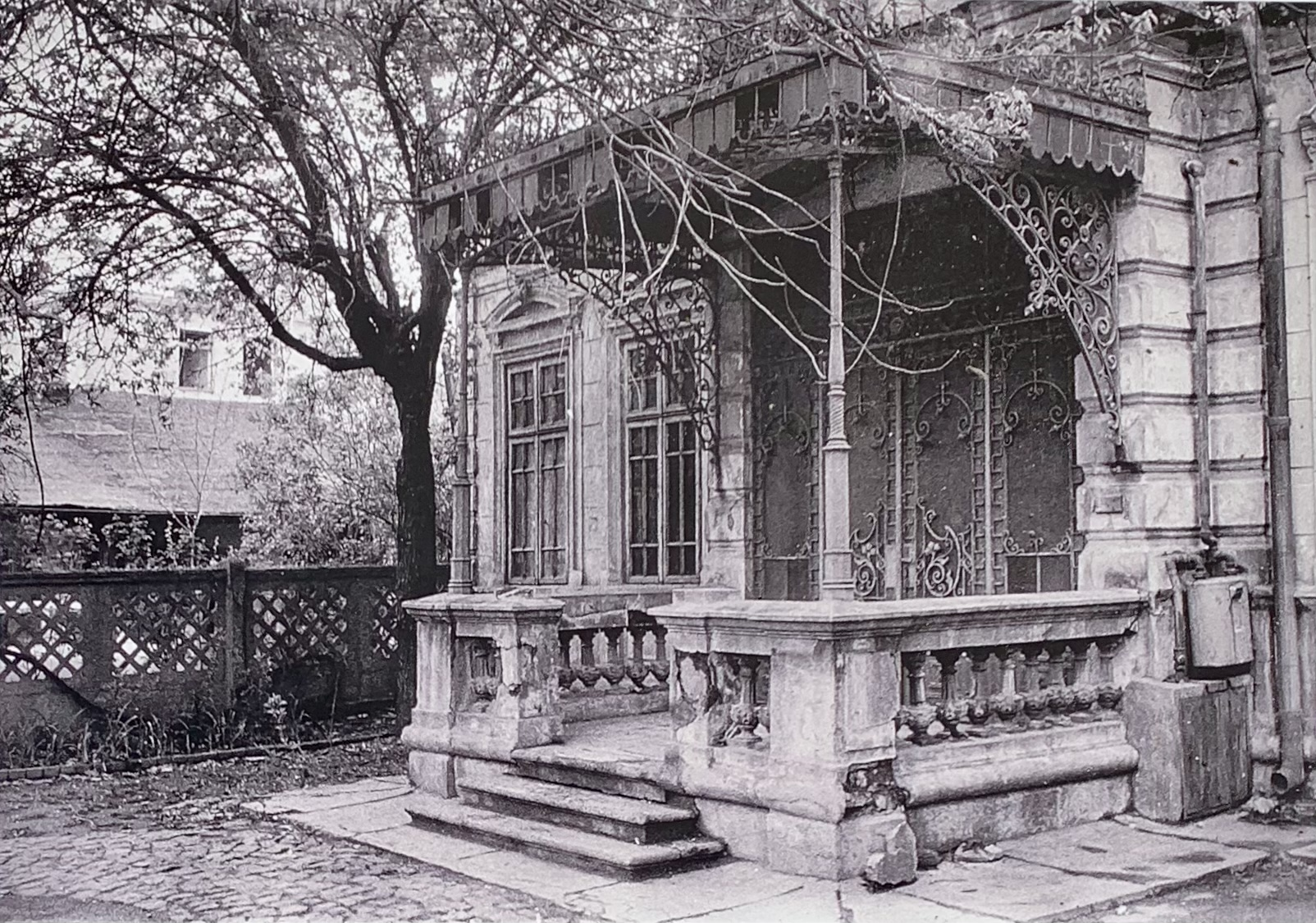
Intrarea Libertății no. 3, Bucharest, c.1900, demolished in the 1980s, unknown architect

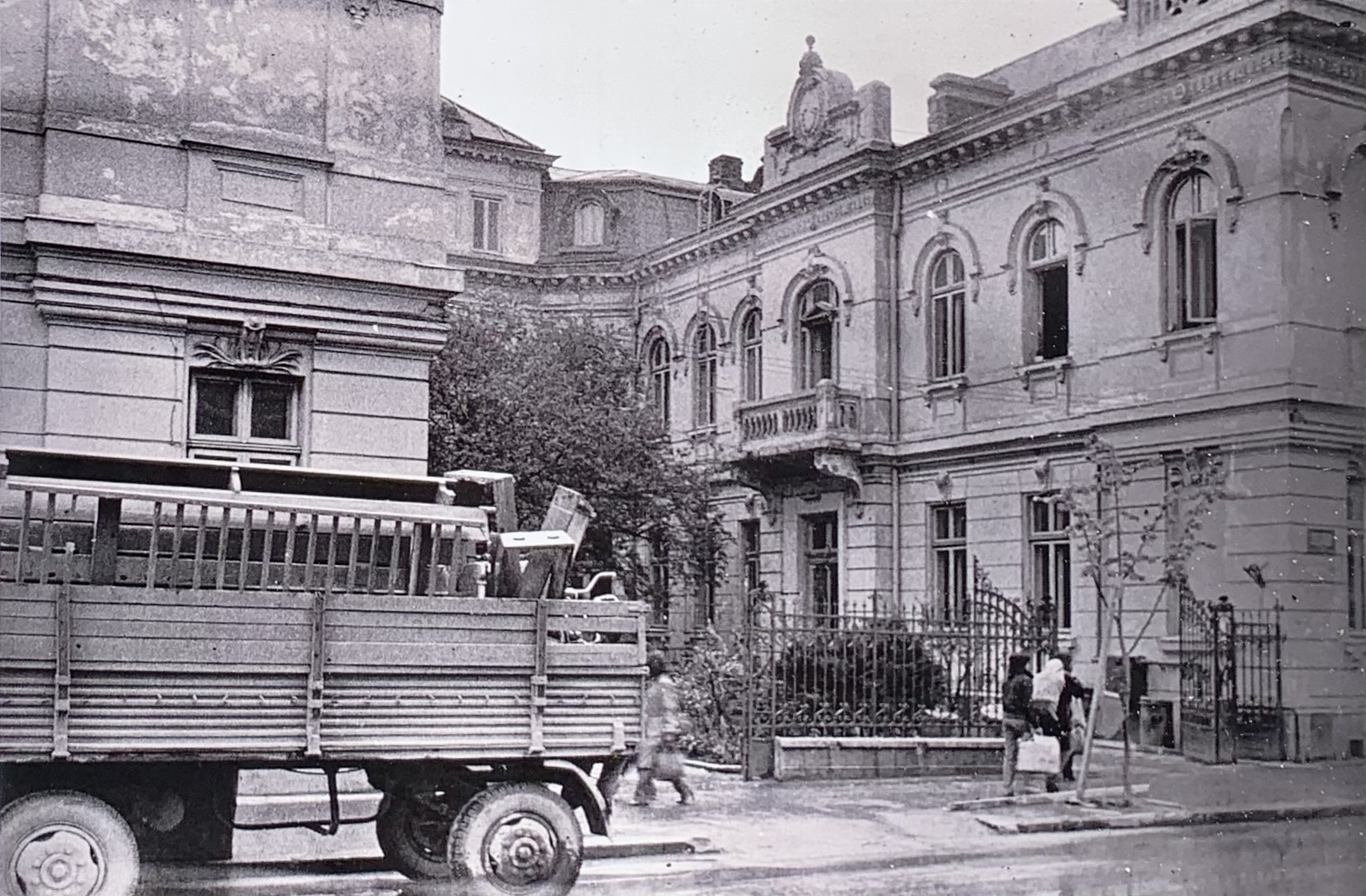
Splaiul Independenței no. 19–21, Bucharest, c.1900, demolished in the 1980s, unknown architect

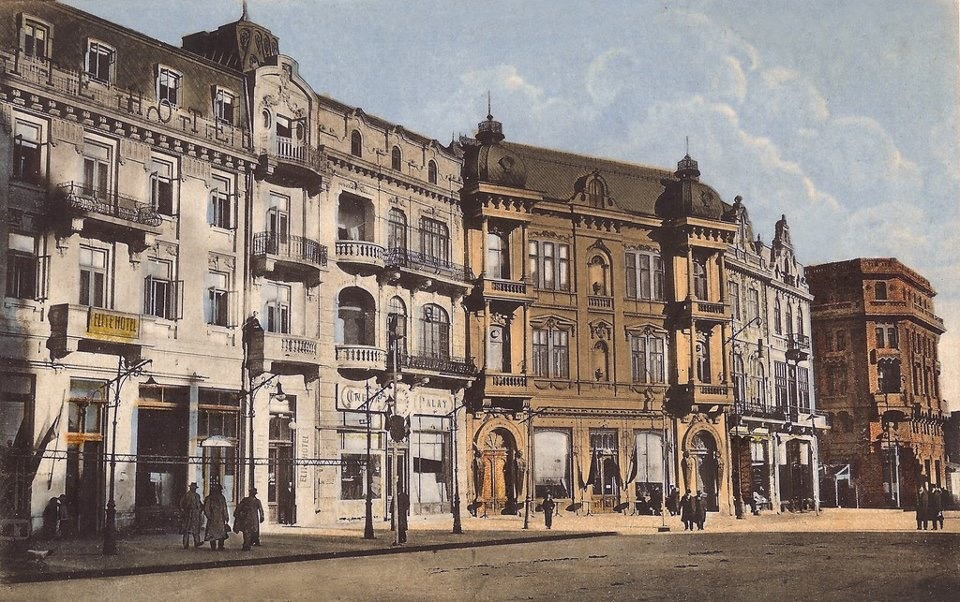
Buildings in Ovidiu Square, Constanța, c.1900-1910, demolished in the 1980s, except the Romanian Revival building from the far right side, unknown architects

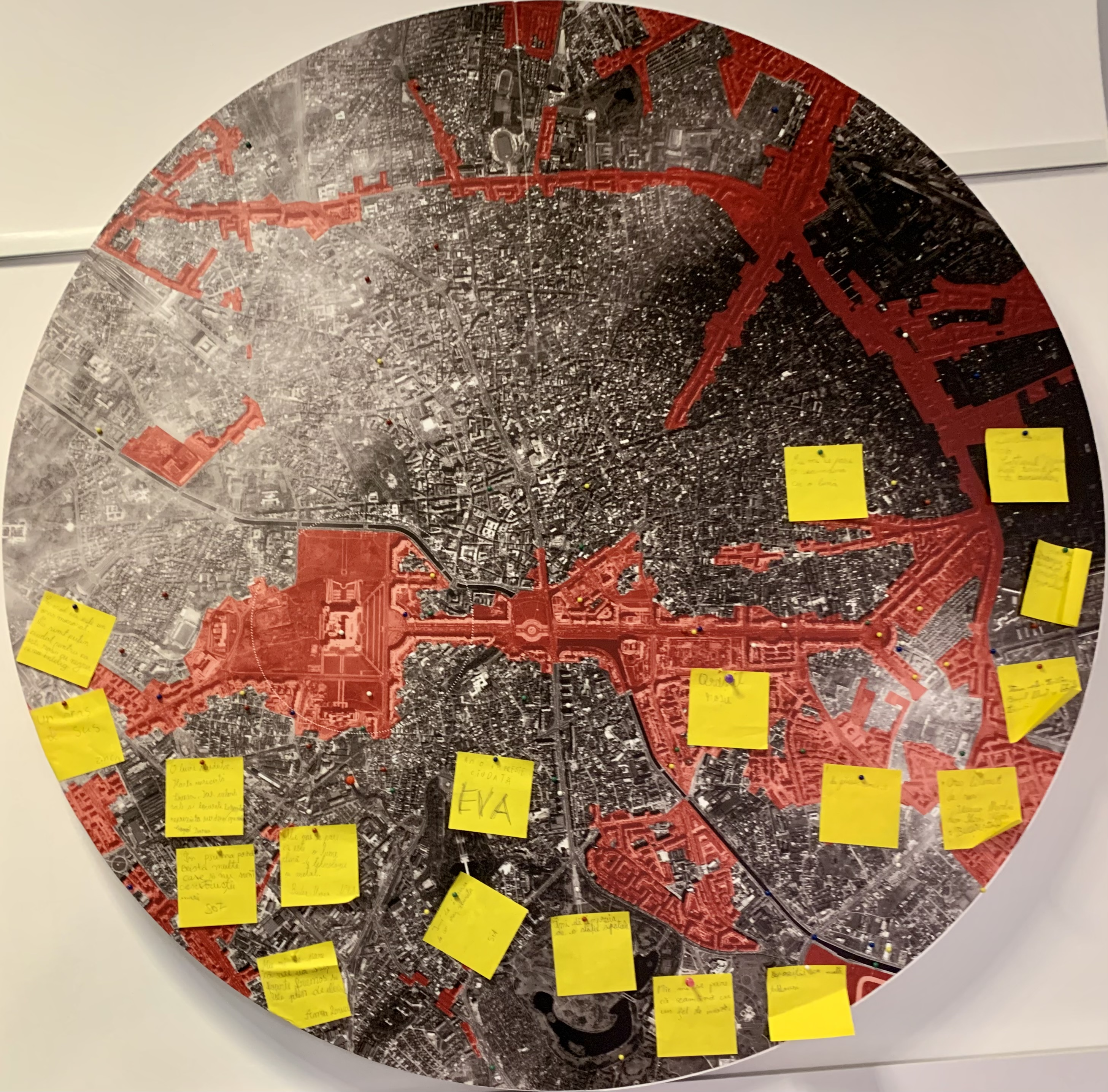
Map of Bucharest centre, highlighting with red the spaces demolished during the Ceaușescu period, on display during an exhibition in the Bucharest City Hall in June 2021

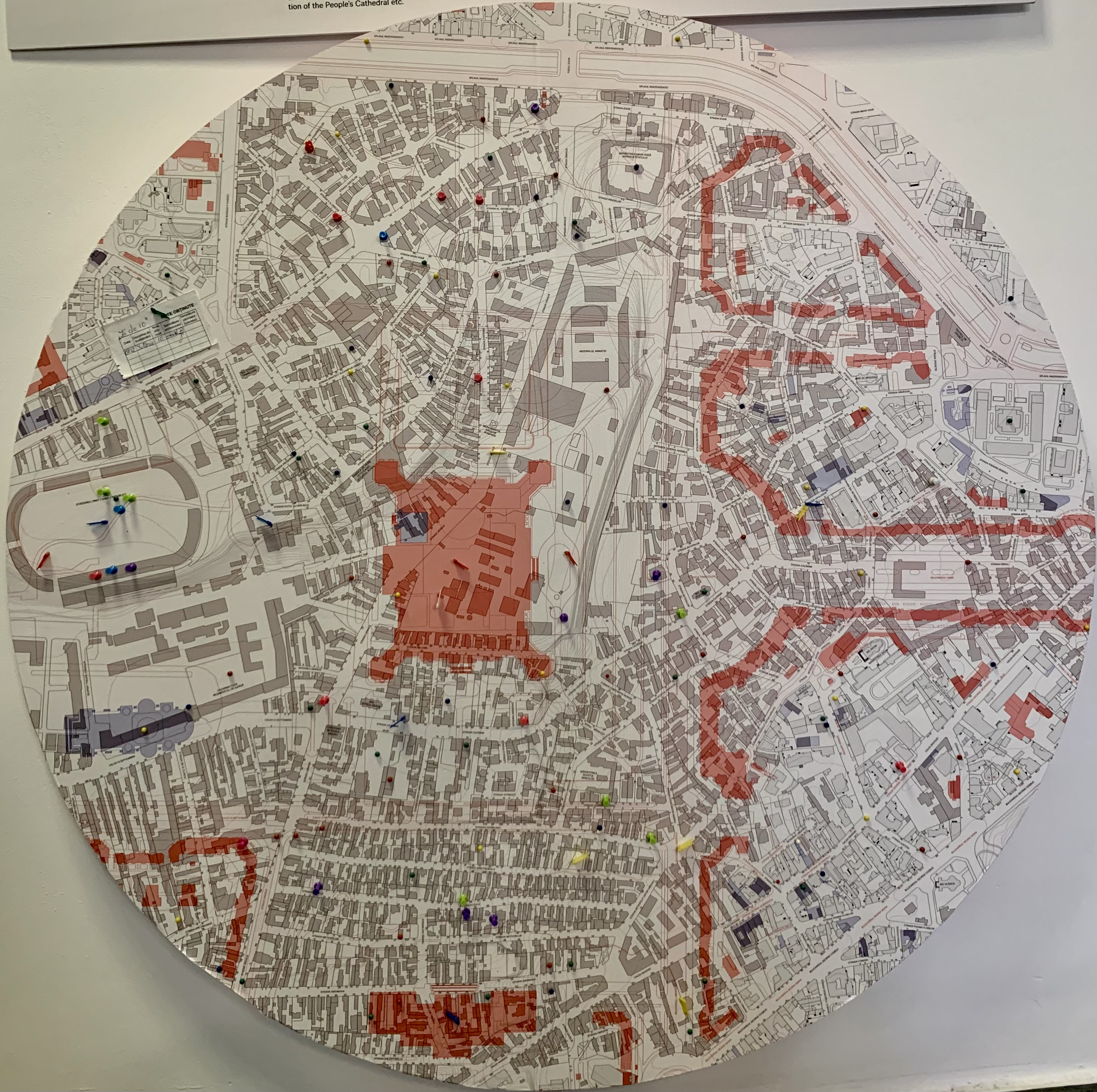
Map of the Uranus area of Bucharest, highlighting with red the spaces occupied by building erected during the Ceaușescu period, on display during an exhibition in the Bucharest City Hall in June 2021. Today, the area shown is largely occupied by the Palace of Parliament, its garden and the Izvor Park

Traditional urban central areas and rural towns were destroyed in a process sarcastically dubbed Ceaușima. They were replaced by conglomerates of blocks of flats and industrial projects. His 'Food Complex' buildings (Circ al foamei), dubbed Hunger circuses, were identical large domed buildings intended as produce markets and food hypermarkets. Ceauşescu also imposed the erection of monumental public buildings, of a dull and eclectic classical solemnity.

The dominant example of the intrusion of Ceaușima egotism into the traditional urban fabric is the Centrul Civic (civic center) in the capital, with its grandiose and huge government palace built by Nicolae Ceauşescu, the 'Palace of the People' now post-revolution renamed the Palace of the Parliament. The civic district's construction necessitated the demolition of much of southern Bucharest beyond the Dâmboviţa River, with 18th and 19th century neighborhoods and their significant architectural masterpieces destroyed. The dominating government Palace is the world's largest civilian building with an administrative function, most expensive administrative building, and heaviest building. It and other edifices in the Centrul Civic are modern concrete buildings behind neoclassical quasi-fascist marble façades.

== Contemporary (1989–present) ==
Charles de Gaulle Plaza, Bucharest, 2000–2006, by Vladimir Arsene et al.

Tower blocks near Văcărești Nature Park, Bucharest, 2006–2010, by Călin Negoescu, Cristina Găleată, Ștefan Cătălin, Cristian Craiveanu, Alexandru Cutelecu

Cathedral Plaza Bucharest, Bucharest, 2007–2011, by Vladimir Arsene, Cristina Ștefan, Onar Gerelioglu et al.

Strada Dimitrie Racoviță no. 4A, Bucharest, 2017, by Corina Dîndărean

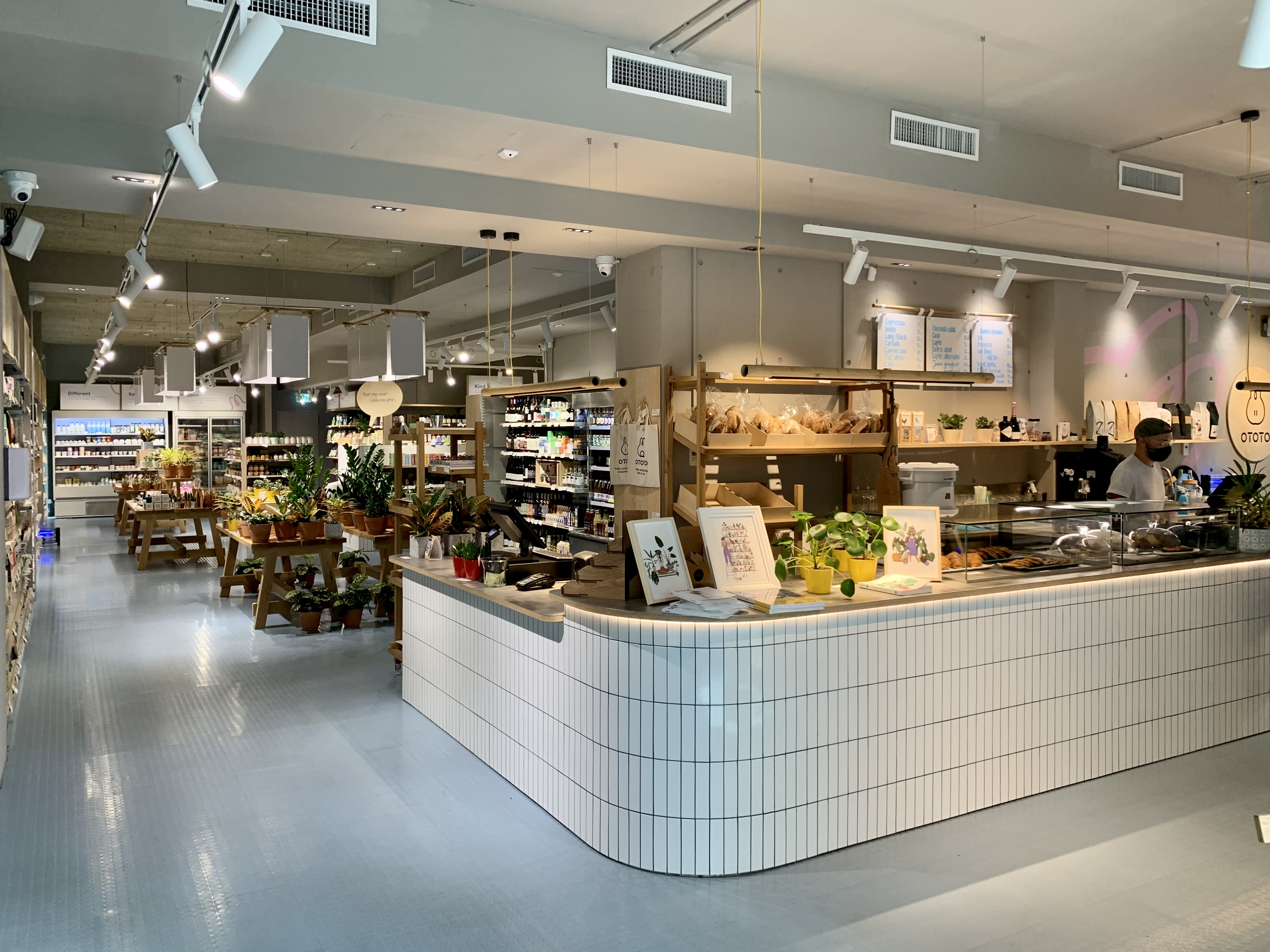
OTOTO Amzei, Bucharest, 2021, unknown interior designer

American-inspired house at the intersection of Strada Stănilești and Strada Duetului, Bucharest, 2022, unknown architect

The Romanian Revolution of 1989 ousted Nicolae Ceaușescu and Communist rule. The post-revolution Romanian culture has, in architecture and planning, been developing new concepts and plans for the country's needs of functionality and national aesthetics in an international context. Many modern 21st century buildings are mostly made of glass and steel. Another a trend is to add modern wings and façades to historic buildings (for example the Headquarters of the Union of Romanian Architects building).

Examples of post-1989 architecture include: Bucharest Financial Plaza, Arena Națională, City Gate Towers, Bucharest Tower Center. Modern high rise residential buildings include the Asmita Gardens.

=== Heritage today ===
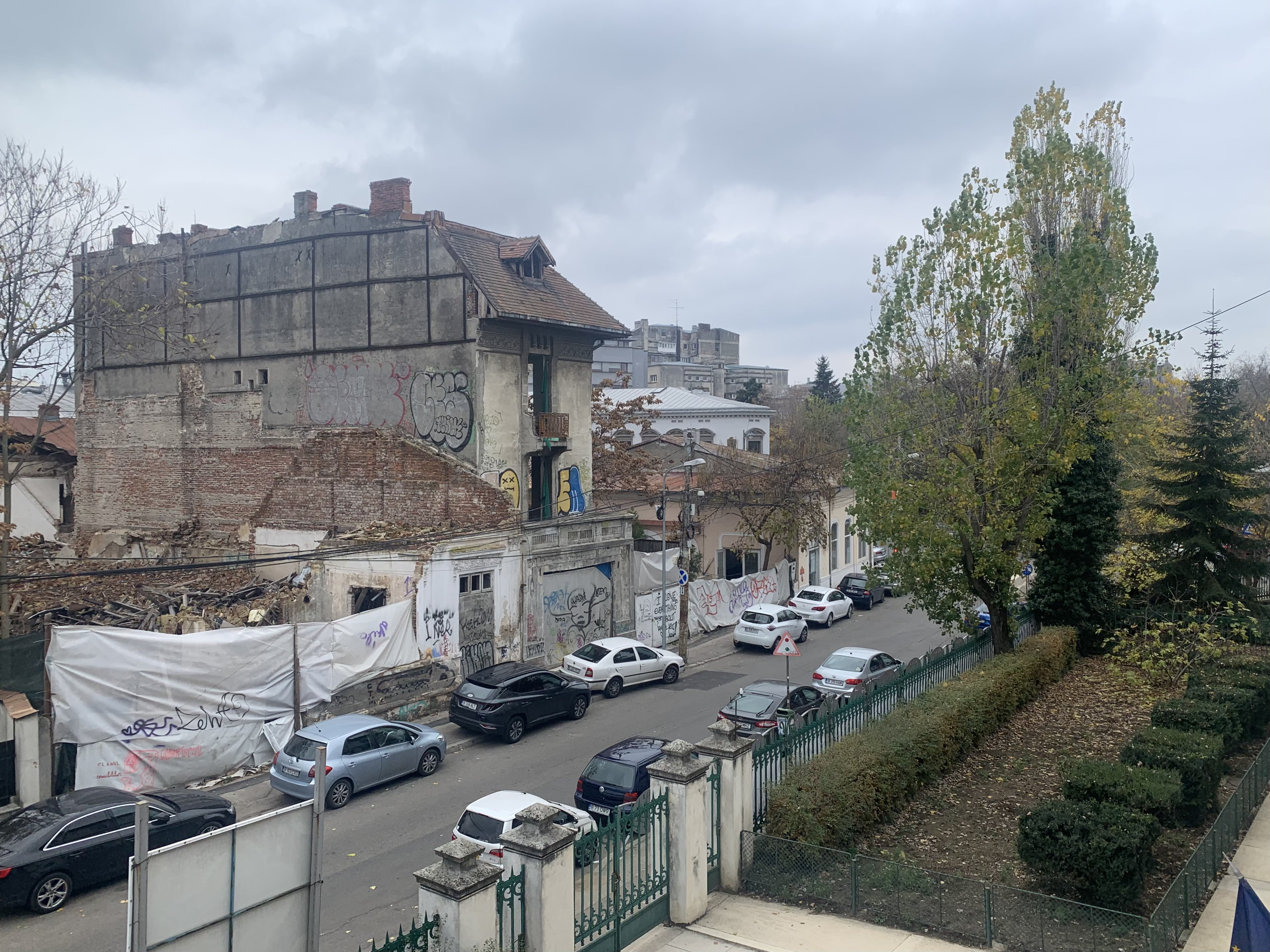
Demolitions - late-19th and early-20th century houses in front of the Școala Centrală National College on Strada Icoanei, Bucharest, demolished in late November 2021 after decades of continuous decay, to make space for an apartment building

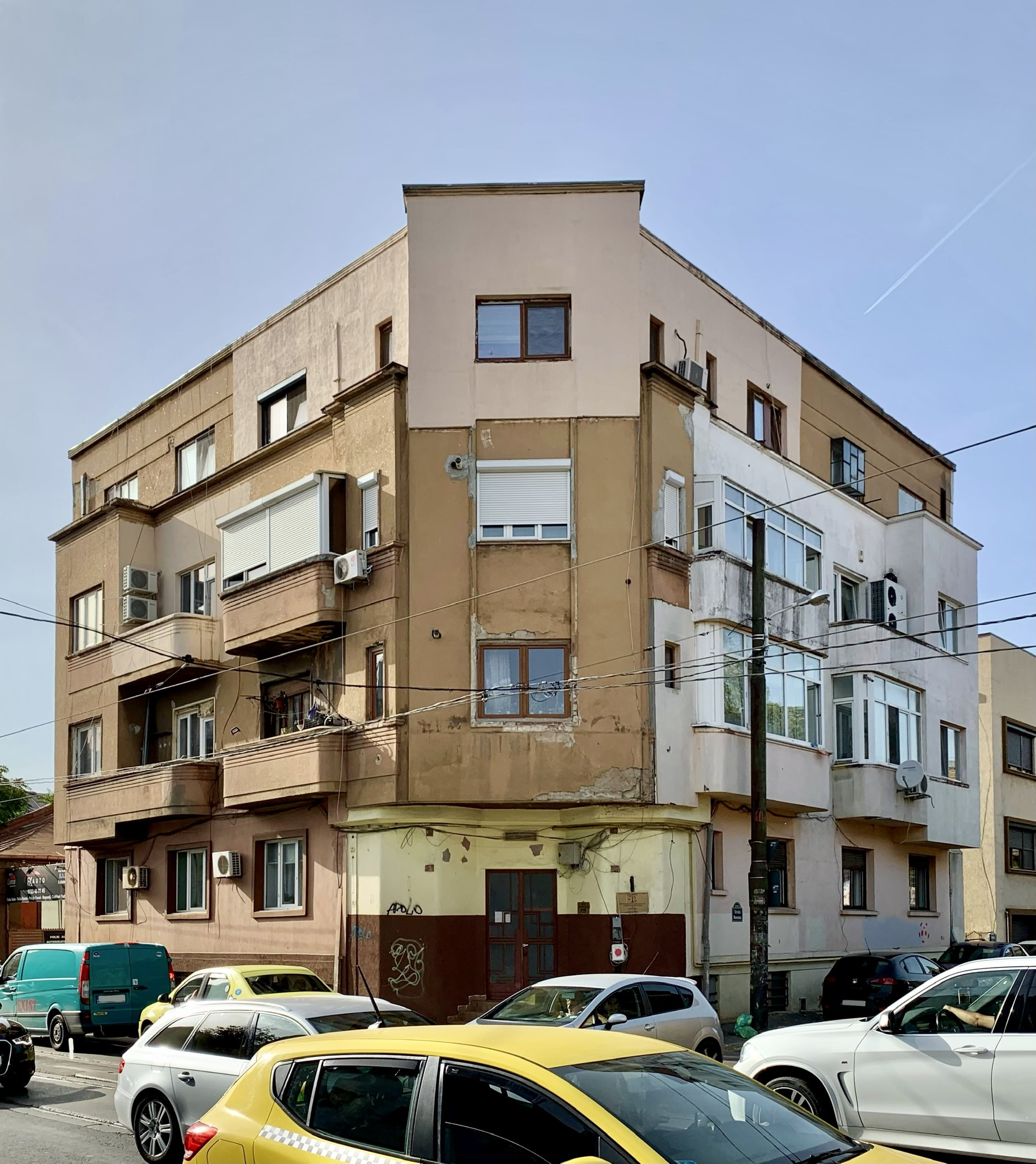
Mutilations - Calea Călărașilor no. 75, Bucharest, a small interwar Art Deco apartment building, where each owner painted the exterior of their apartment how they wanted, thermally insulated or not, thus destroying its facade

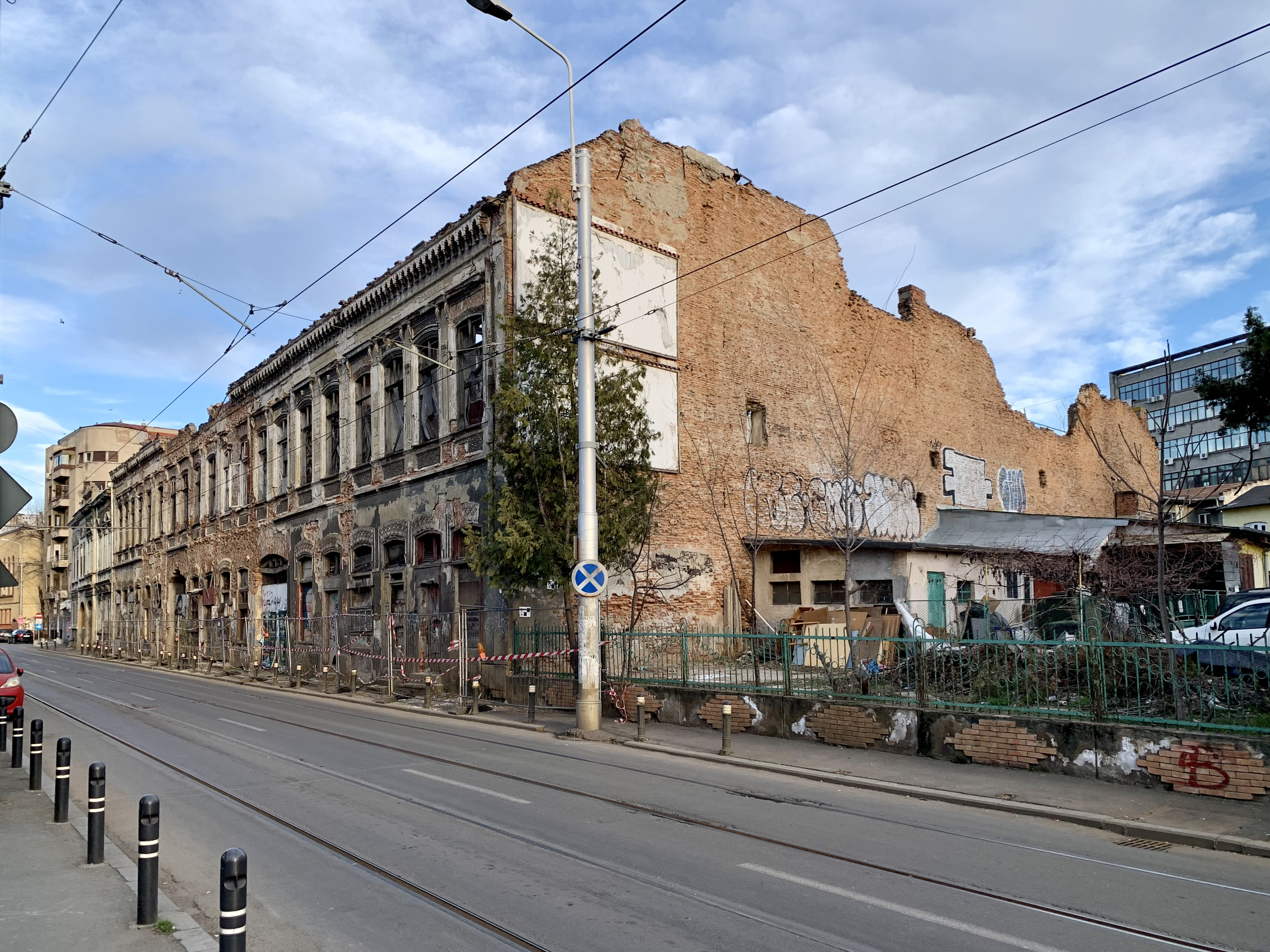
Ruins - Solacolu Inn on Calea Moșilor, Bucharest, a building valuable through its age, from the 1840s and modified during the reign of Alexandru Ioan Cuza (1859-1866), left in a state of ruin, because of the indifference and lack of action of the local authorities, of the inhabitants and of the local community

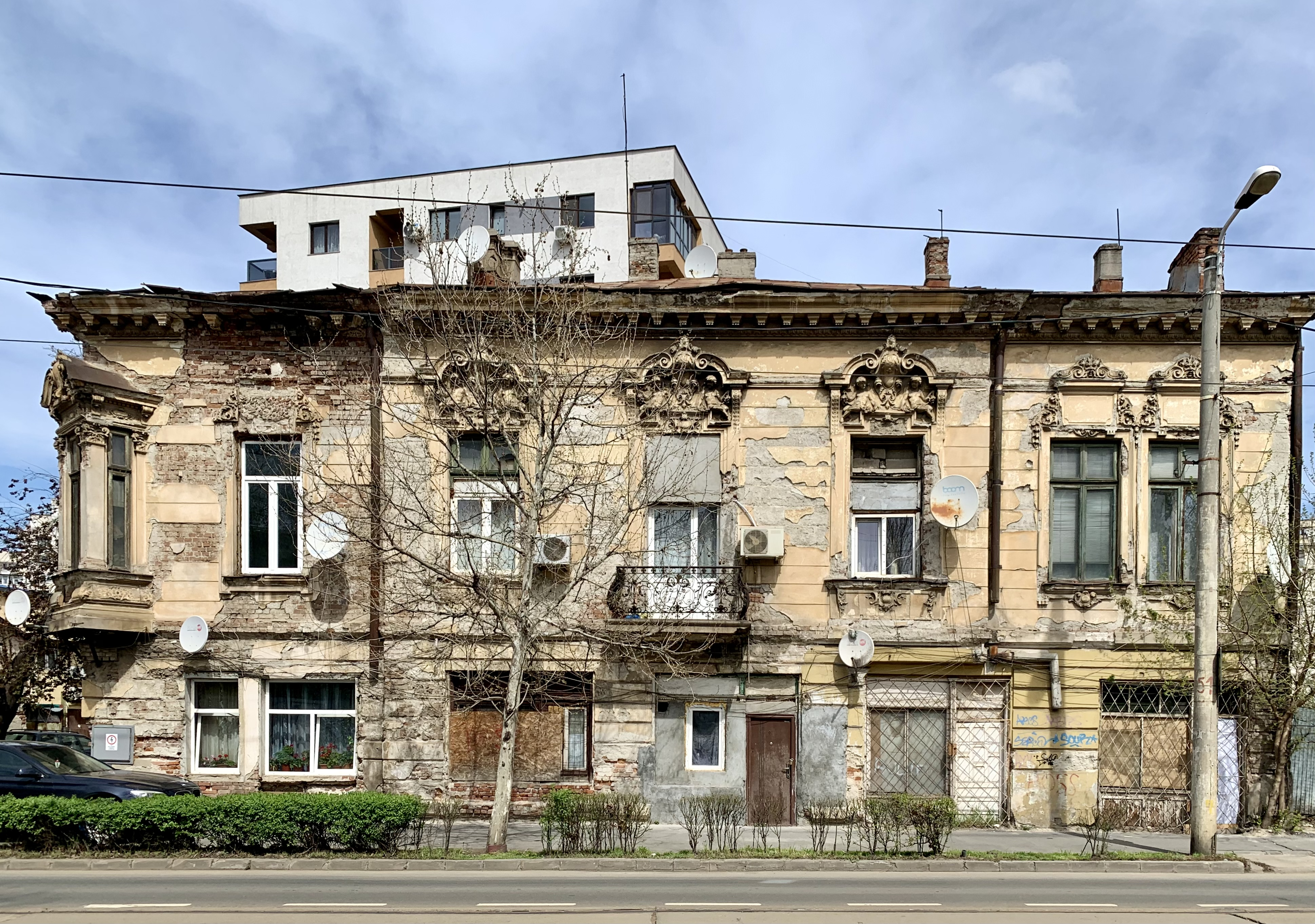
Decay - Calea Dudești no. 125, Bucharest, a Belle Époque mansion, left to crumble, because of the indifference and lack of action of the local authorities, of the inhabitants and of the local community

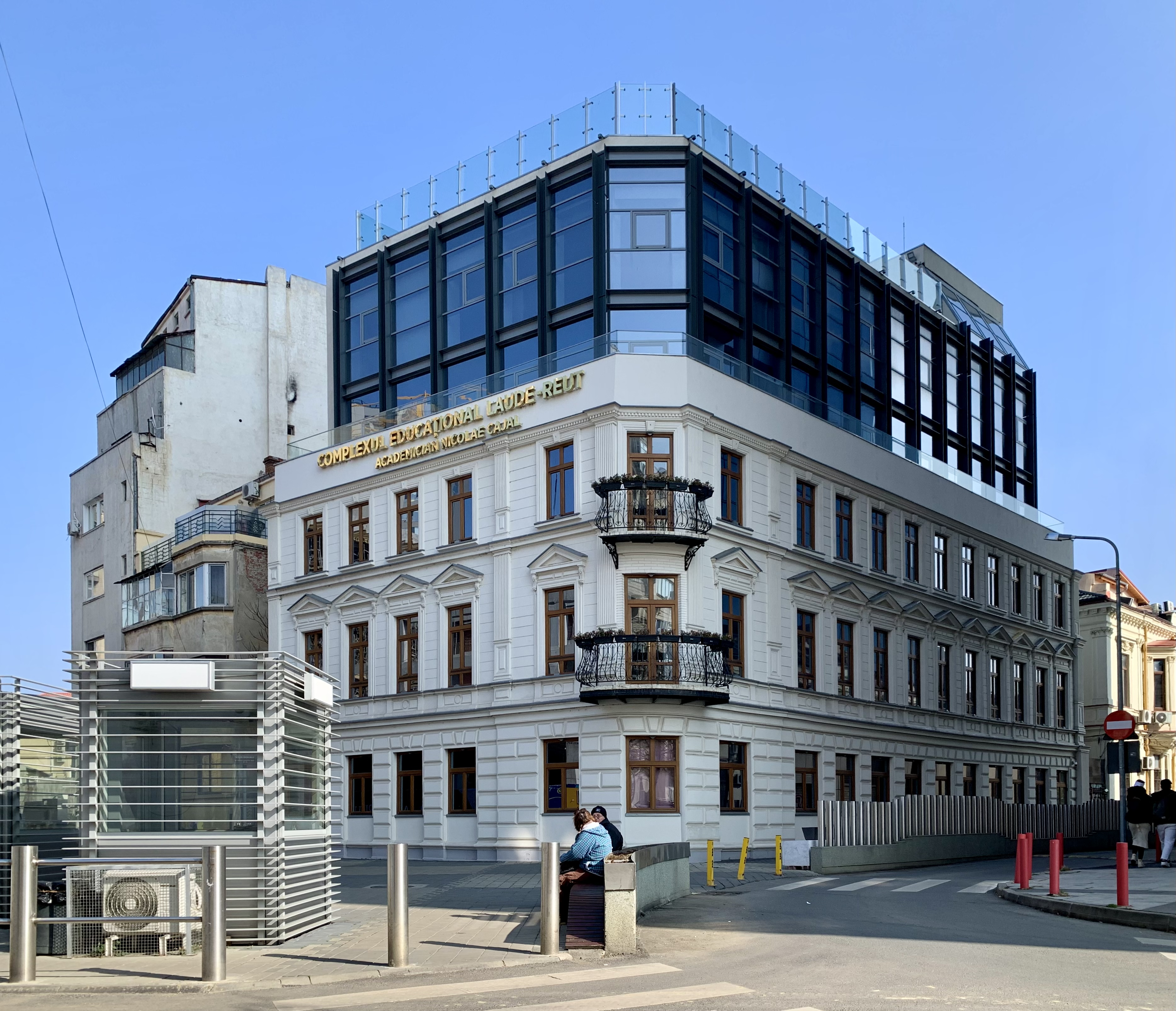
Facadism - Strada Olteni no. 1, Bucharest, one of the few buildings that remained in the area behind Unirea Shopping Center after the massive demolitions from the mid and late-1980s, with its interior and height changed. The only original element remains the facade

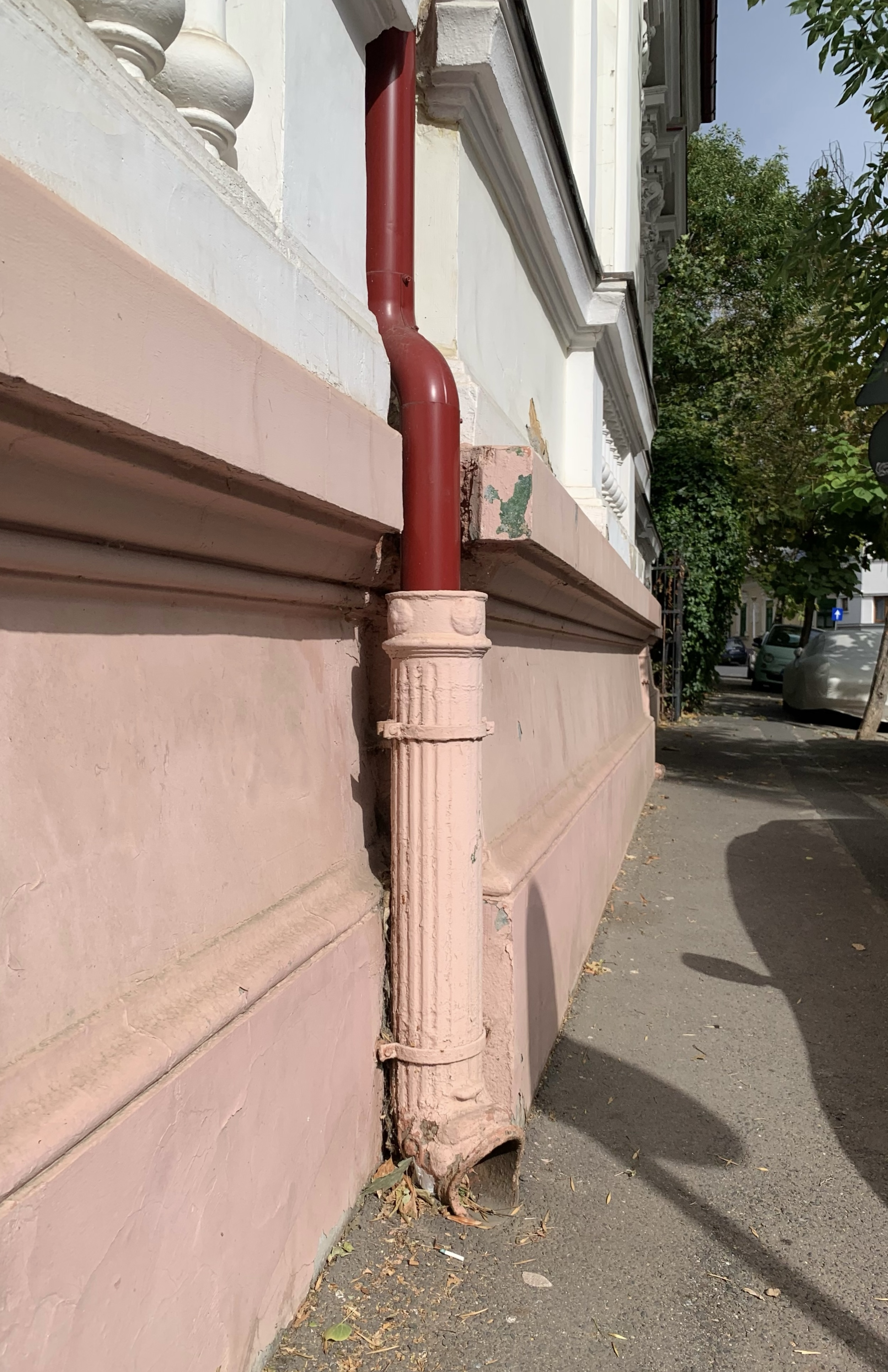
Replacements - Pipe of Strada Popa Soare no. 39, Bucharest. While the lower solid cast iron part of the pipe is still there, the upper one was replaced with something a questionable quality

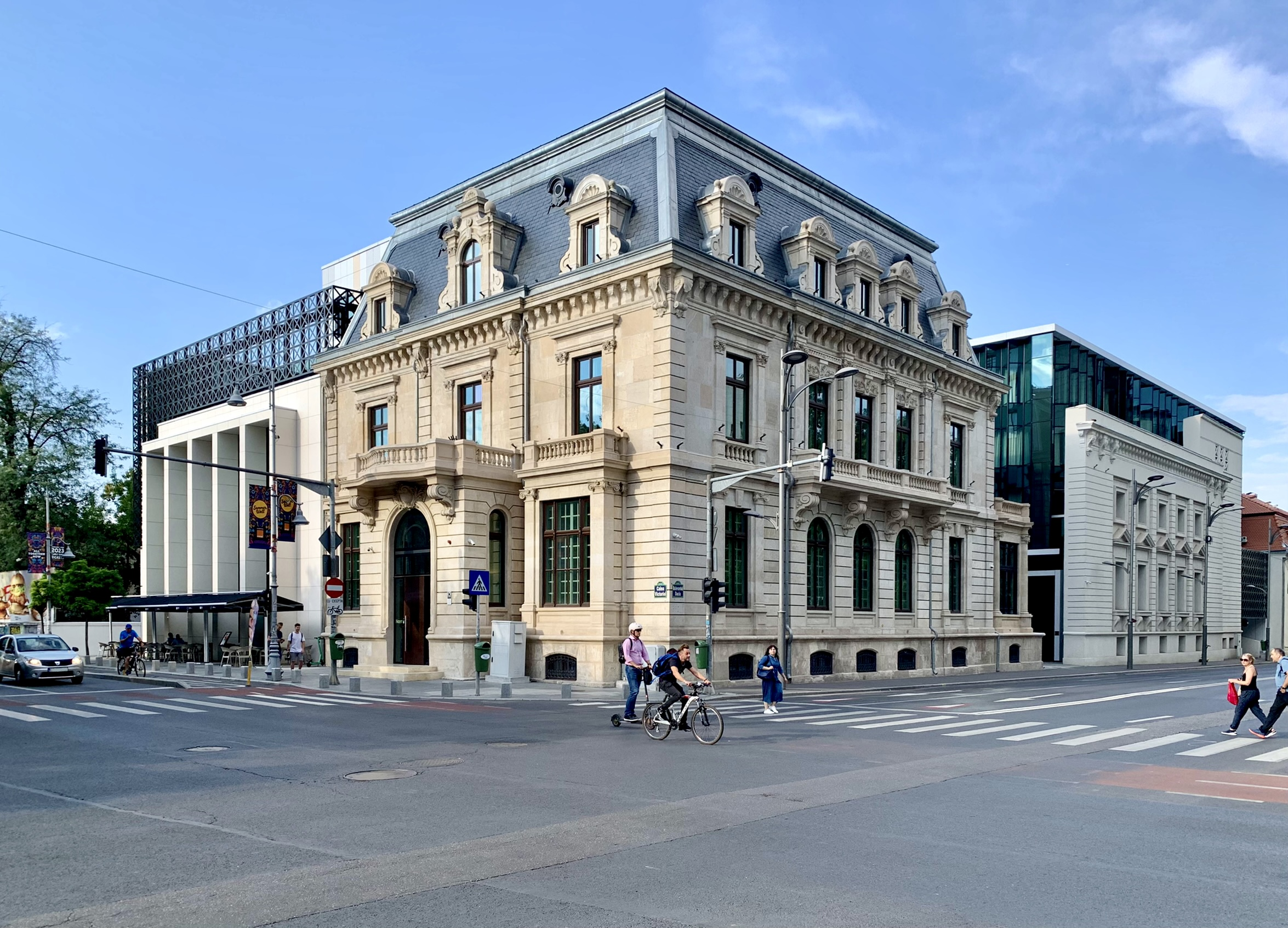
Modifications - Dimitrie Cesianu House (Calea Victoriei no. 174), the former German legation/embassy on Calea Victoriei, Bucharest, renovated and changed thought the adding of new structures during the late 2010s-2021

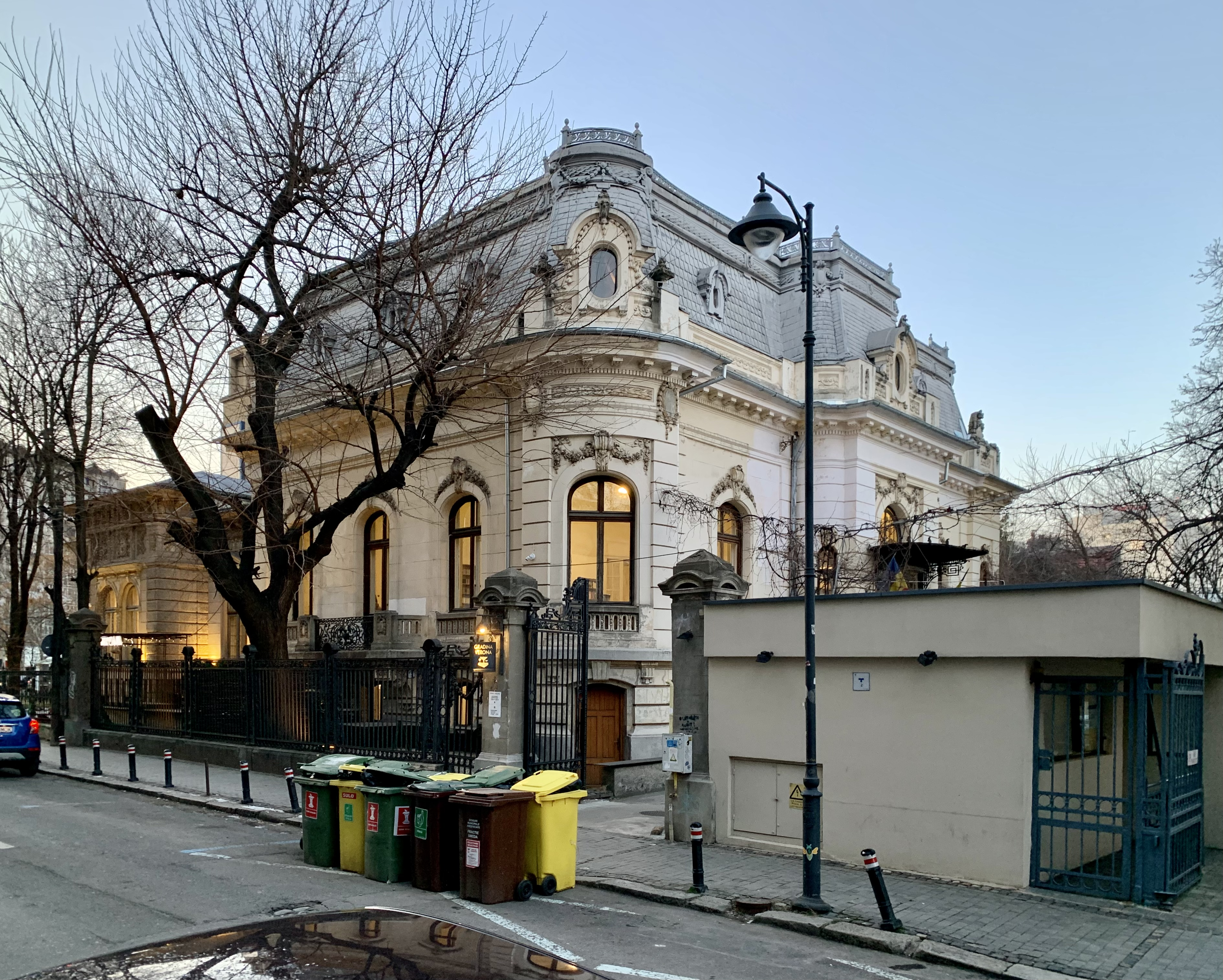
Reconversions - Strada Arthur Verona no. 15, Bucharest. Together with the Dimitrie Sturdza House, they form the Cărturești Verona bookshop, thus being put in value with the change of their initial residential function

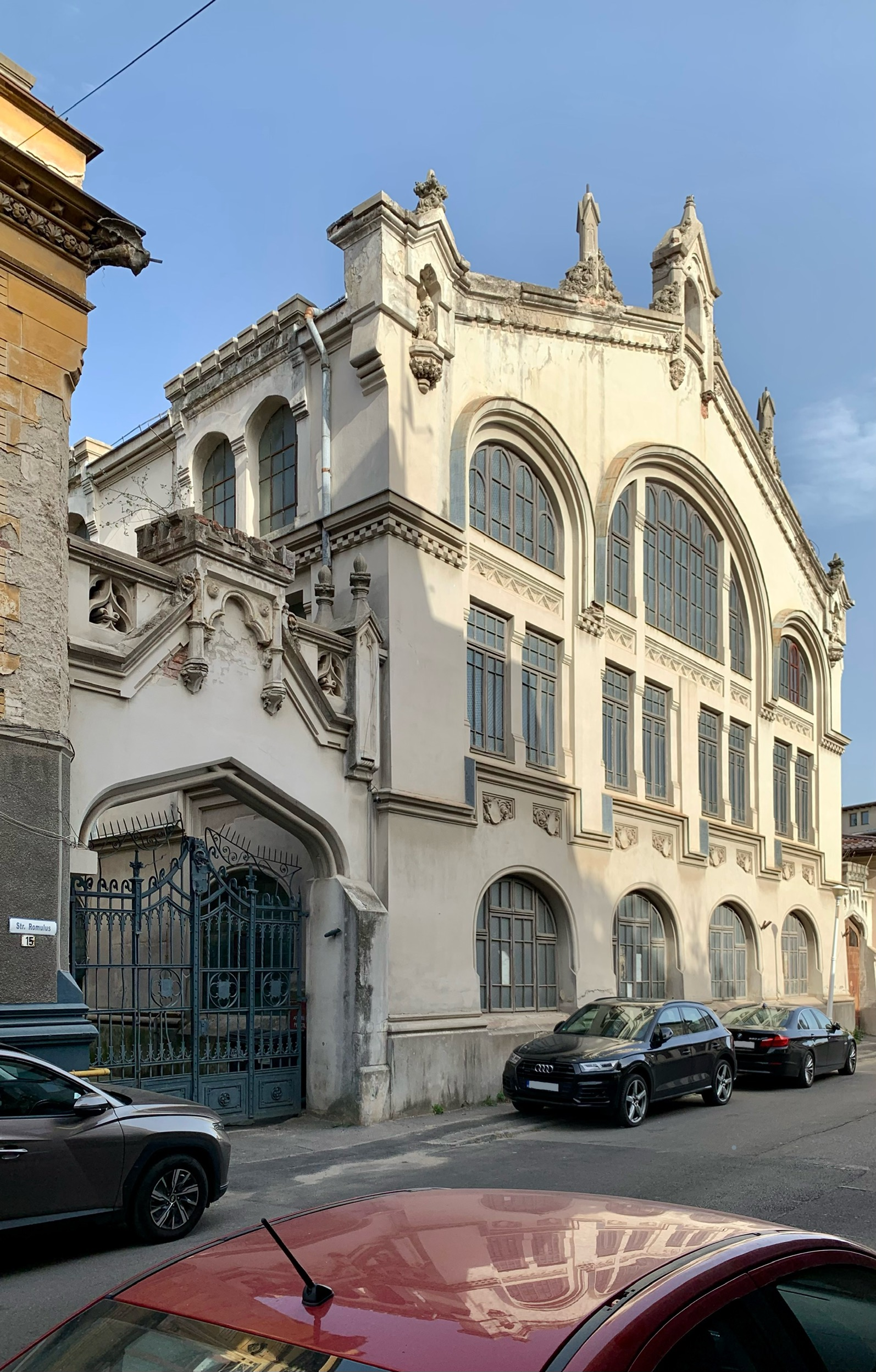
Good preservations - Hermann I. Rieber carriage factory, Bucharest, a gem of the Belle Époque, that despite not being renovated in recent years, is still in a good condition

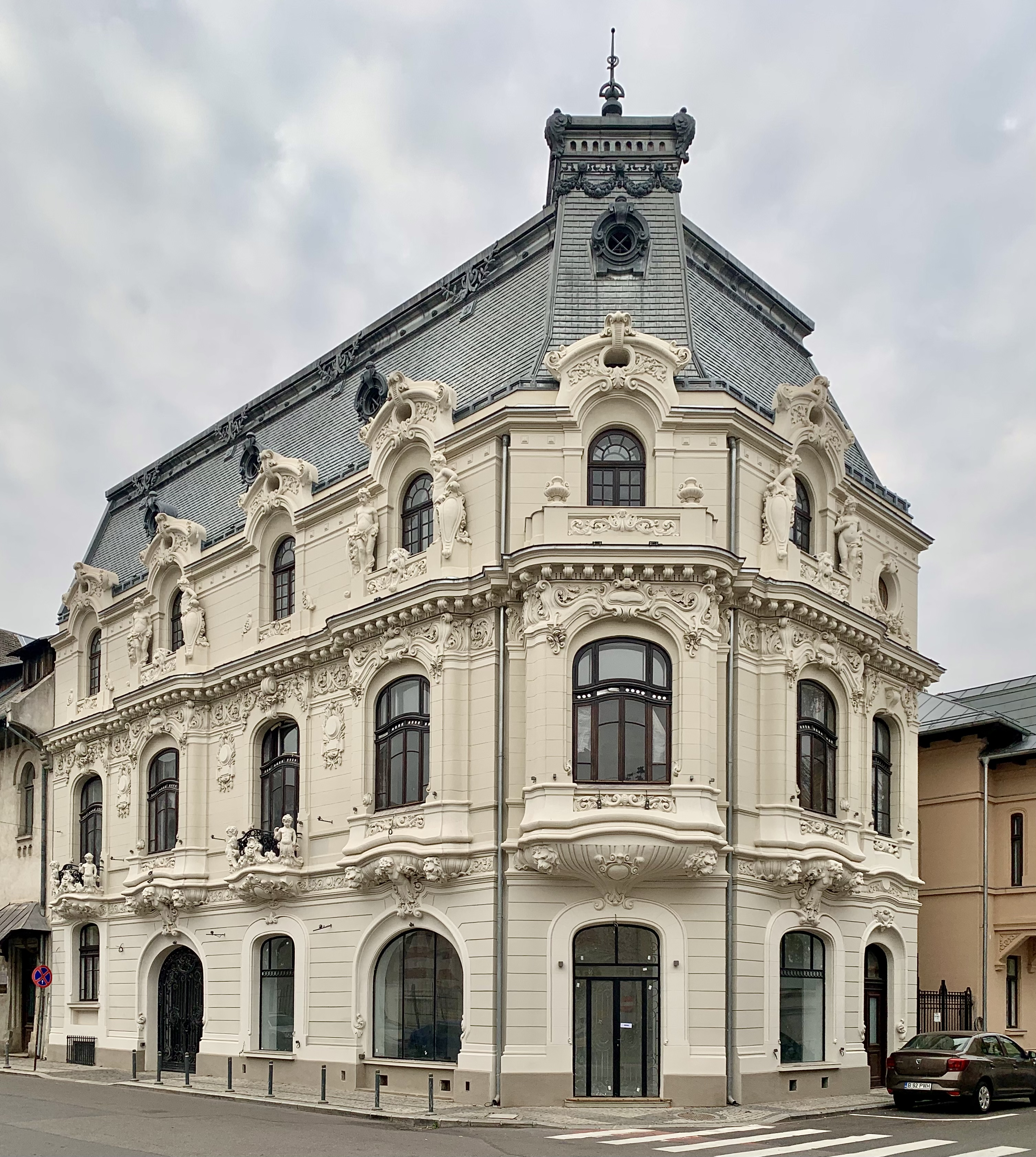
Good renovations and restorations - Mița the Cyclist House, Bucharest, a Belle Époque house from the 1900s, in a state of decay before the mid-2010s, restored and brought to its former glory

== See also ==
- Wooden churches of Maramureș
- List of Romanian architects
- List of buildings in Bucharest
