= Romanian Americans =

Ethnic groups in the United States

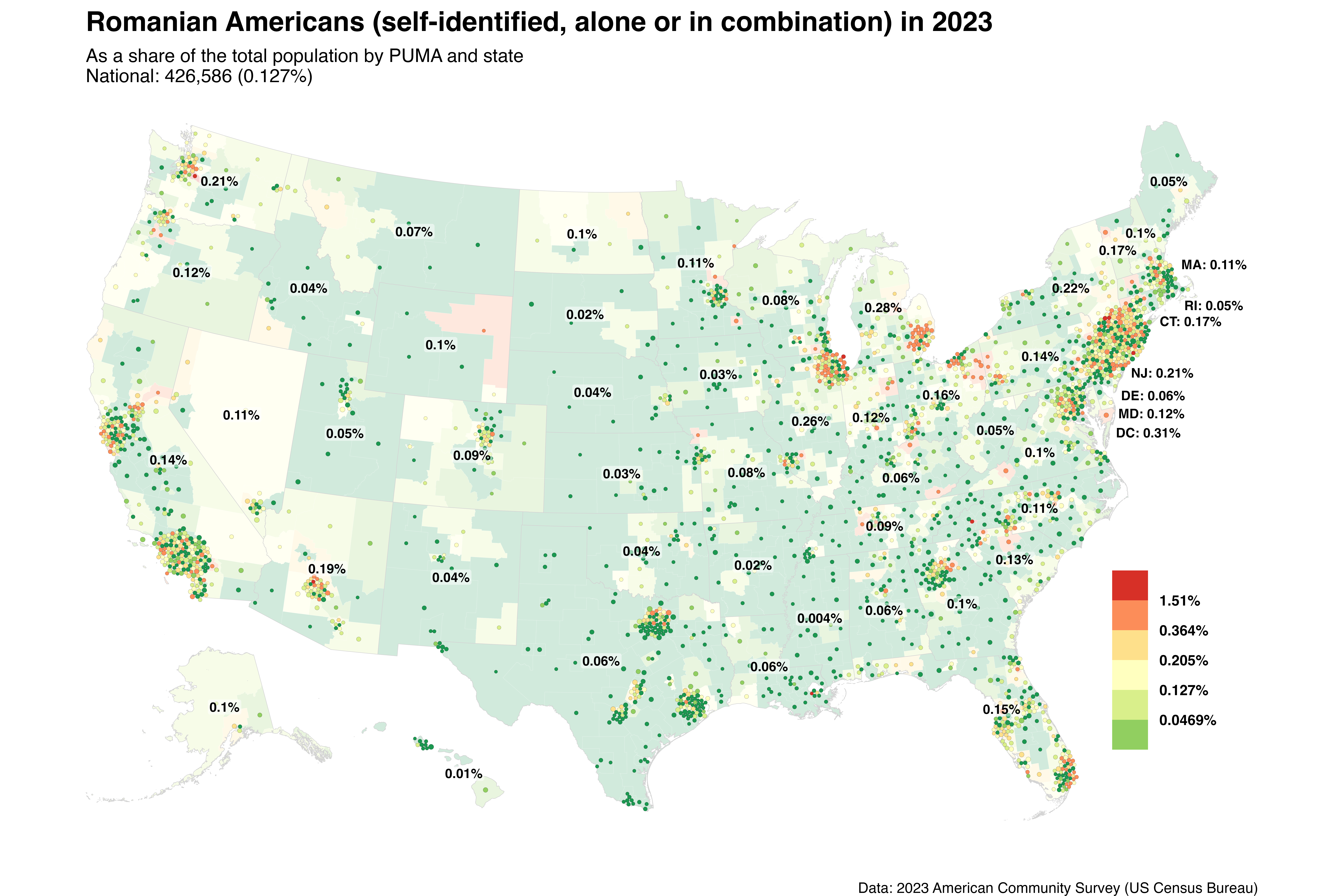

Total population
- 425,738 (0.15% of U.S. population); (2023 Official U.S. Census count)

Regions with significant populations
- New York City Metropolitan Area; New Jersey; Greater Los Angeles; Greater Chicago; Metro Detroit; Greater Phoenix; Cleveland, Ohio; Indianapolis, Indiana; Greater Atlanta; Broward County, Florida; Sacramento County; Portland, Oregon

Languages
- American English; Romanian

Religion
- Predominantly Romanian Orthodoxy, Romanian Greek Catholicism, Roman Catholicism, Judaism and smaller Protestantism

Related ethnic groups
- Romanian Canadians, European Americans, Moldovan Americans, Italian Americans, French Americans

The language spread of Romanian in the United States according to U. S. Census 2000

Romanian Americans (Romanian: români americani) are Americans who have Romanian ancestry. According to the 2023 American Community Survey, 425,738 Americans indicated Romanian as their first or second ancestry, however other sources provide higher estimates, which are most likely more accurate, for the numbers of Romanian Americans in the contemporary United States; for example, the Romanian-American Network supplies a rough estimate of 1.2 million who are fully or partially of Romanian ethnicity. There is also a significant number of people of Romanian Jewish ancestry, estimated at 250,000.

== History ==
The first Romanian known to have been to what is now the United States was Samuel Damian (also spelled Domien), a former Greek Catholic priest. Samuel Damian's name appears as far back as 1748, when he placed an advertisement in the South Carolina Gazette announcing the electrical demonstrations he planned to give and inviting the public to attend. Letters written in 1753 and 1755 by Benjamin Franklin attest to the fact that the two had met and had carried on discussions concerning electricity. Damian remained in the States for some years and lived in South Carolina, before traveling on to Jamaica.

There were several Romanians who became officers in the Union Army during the American Civil War, including Brevet Brigadier General George Pomutz, commander of the 15th Iowa Infantry Regiment, Captain Nicolae Dunca, who fought and died in the Battle of Cross Keys, and Captain Eugen Ghica-Comănești, of the 5th New York Volunteer Infantry. There were also several Romanian-American soldiers who fought in the Spanish–American War in 1898.

The first major wave of Romanian immigration to the United States took place between 1895 and 1920, in which 145,000 Romanians entered the country. They came from various regions such as Moldavia, Bukovina, Transylvania and Banat, as well as neighboring countries such as Ukraine and Serbia which had significant ethnic Romanian populations. The majority of these immigrants, particularly those from Transylvania and Banat that were under Austro-Hungarian rule, left their native regions because of economic depression and forced assimilation, namely magyarization, a policy practiced by Hungarian rulers.

They settled mostly in industrial centers in Pennsylvania and Delaware, as well as in the areas around the Great Lakes such as Cleveland, Chicago, and Detroit. The migrants from the Romanian Old Kingdom were mostly Jews, most of whom settled in New York City. One of their prominent organizations was the United Rumanian Jews of America. 75,000 Romanian Jews emigrated in the period between 1881–1914, mostly to the United States.

During the interwar period, the number of ethnic Romanians who migrated to the U.S. decreased as a consequence of economic development in Romania, but the overall number of Jews who migrated to the U.S. increased, mostly after the rise of fascism.

After World War II, the number of Romanians who migrated to the United States increased again. This time, they settled mostly in California, Florida and New York, coming from all throughout Romania. After the Fall of Communism in 1989, increased numbers of Romanians moved to the United States, taking advantage of the new relaxation of Romania's emigration policies. During communist rule, the borders had been officially closed, although some people managed to immigrate, including to the United States. In the 1990s, New York City and Los Angeles were some of the favorite destinations for Romanian emigrants.

Romanian Roma also came to the United States.

== Distribution ==
Romanian Americans are distributed throughout the U.S., with concentrations found in the Midwest, such as in the states of Michigan, Ohio, and Illinois; the Northeast, in New York, Pennsylvania and Delaware, as well as California (Los Angeles and Sacramento). In the Southeast, communities are found in Georgia (Metro Atlanta), Florida (South Florida) and Alabama (Montgomery). There are also significant communities in the Southwestern U.S., such as in Arizona. The largest Romanian American community is in the state of New York.

Map of North America highlighting the OCA Romanian Episcopate

The states with the largest estimated Romanian American populations are:

1. New York (161,900)
2. California (128,133)
3. Florida (121,015)
4. Michigan (119,624)
5. Pennsylvania (114,529)
6. Illinois (106,017)
7. Ohio (83,228)
8. Georgia (47,689)

=== Romanian-born population ===
According to estimates from the American Community Survey for 2017-2021, there were 166,700 Romanian immigrants nationally, the top counties of which were:

1. Cook County, Illinois (11,600)
2. Queens Borough, NYC, N.Y. (7,100)
3. Los Angeles County, California (6,100)
4. Maricopa County, Arizona (5,400)
5. Orange County, California (4,400)
6. King County, Washington (4,100)
7. Manhattan Borough, NYC, N.Y. (3,800)
8. Gwinnett County, Georgia (3,700)
9. Broward County, Florida (3,600)
10. Cuyahoga County, Ohio (3,100)
11. Oakland County, Michigan (2,700)
12. Brooklyn Borough, NYC, N.Y. (2,600)
13. Palm Beach County, Florida (2,400)
14. Wayne County, Michigan (2,300)
15. Sacramento County, California (2,300)

Romanian-born population in the U.S. since 2010:

Year	Number
2010	151,767
2011	▲164,606
2012	▲165,819
2013	▼157,302
2014	▲157,315
2015	▲159,546
2016	▲161,629
2017	▲165,199
2018	▼162,443
2019	▲167,751
2020	▼163,817
2021	▲166,674
2022	▼164,406
2023	▼160,205

== Romania-U.S. relations ==
The United States established diplomatic relations with Romania in 1880, following Romania's independence. The two countries severed diplomatic ties after Romania declared war on the United States in 1941; and re-established them in 1947. Relations remained strained during the Cold War era while Romania was under communist leadership. Cold and strained during the early post-war period, U.S. bilateral relations with Romania began to improve in the early 1960s with the signing of an agreement providing for partial settlement of American property claims. Cultural, scientific, and educational exchanges were initiated, and in 1964 the legations of both nations were promoted to full embassies. In March 2005, President Traian Băsescu made his first official visit to Washington to meet with President Bush, Secretary of State Condoleezza Rice, Secretary of Defense Donald Rumsfeld, and other senior U.S. officials. In December 2005, Secretary Rice visited Bucharest to meet with President Băsescu and to sign a bilateral defense cooperation agreement that would allow for the joint use of Romanian military facilities by U.S. troops. The first proof of principle exercise took place at Mihail Kogălniceanu Air Base from August to October 2007.

== Romanian American culture ==
Romanian culture has merged with American culture, characterized by Romanian-born Americans adopting American culture or American-born people having strong Romanian heritage.

The Romanian culture can be seen in many different kinds, like Romanian music, newspapers, churches, cultural organizations and groups, such as the Romanian-American Congress or the Round Table Society NFP. Religion, predominantly within the Romanian Orthodox Church and the Romanian Greek Catholic Church, is an important trace of the Romanian presence in the United States, with churches in almost all bigger cities throughout the country.

In certain areas of the U.S., Romanian communities were first established several generations ago (in the late 19th century and early 20th century) such as in the Great Lakes region; while in others, such as California and Florida, Romanian communities are formed especially by Romanians who emigrated more recently, into the late 20th century and early 21st century. After 1989, large numbers of Romanians emigrated to New York and Los Angeles.

One of the best known foods of Romanian origin is Pastrama. Ingredients used by Romanian Americans are cabbage, eggplant, potatoes, rice, and corn meal used to make mămăligă. Romanian Americans also use proteins such as chicken, beef, pork as well as eggs, cheeses and dairy products. Romanian Americans are also fond of cured meats. Romanian Americans serve cabbage rolls for the holidays.

== Romanian-American Chamber Commerce ==
The Romanian-American Chamber of Commerce is a bilateral trade and investment organization that promotes commerce and investment between Romania and United States, and is headquartered in Washington D.C. The Chamber is composed of both Romanian and American businesses and has active chapters in New York, Washington, D.C., Florida, California and the Mid-West. It was founded in February 1990 and is celebrating its 20th year of activity in 2010. The RACC conducts a broad range of events, activities, and services and is a member organization of the Bi-National European Chambers of Commerce of the United States, which includes most of the bilateral chambers of the major EU member states.

== Gallery ==
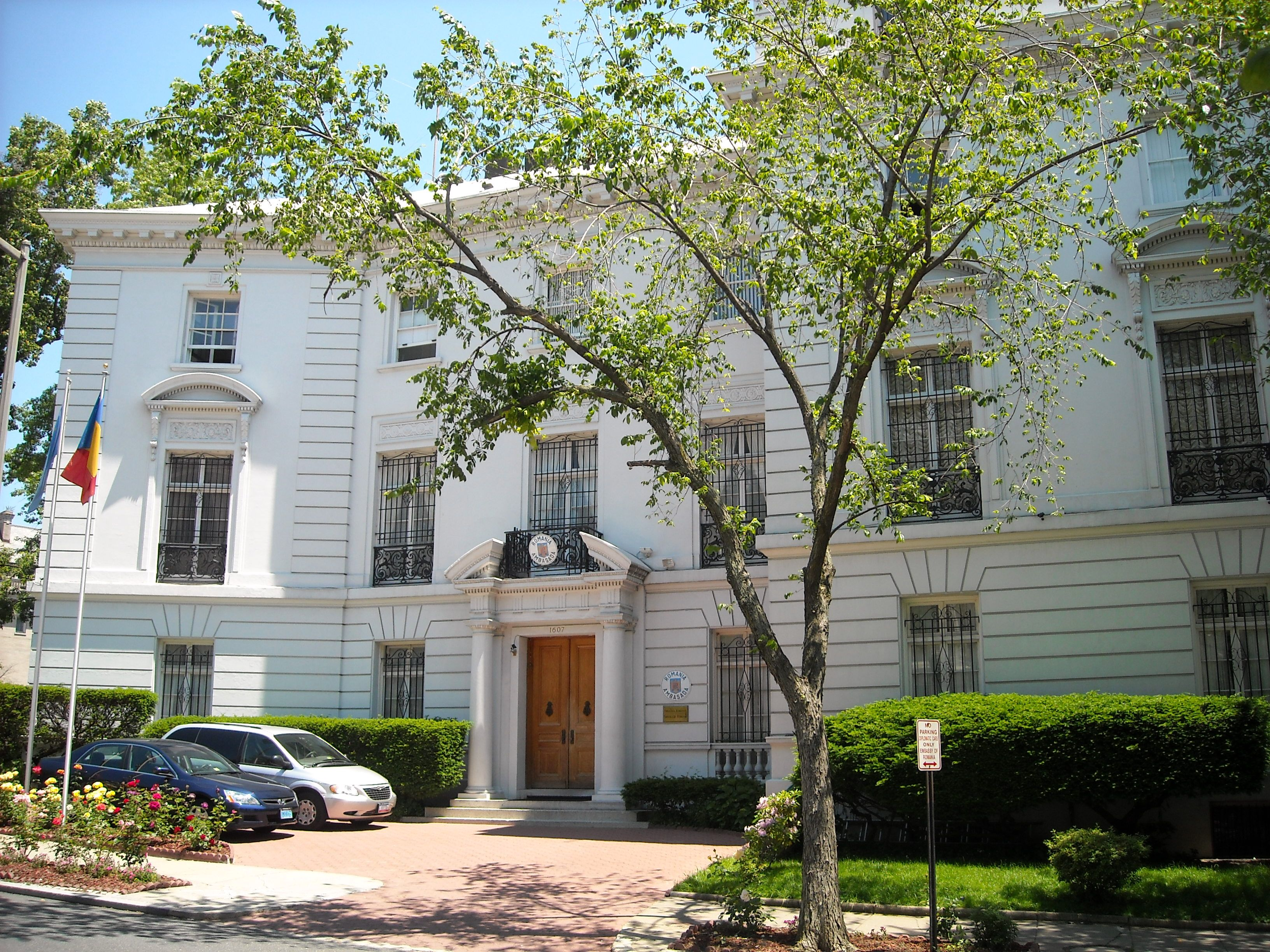
The Embassy of Romania located in Washington, D.C.

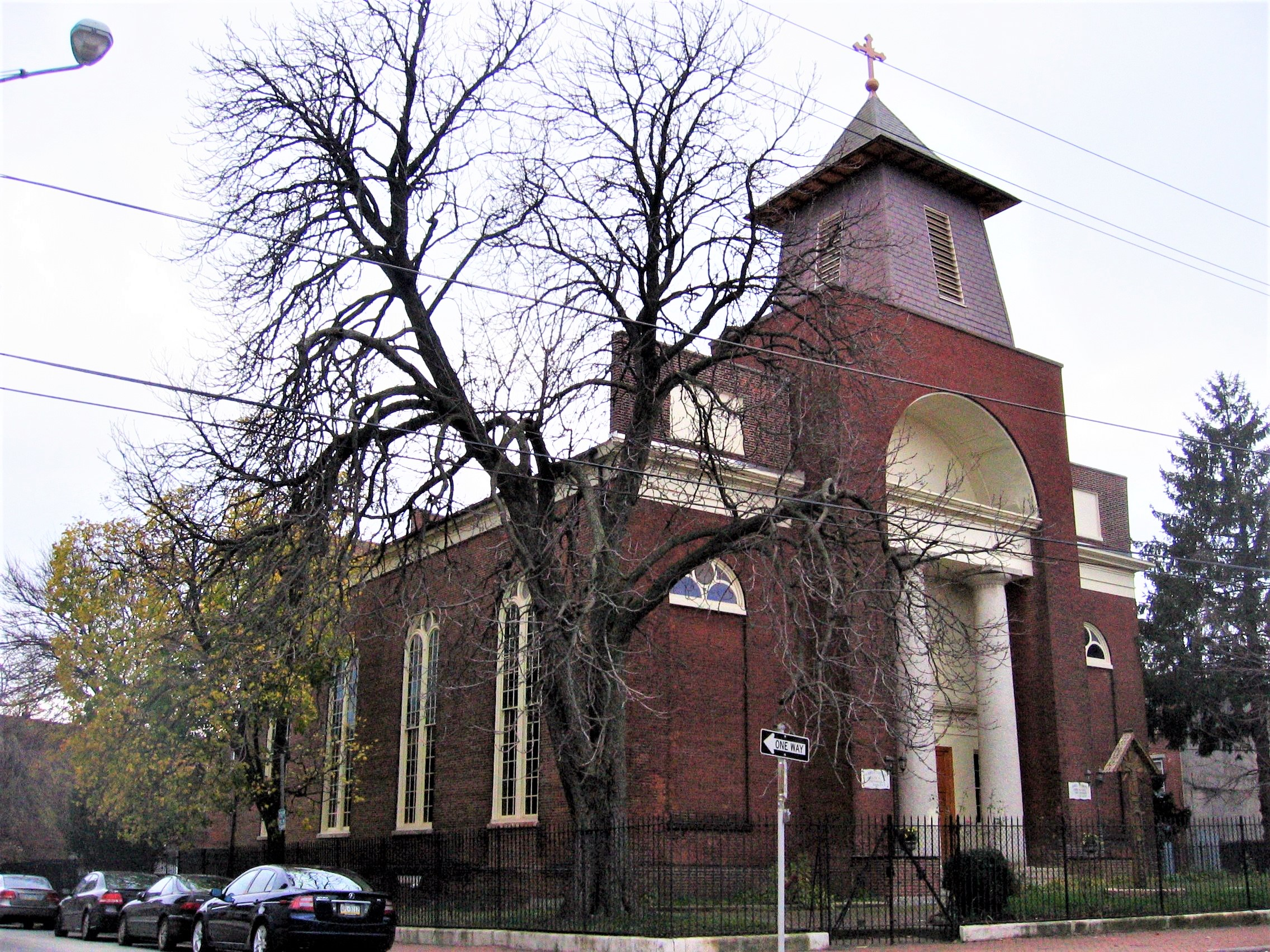
St. John's Church, Philadelphia

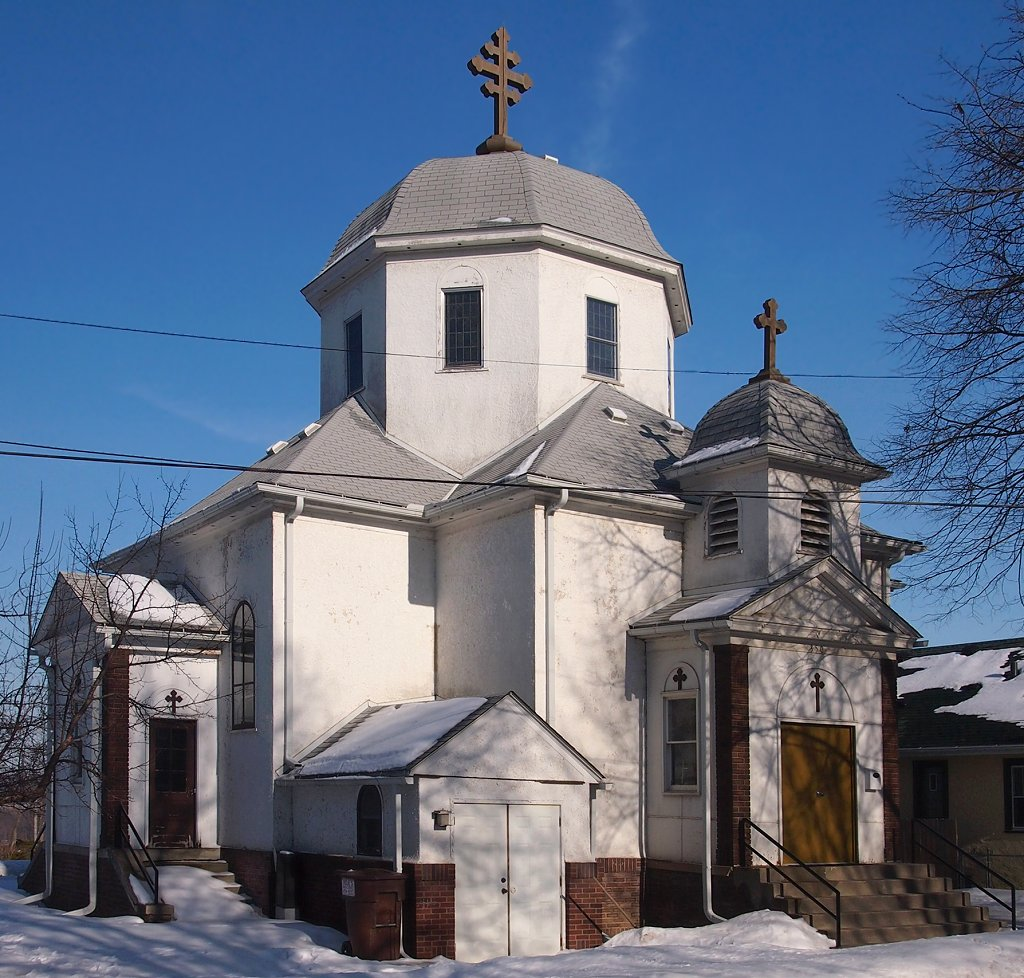
St. Stefan's Romanian Orthodox Church in South St. Paul, Minnesota

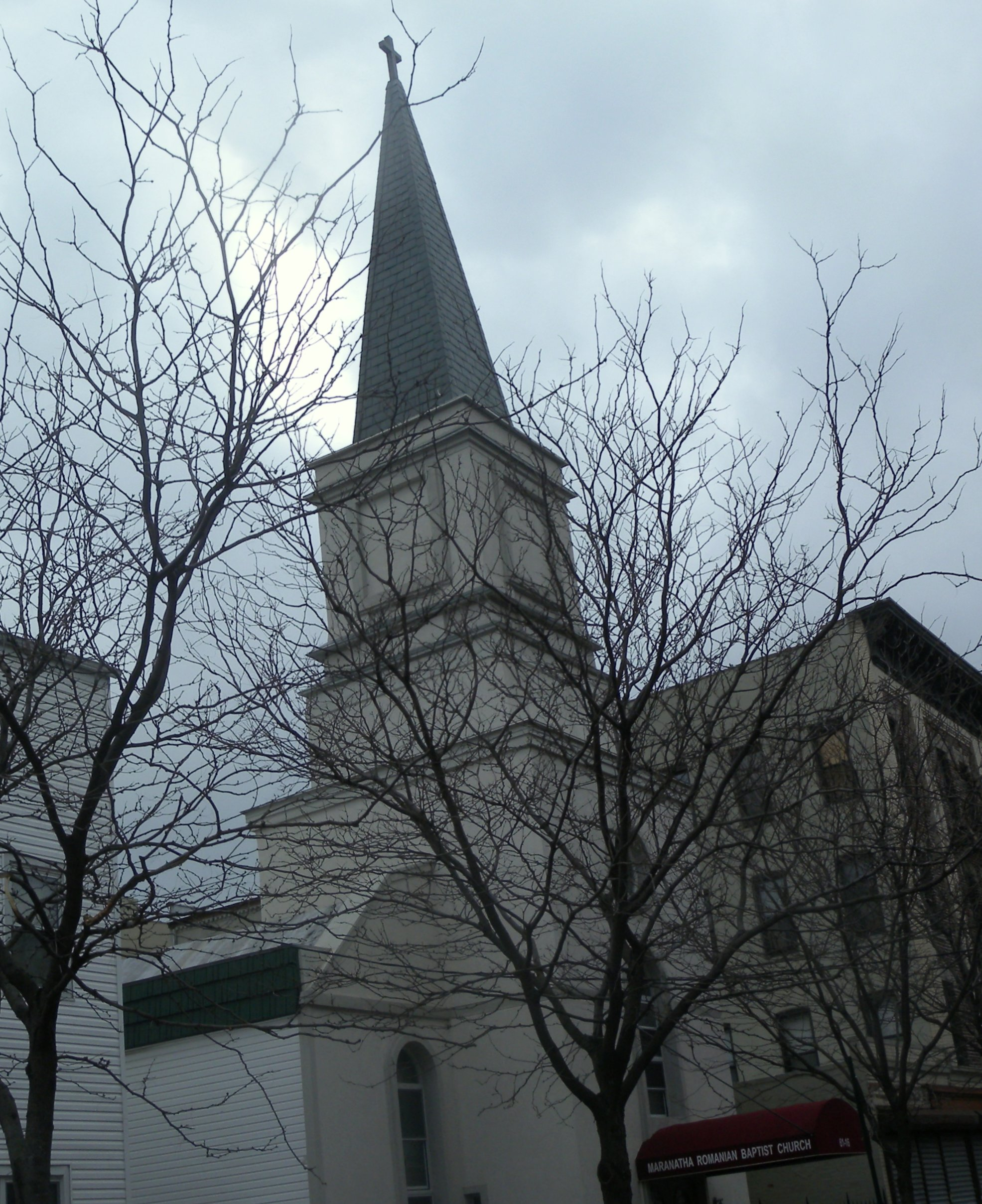
The Maranatha Baptist Church in New York

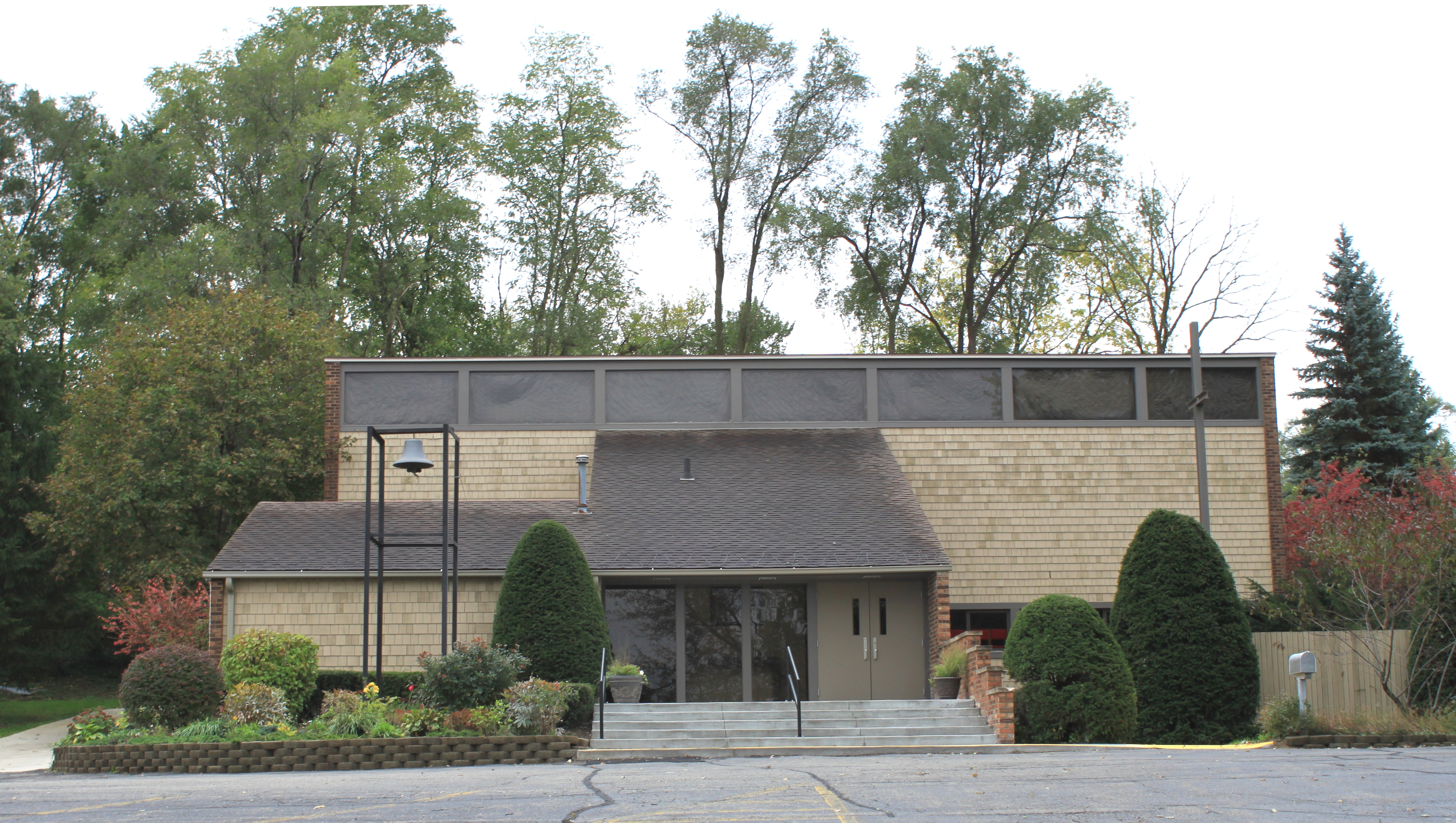
The Grace Romanian Pentecostal Church in Ypsilanti Township, Michigan

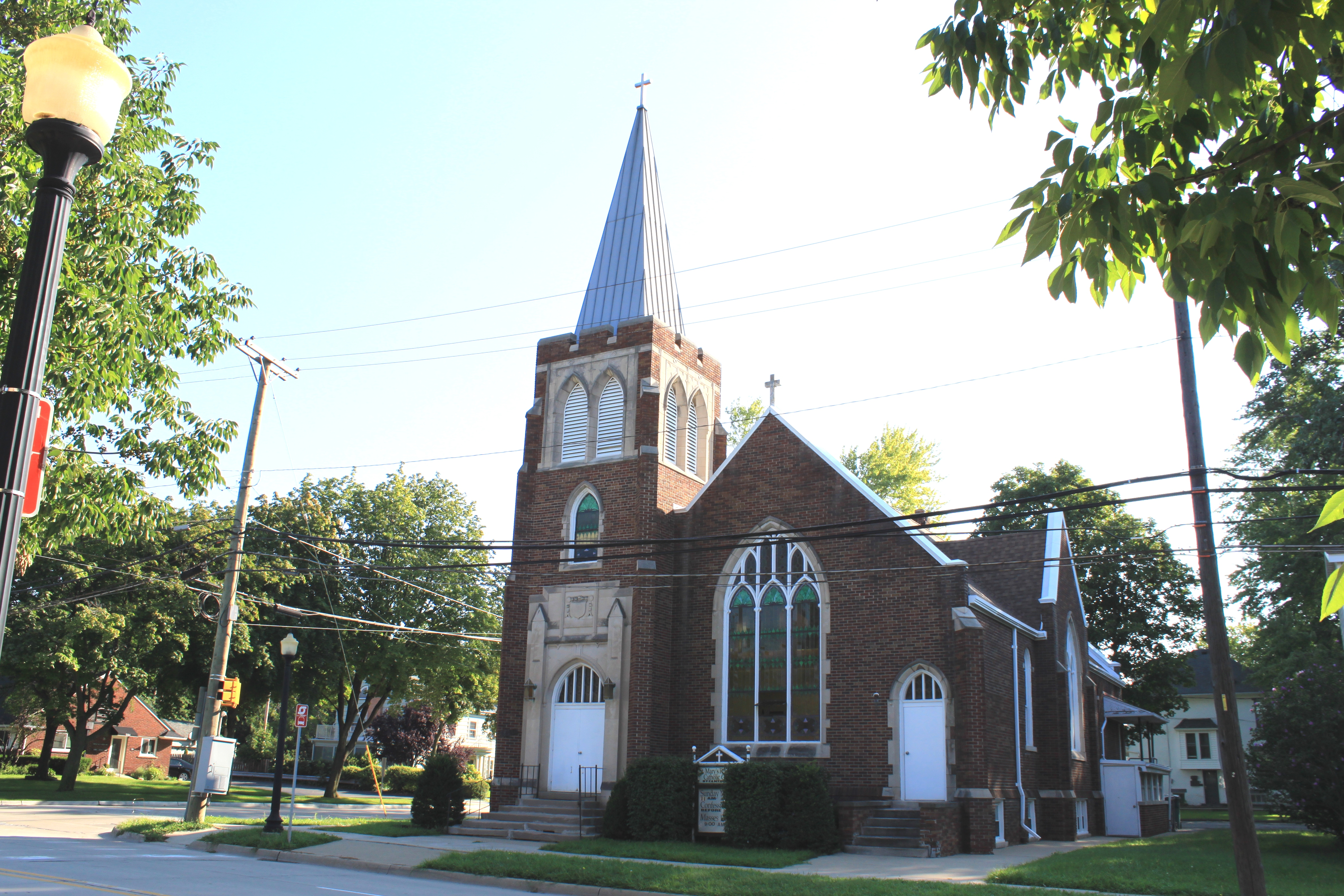
St. Mary's Romanian Byzantine Catholic Church in Dearborn, Michigan

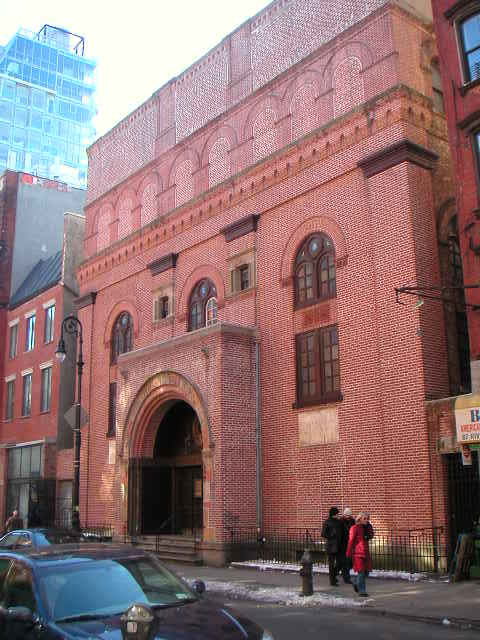
The First Roumanian-American Congregation on the Lower East Side of Manhattan

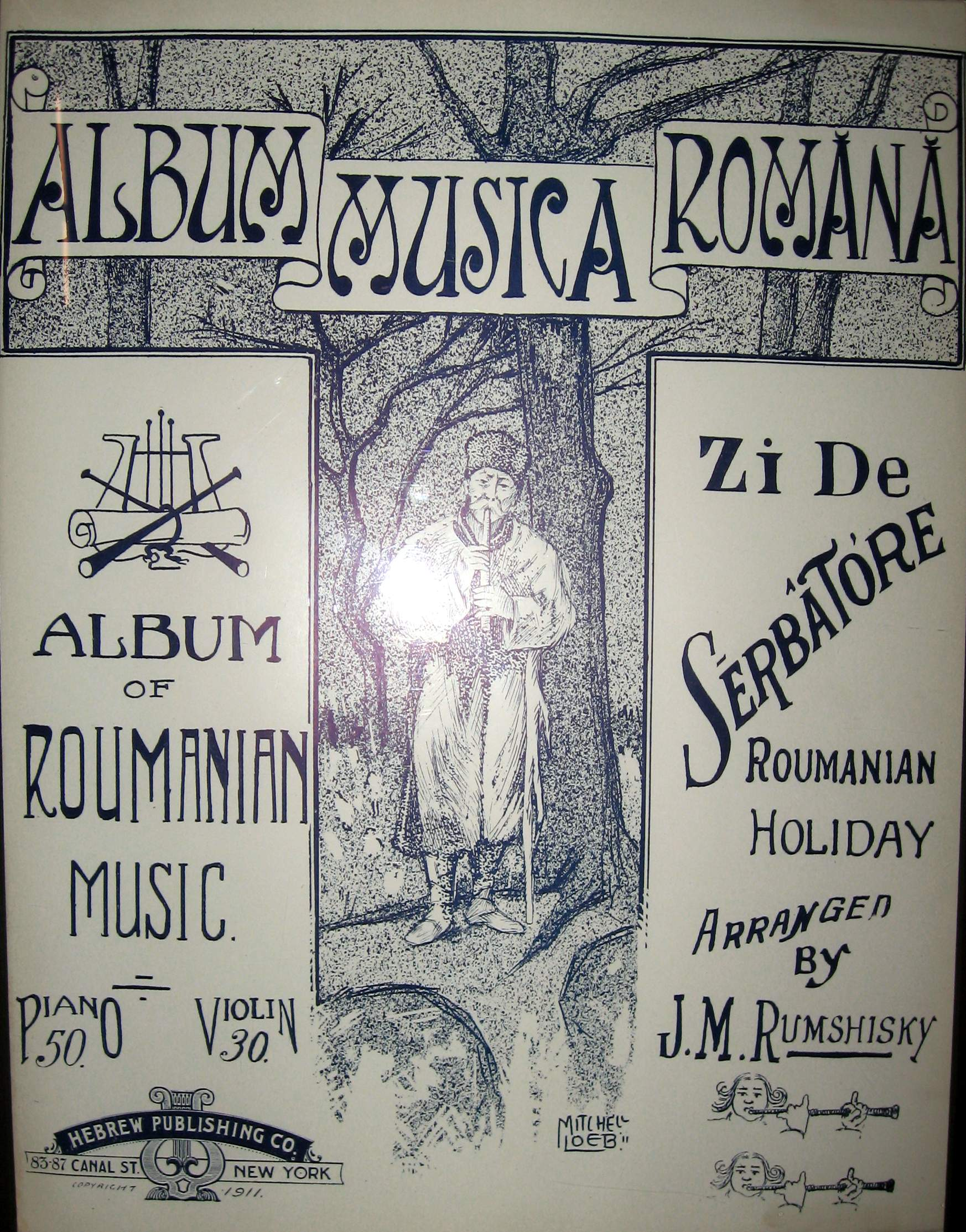
An album of Romanian music issued by Romanian Jewish immigrants in New York at the beginning of the 20th century

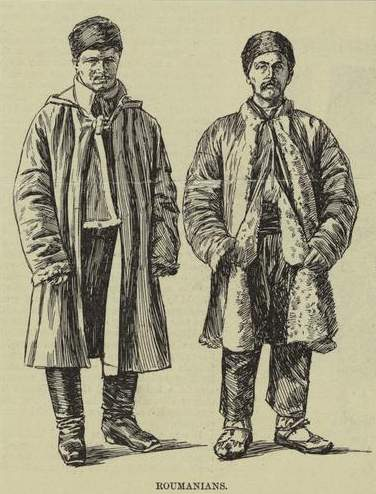
Romanian immigrants in New York City (1891)

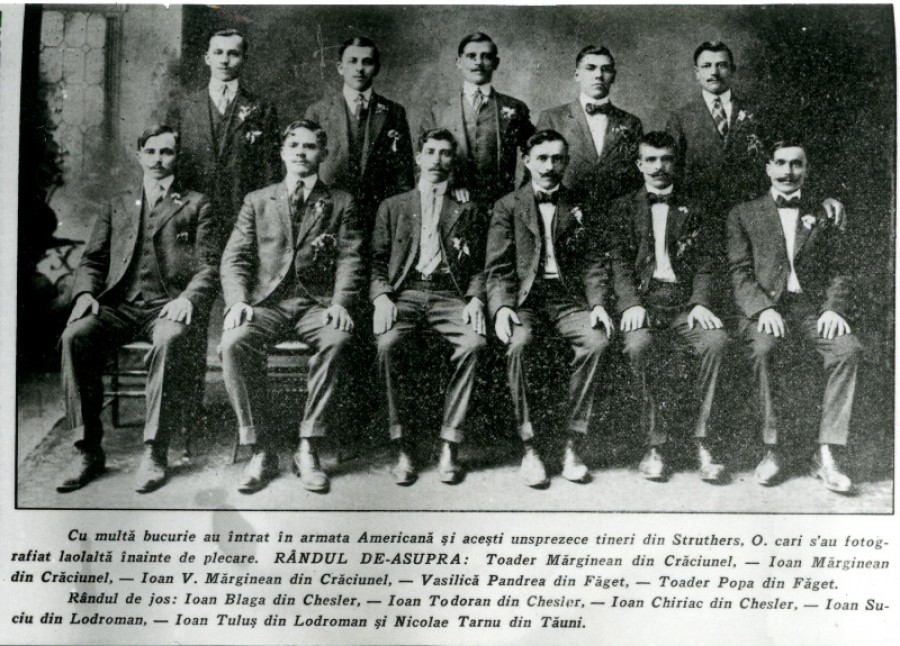
Romanian volunteers from Struthers, Ohio in the United States Army (1918)

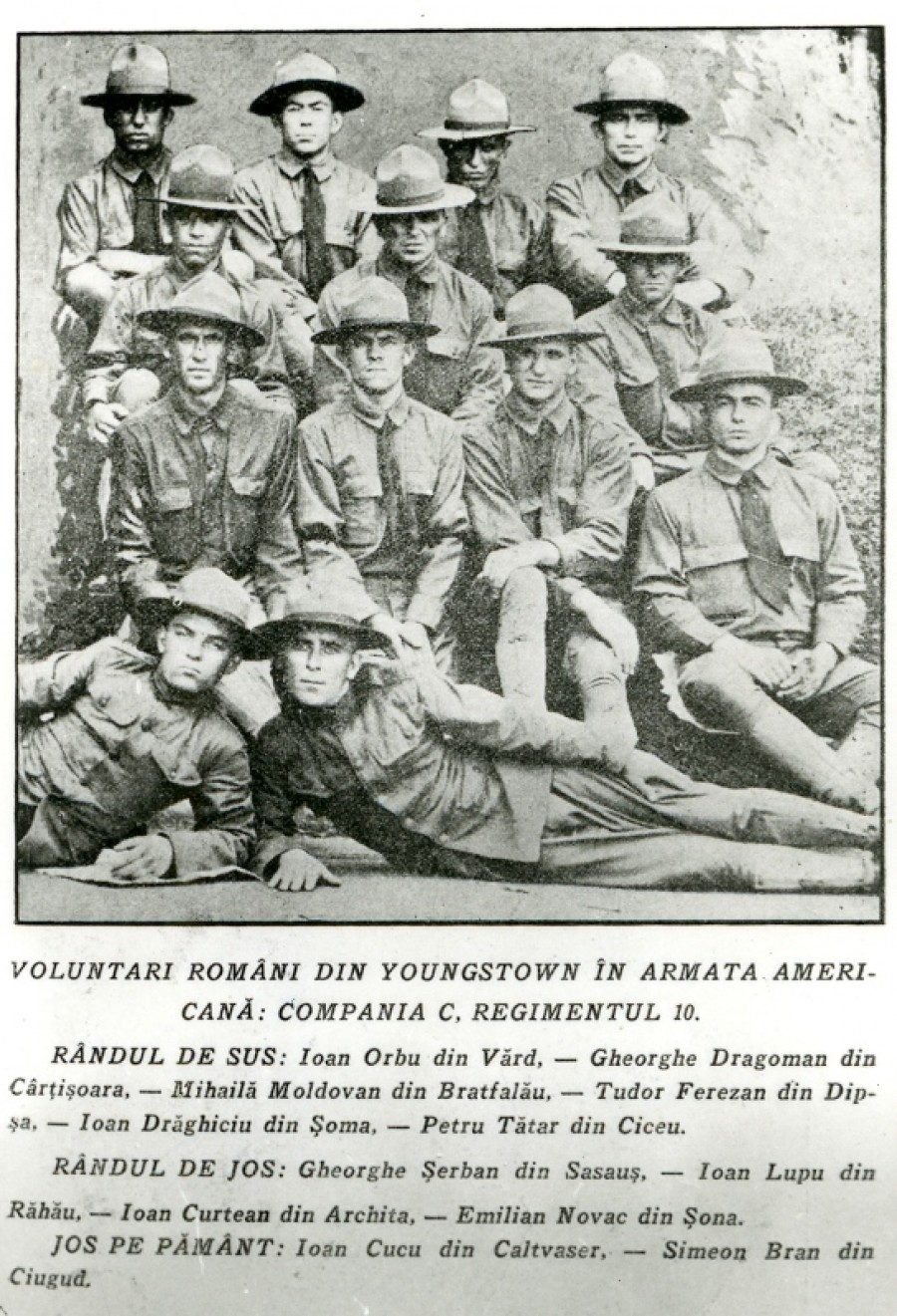
Romanian volunteers from Youngstown, Ohio in the U.S. Army (1918)

== Notable people ==
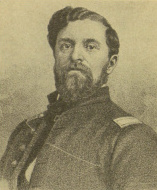
George Pomutz

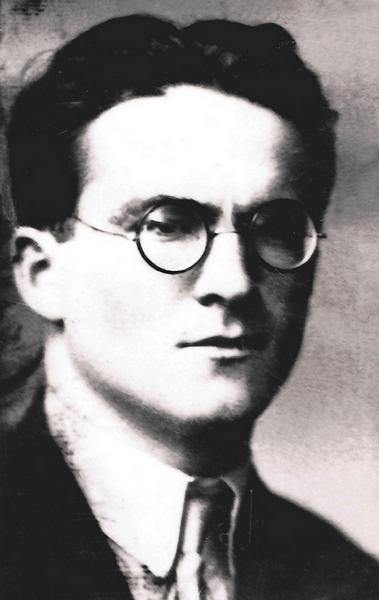
Mircea Eliade

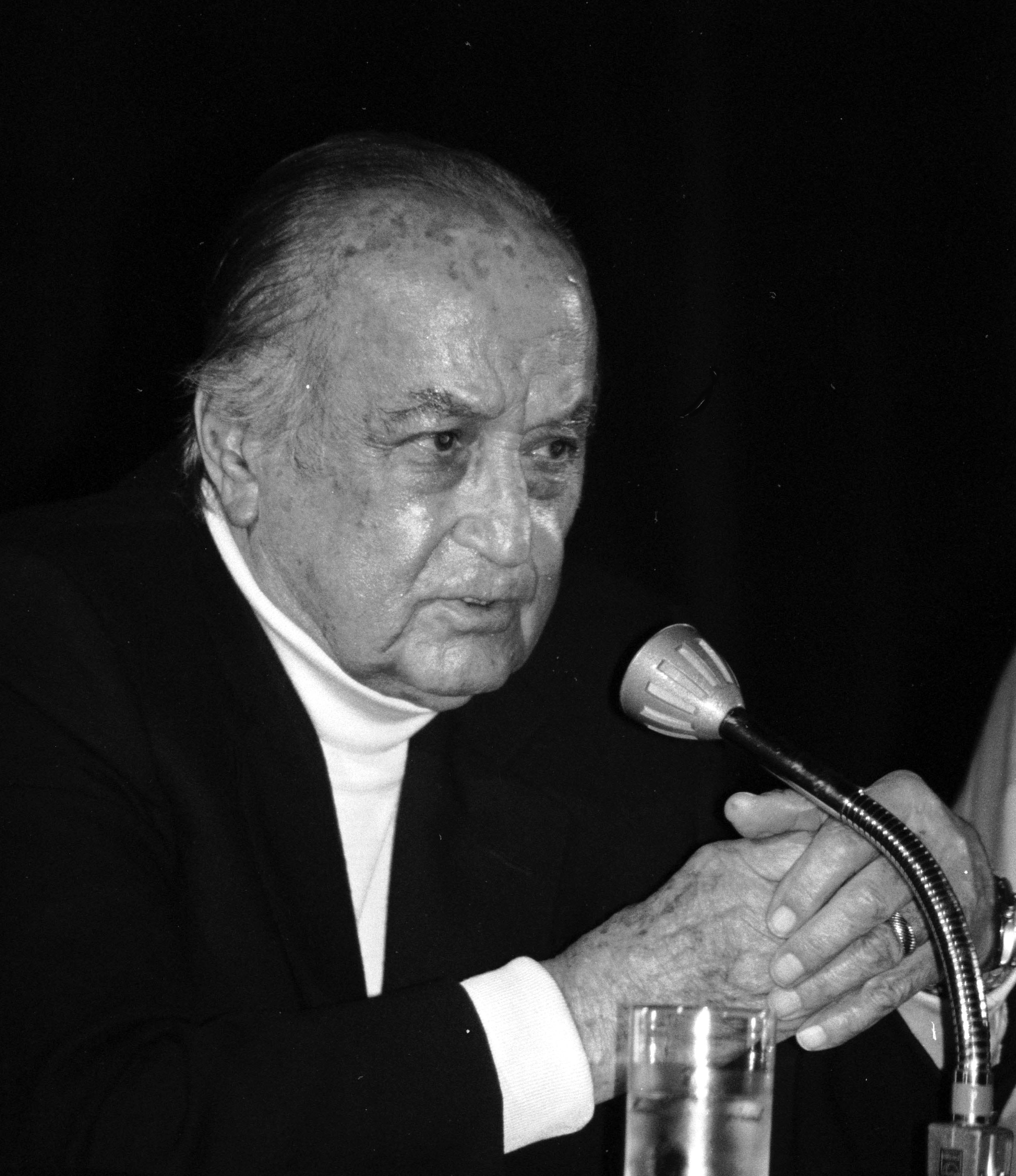
Jean Negulescu

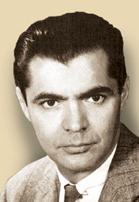
George Palade

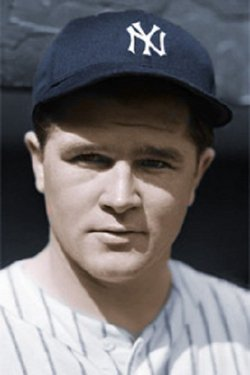
Charley Stanceu

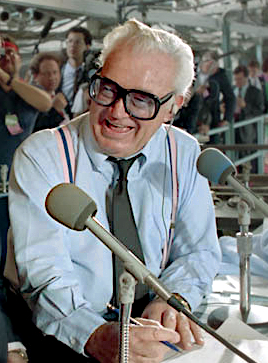
Harry Caray

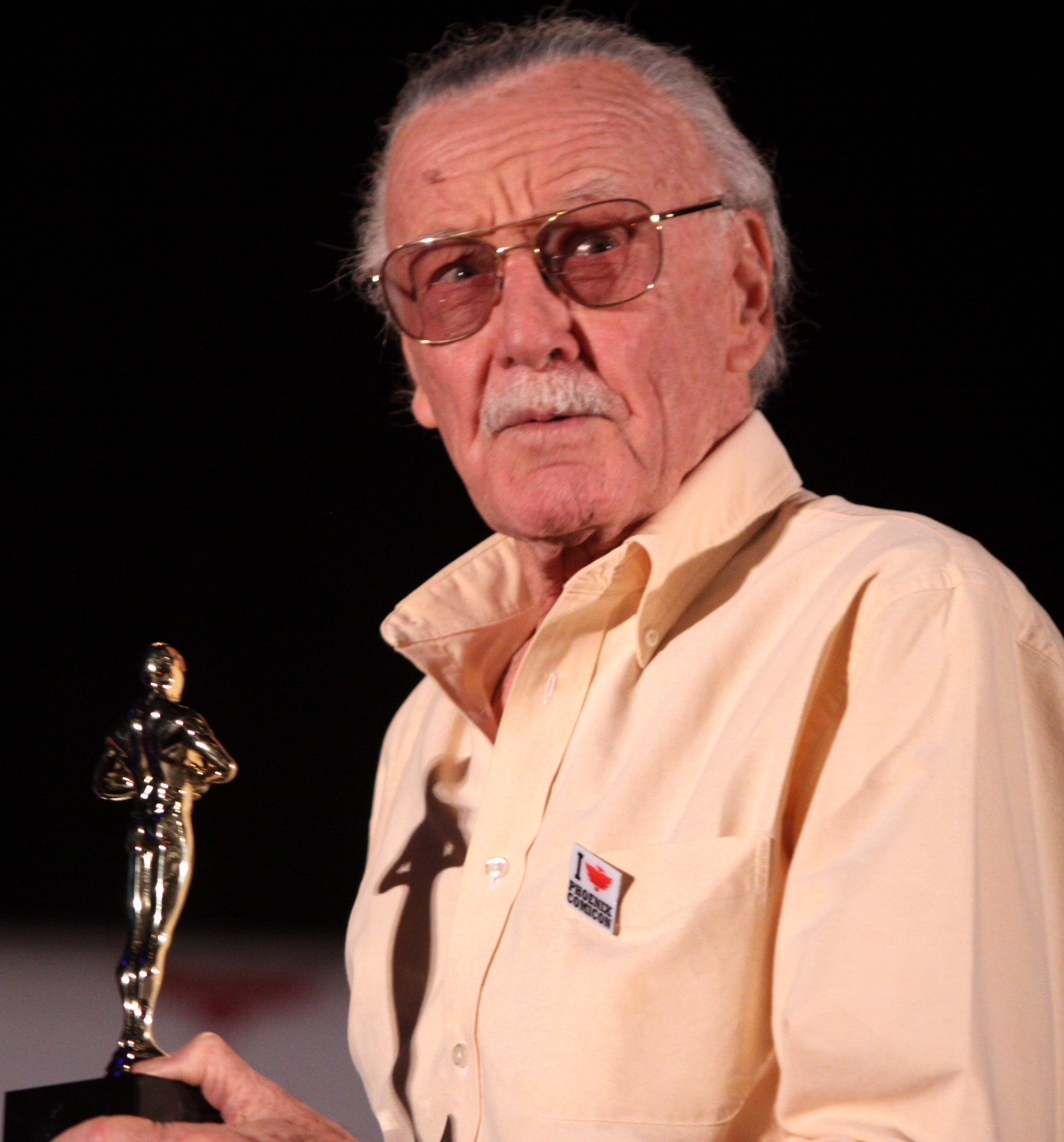
Stan Lee

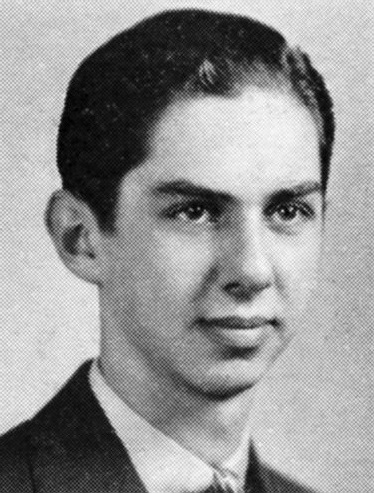
John DeLorean

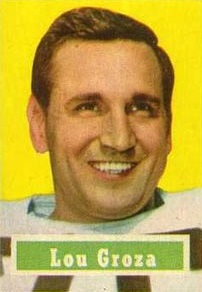
Lou Groza

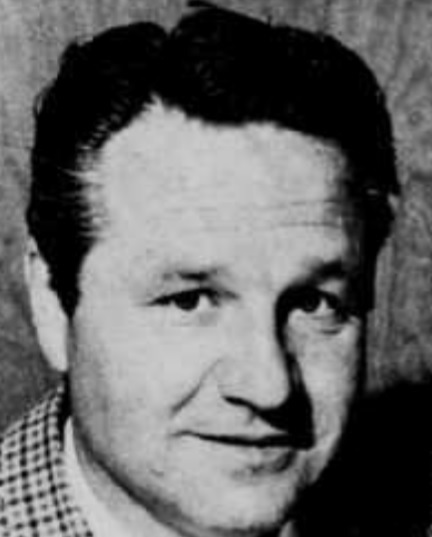
Stephen Negoesco

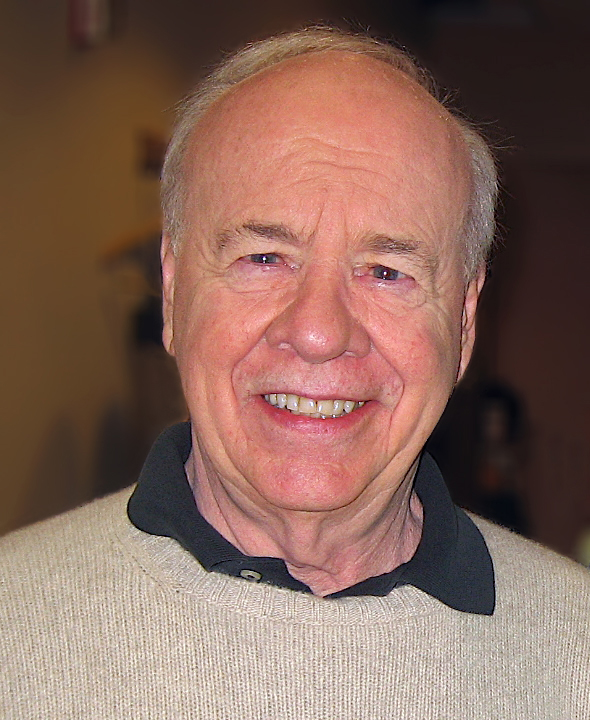
Tim Conway

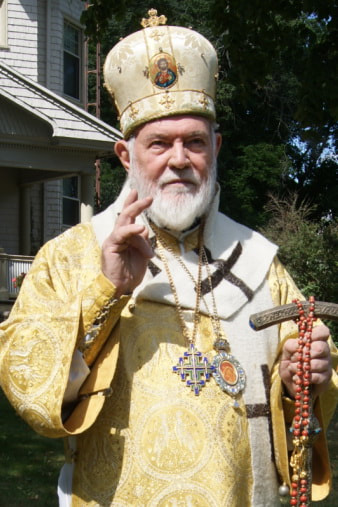
Nathaniel Popp

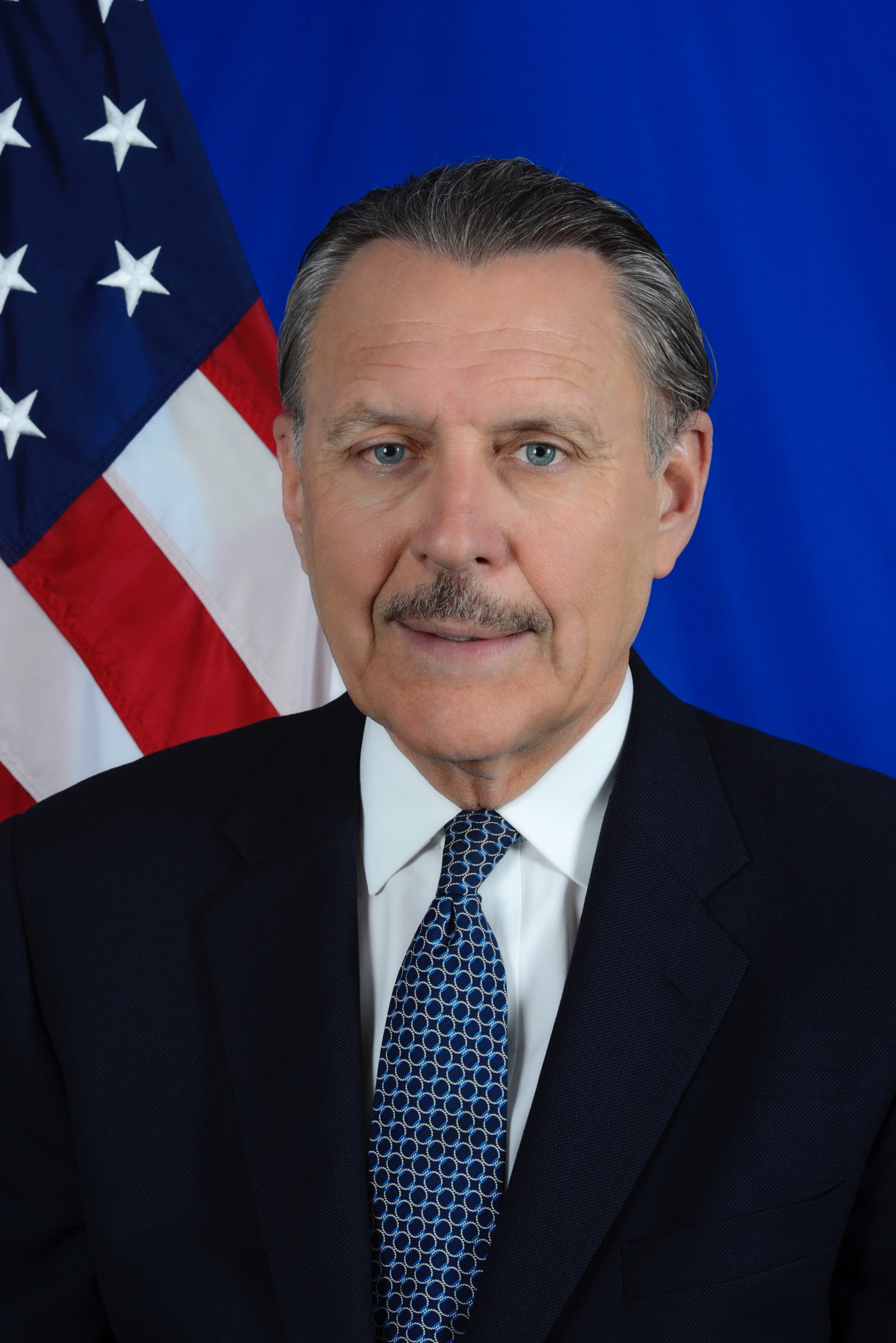
John Rakolta

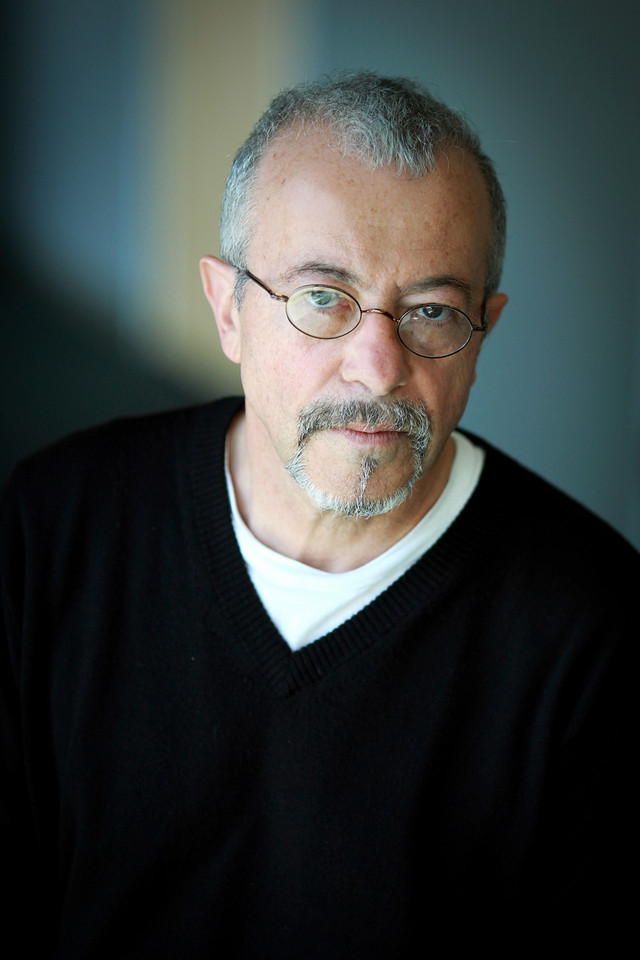
Andrei Codrescu

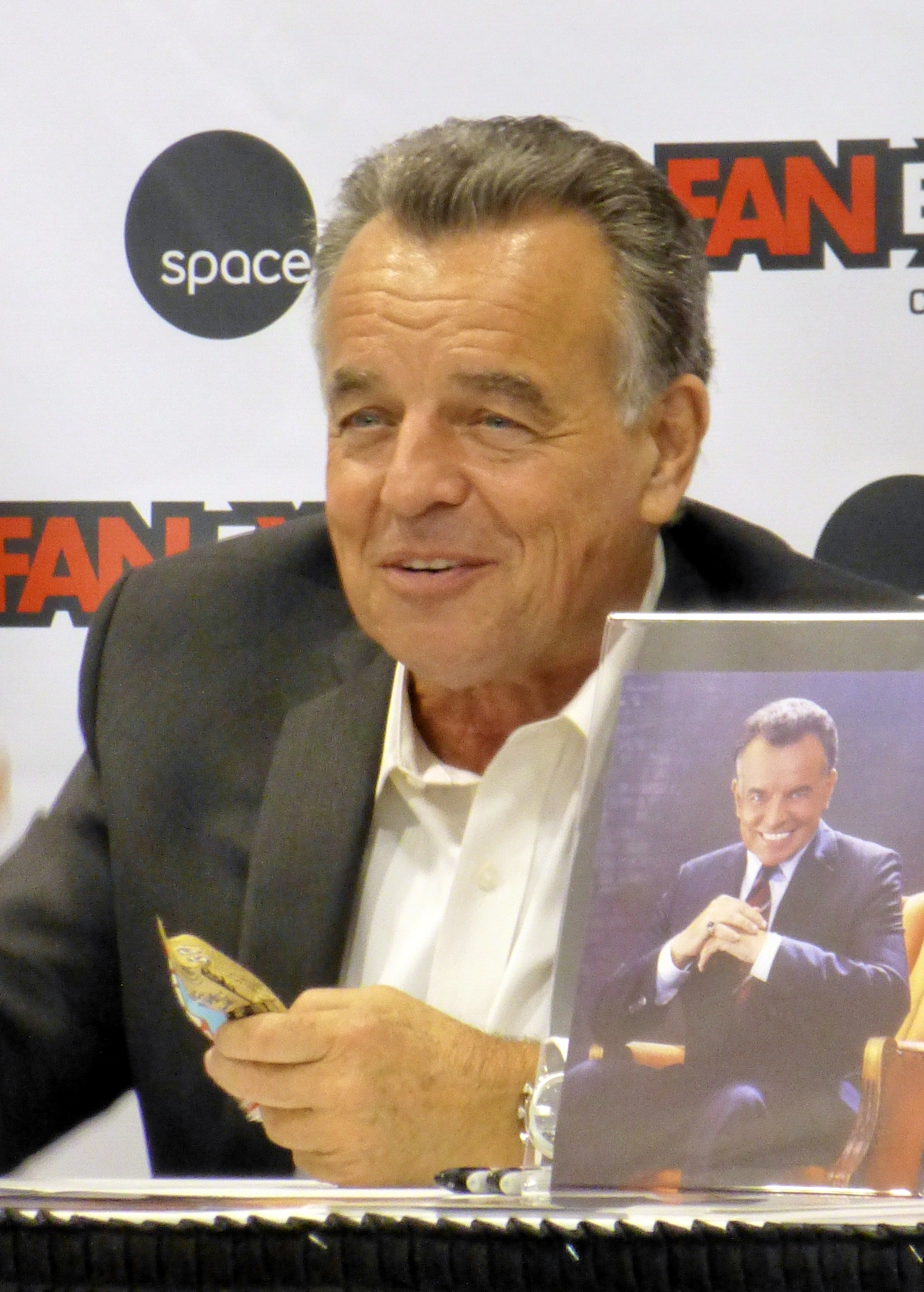
Ray Wise

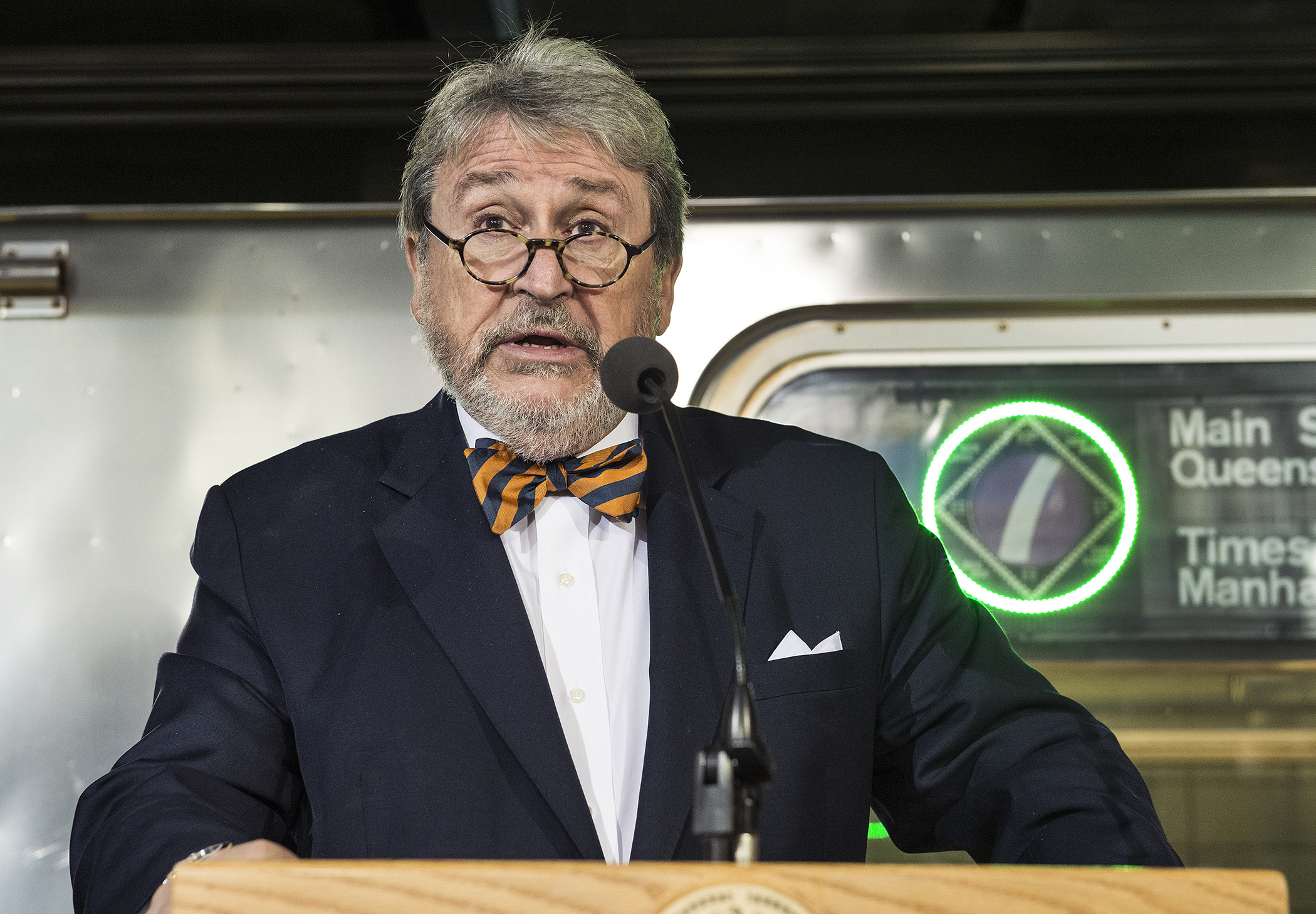
Michael Horodniceanu

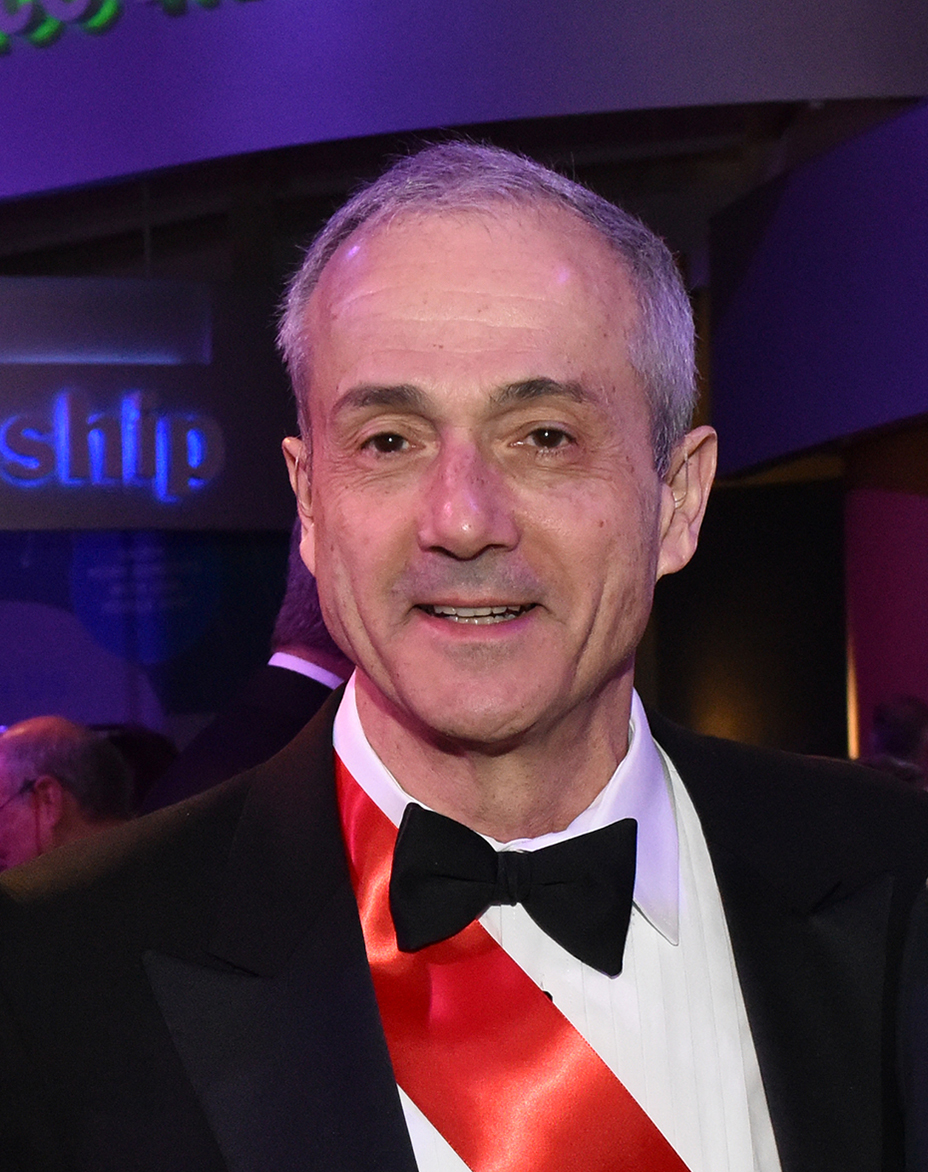
Adrian Bejan

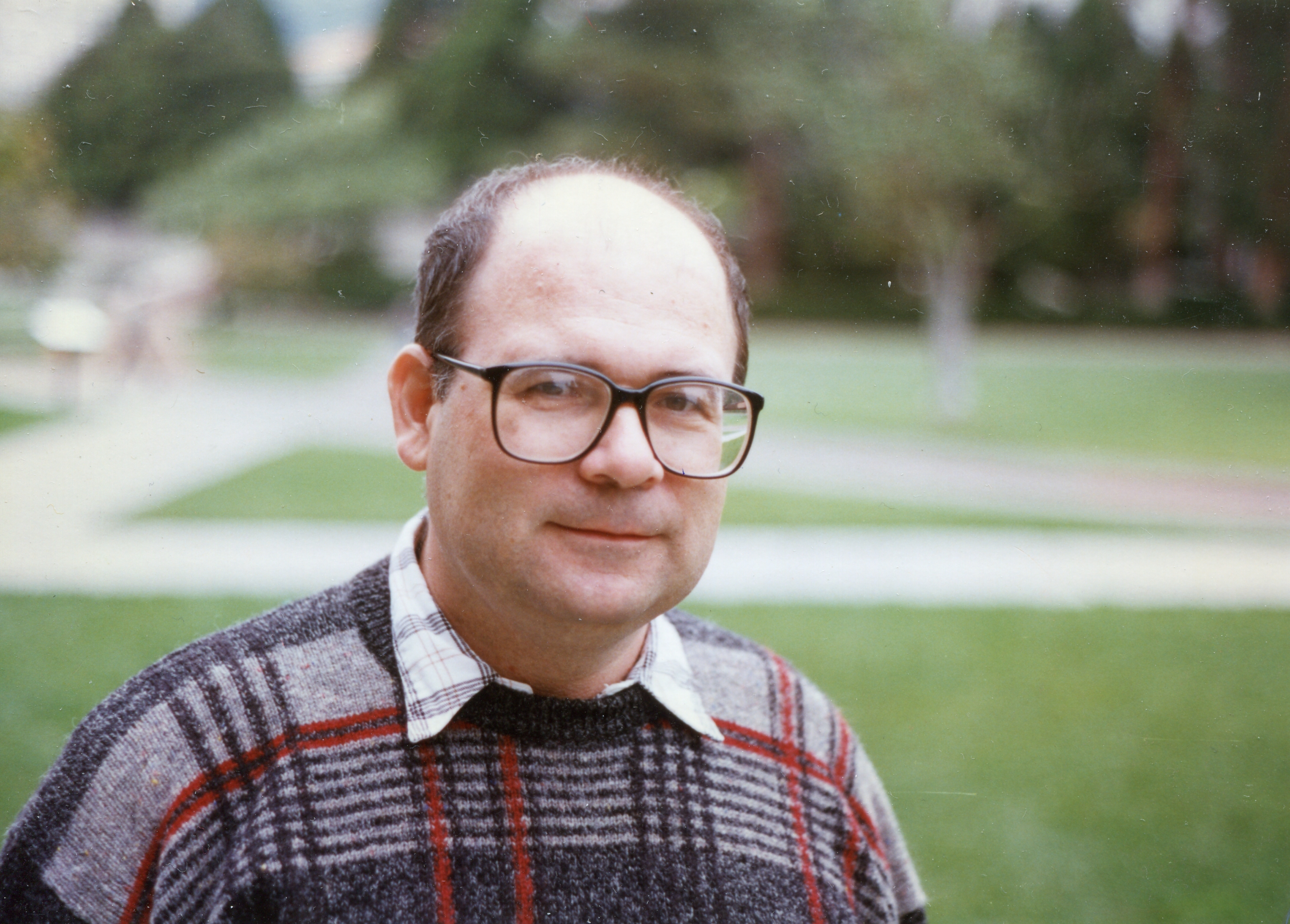
Dan-Virgil Voiculescu

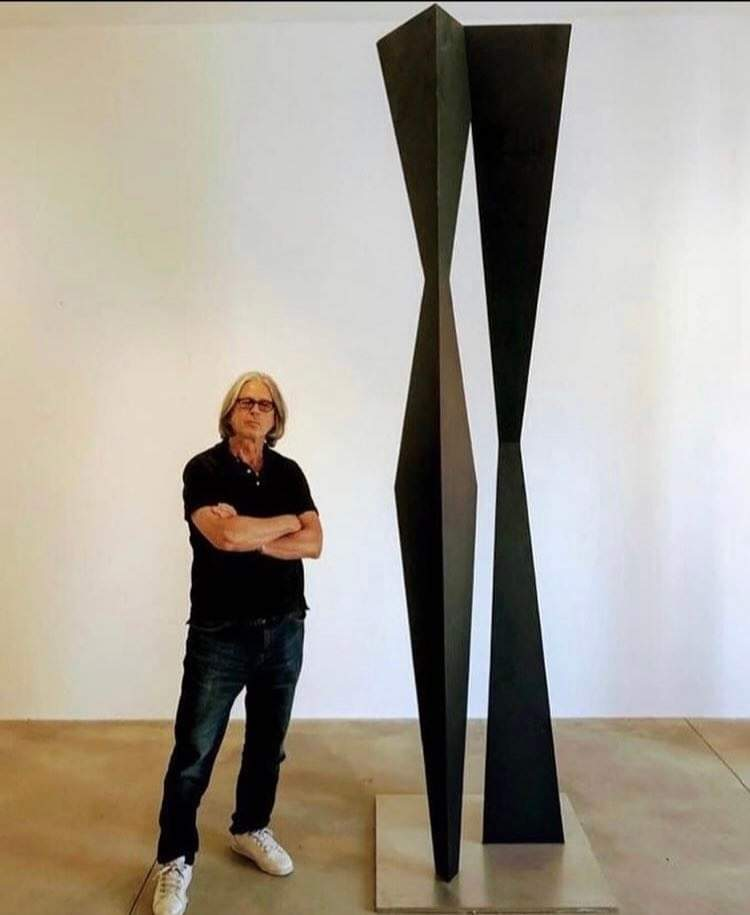
Christopher Georgesco

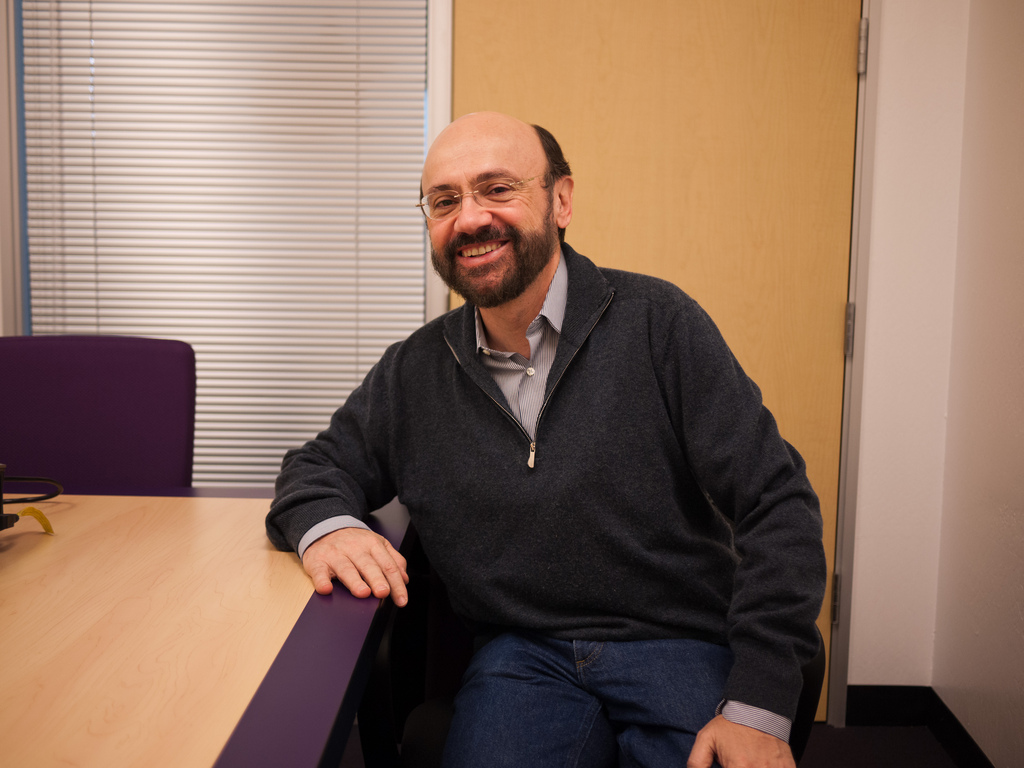
Andrei Broder

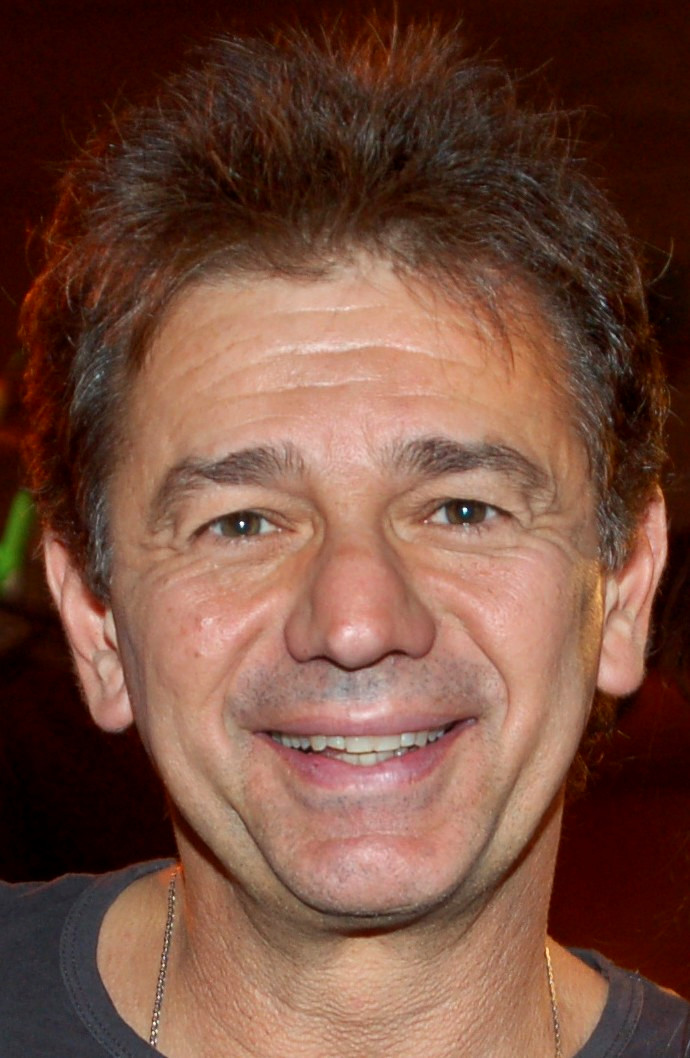
Adrian Zmed

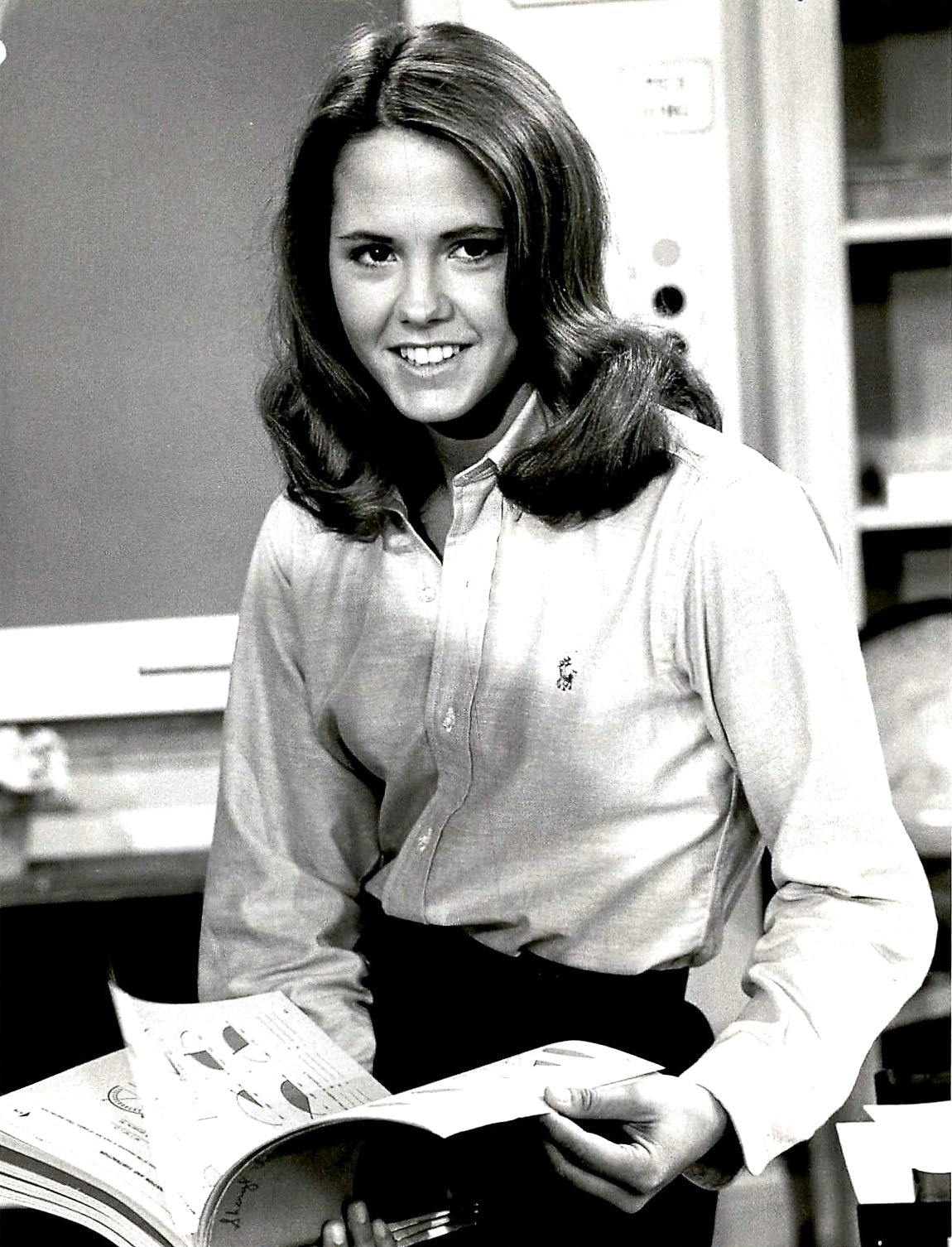
Melinda Culea

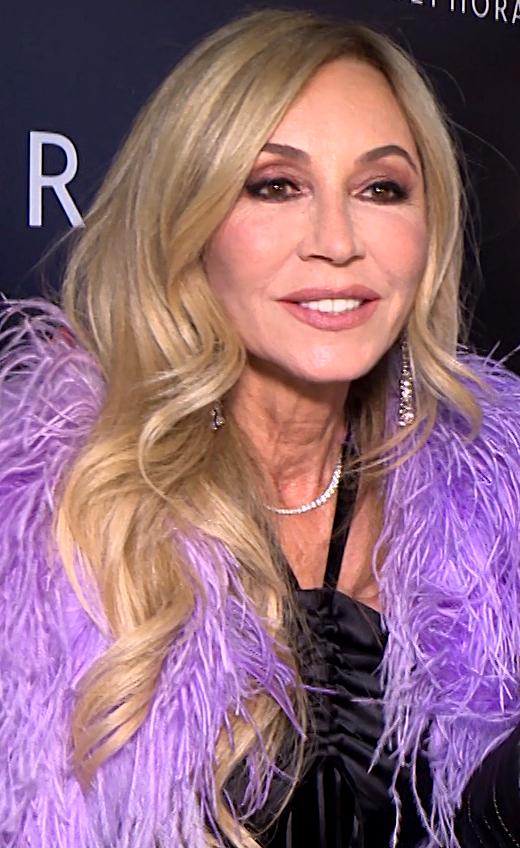
Anastasia Soare

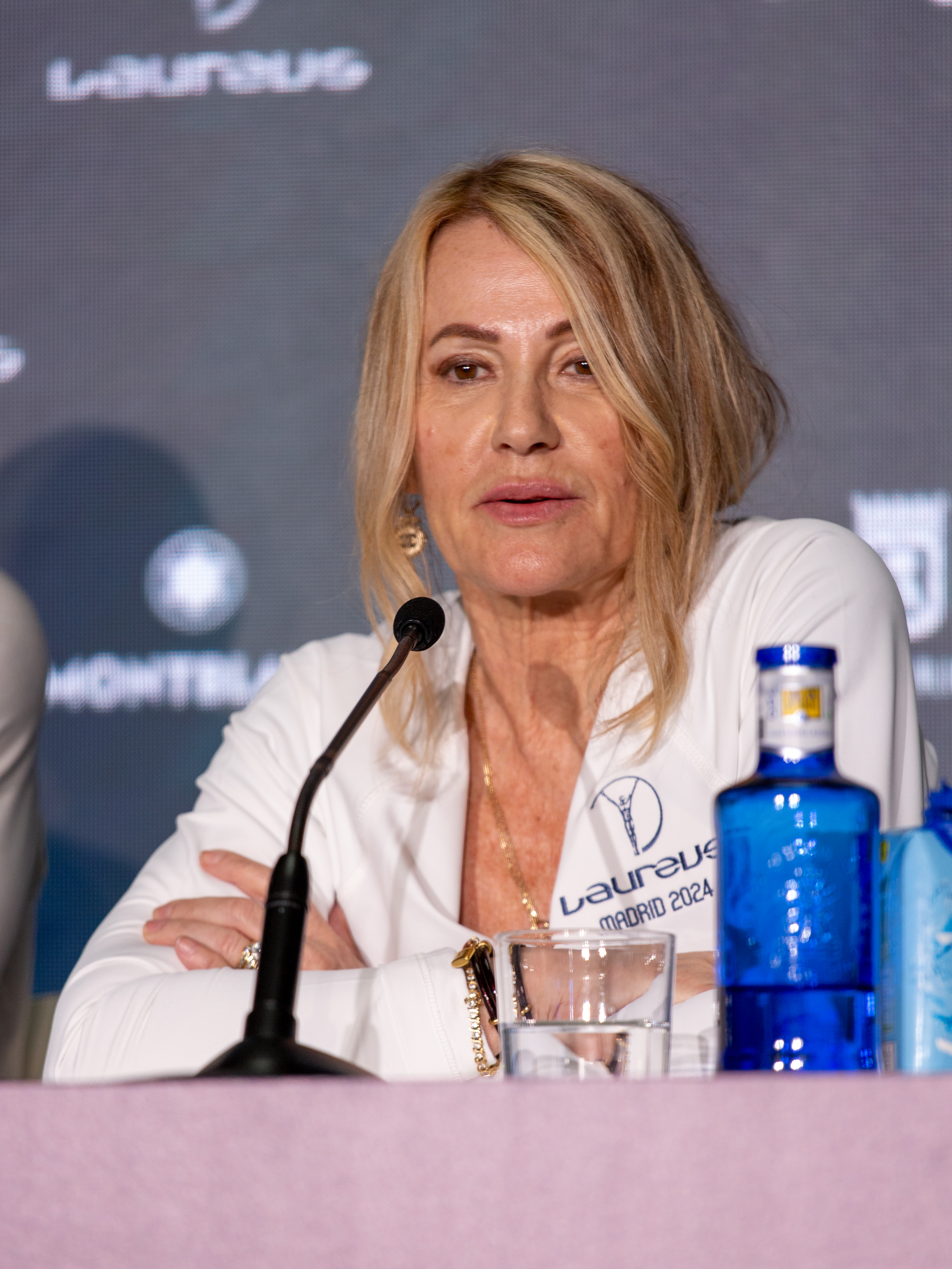
Nadia Comăneci

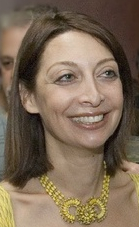
Illeana Douglas

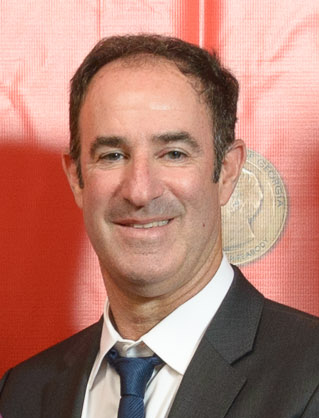
Steve Fainaru

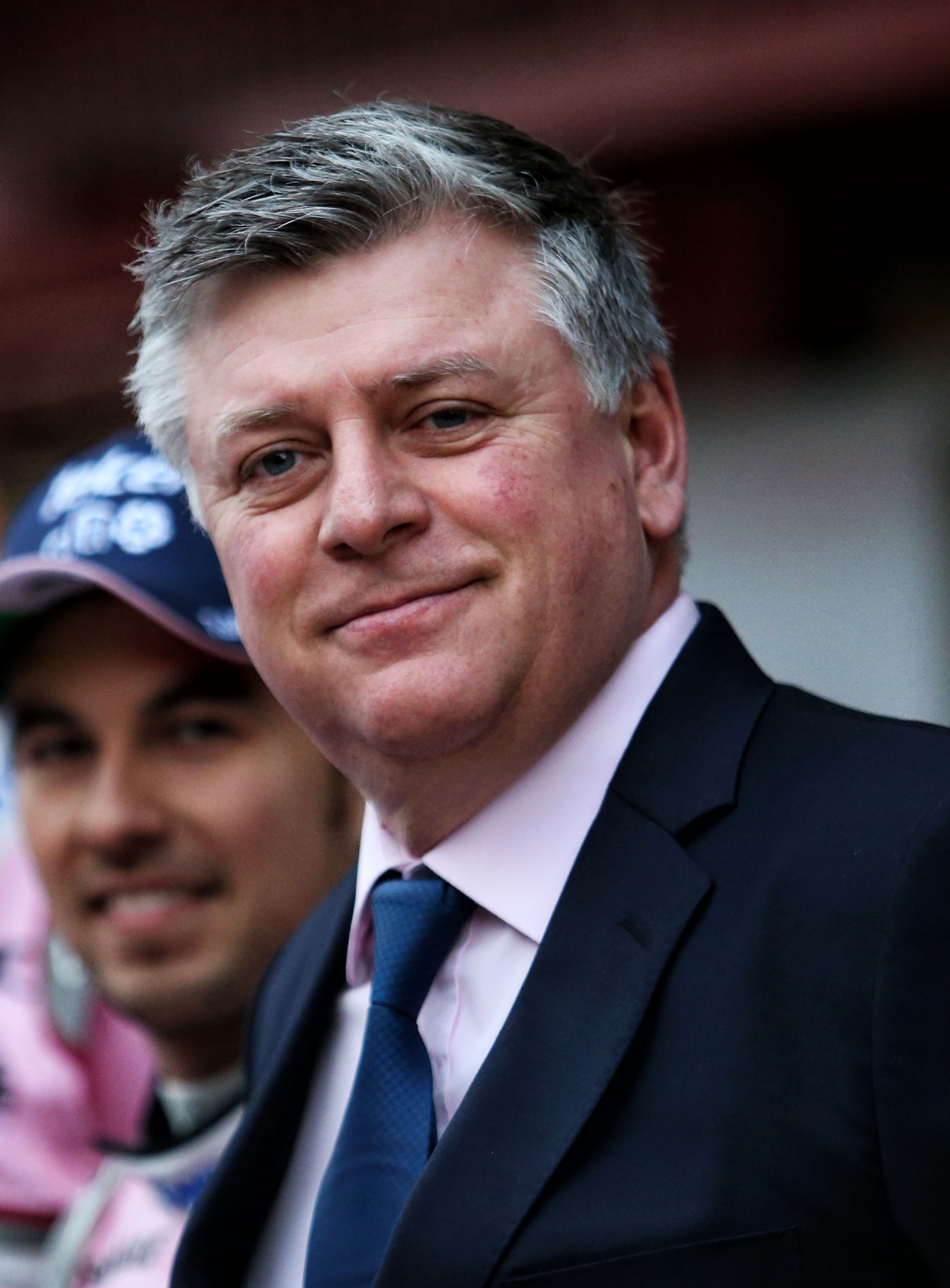
Otmar Szafnauer

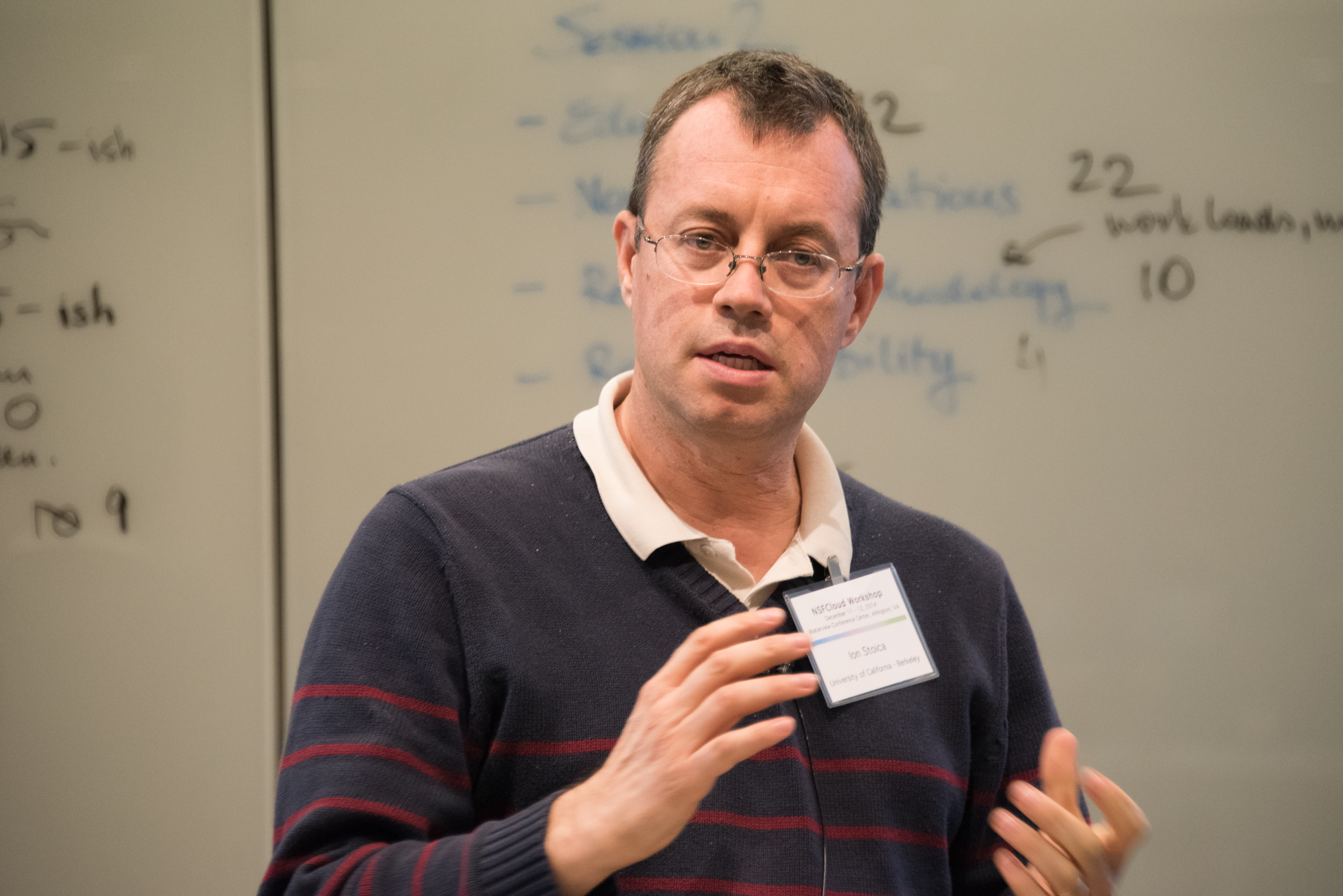
Ion Stoica

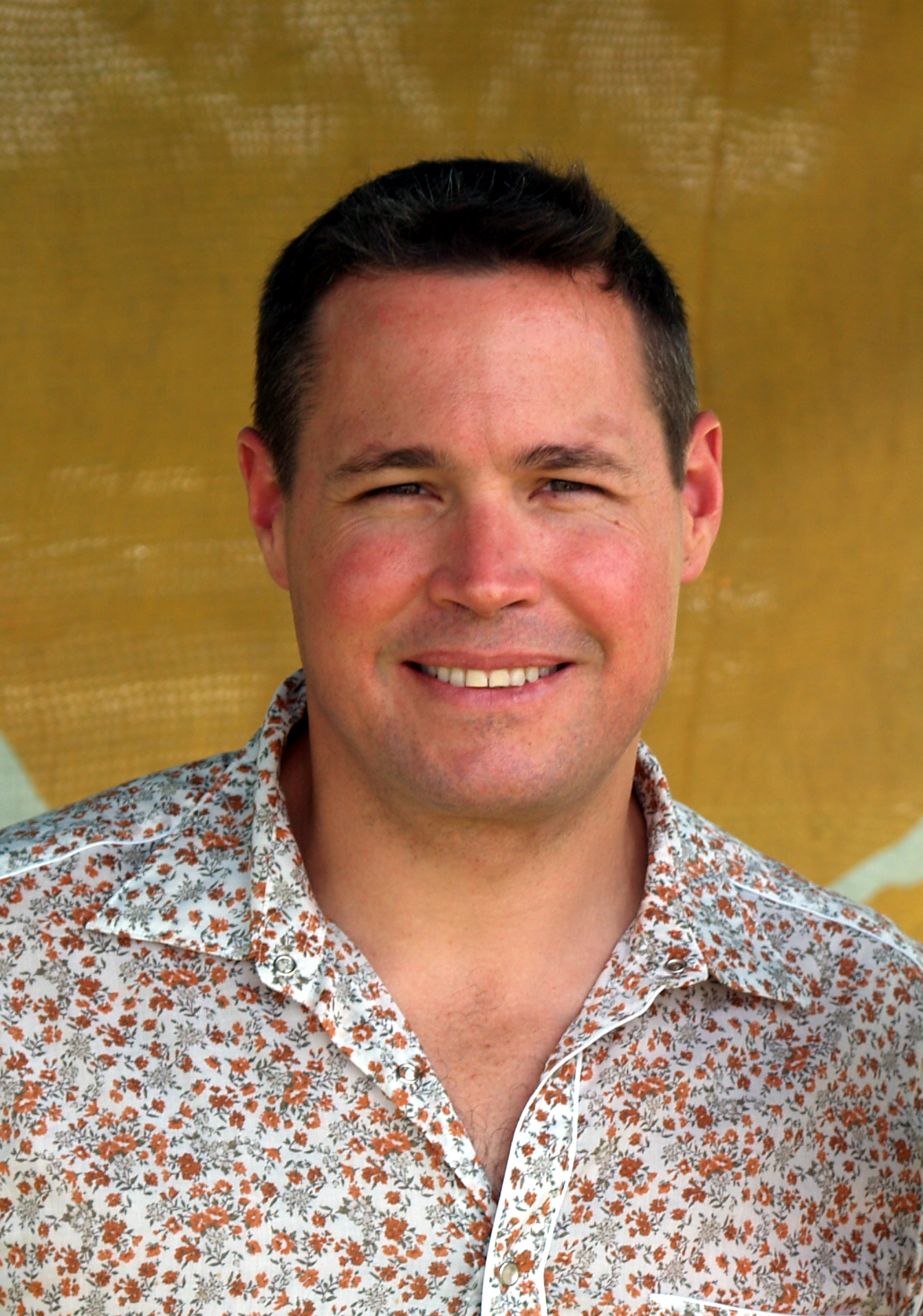
Jeff Corwin

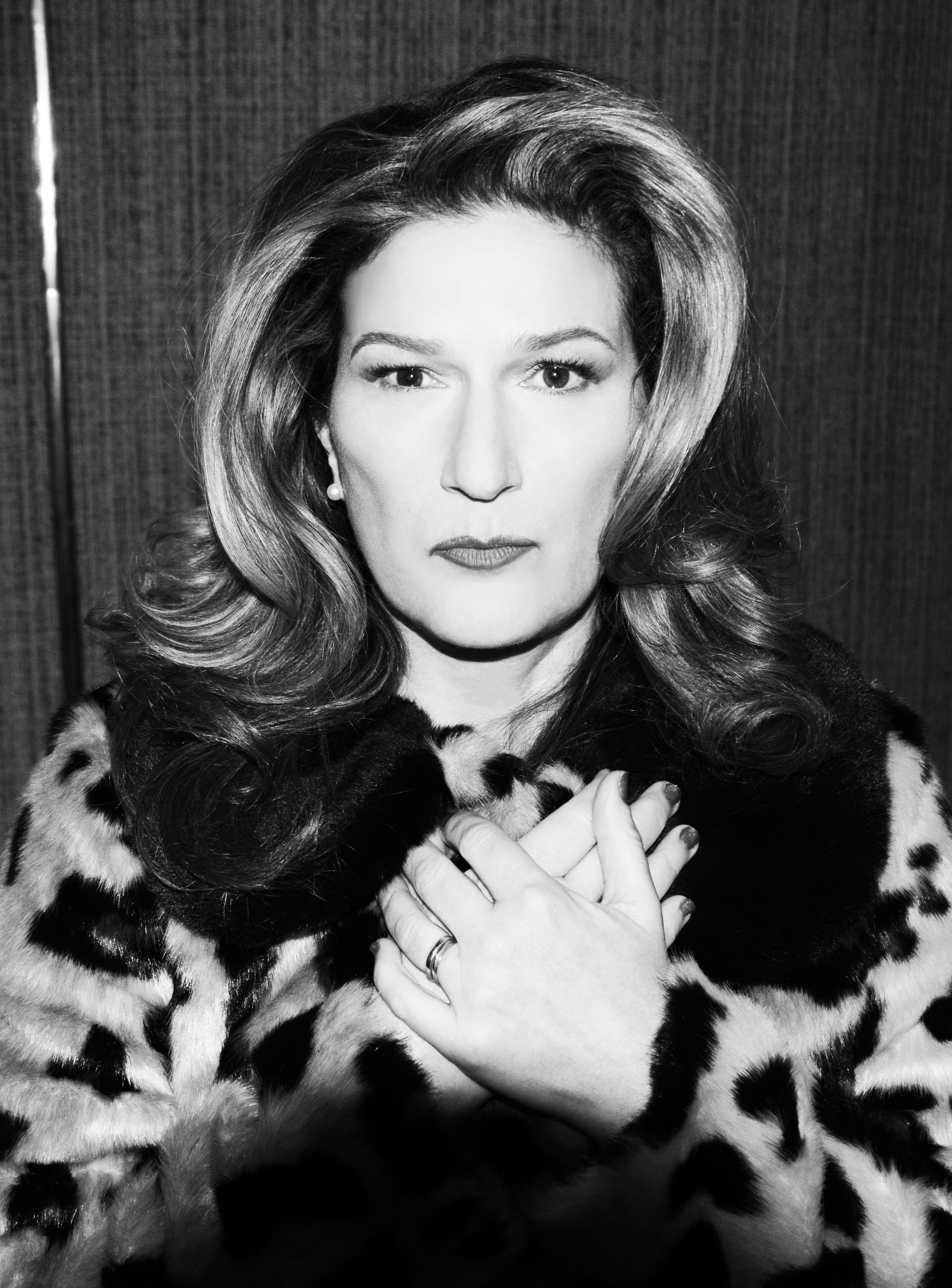
Ana Gasteyer

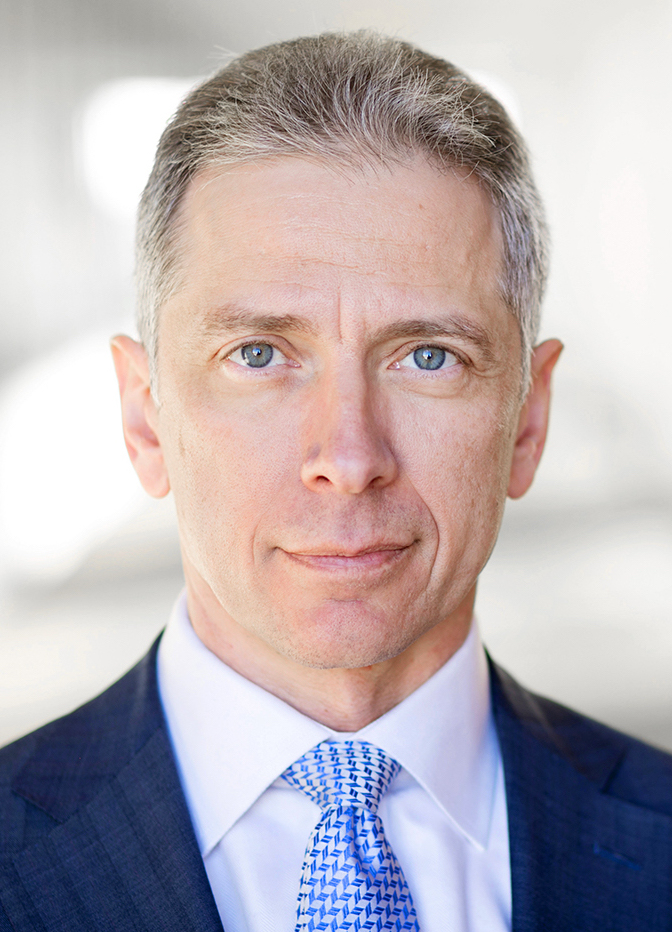
Andrei Iancu

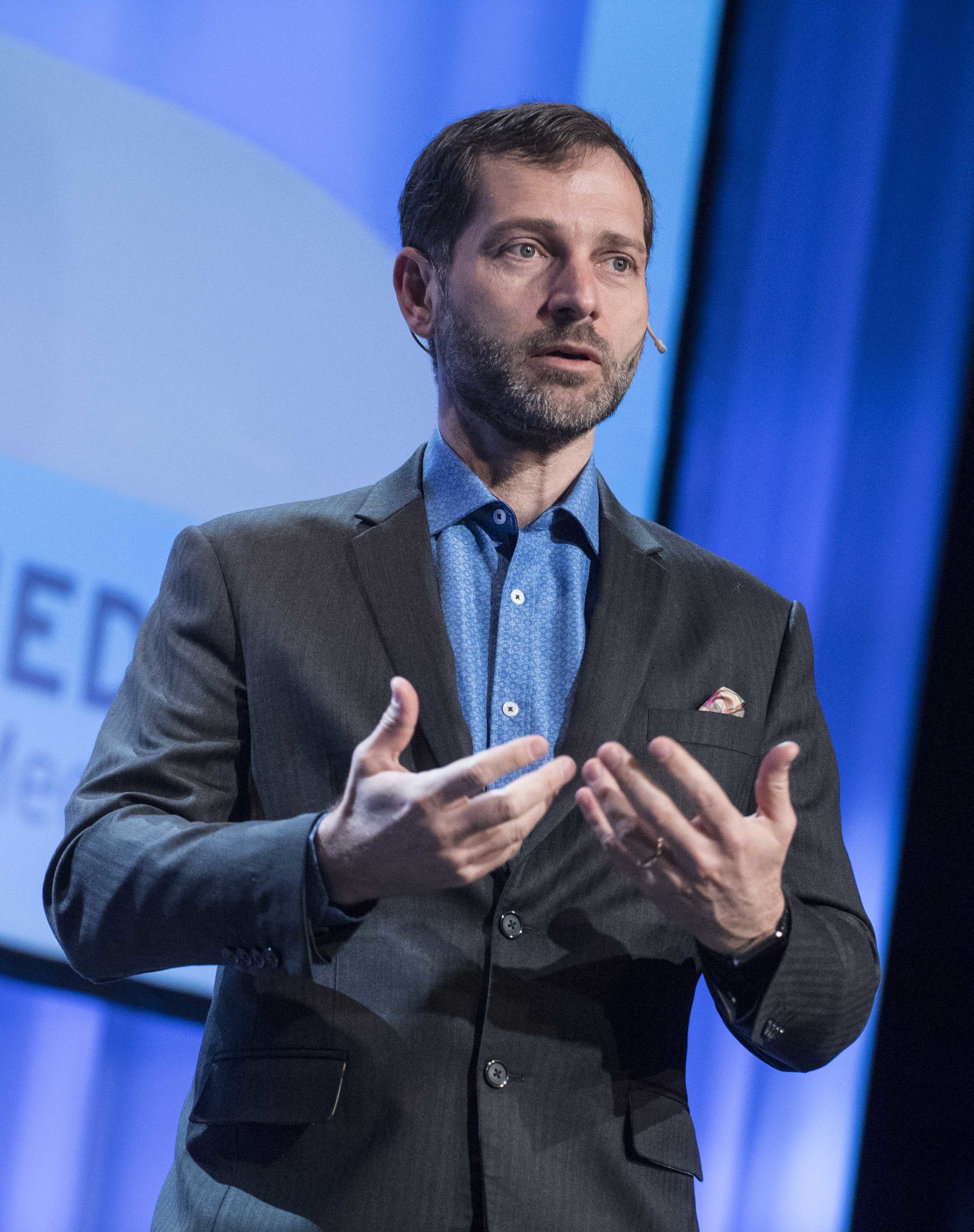
Horace Dediu

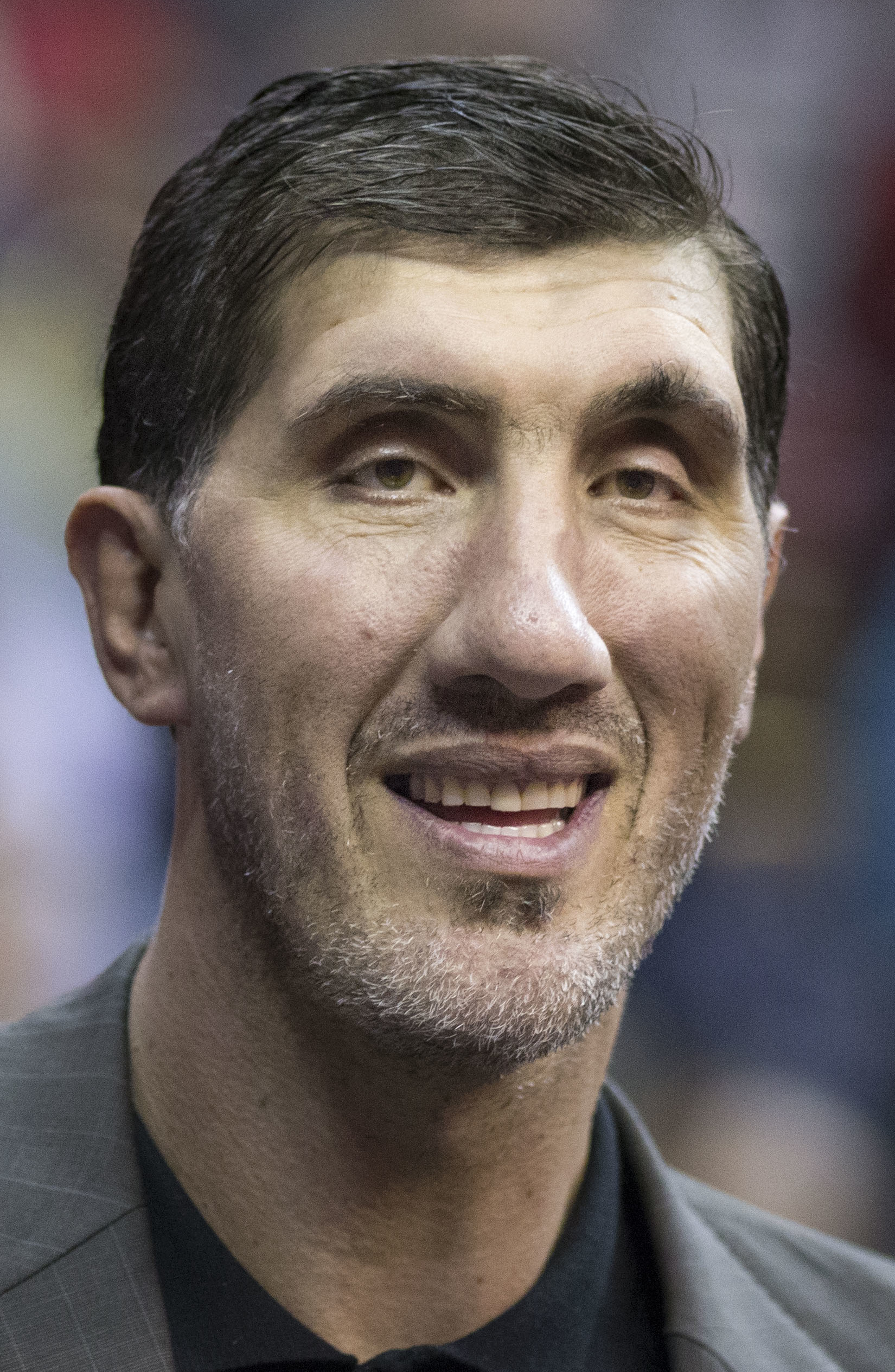
Gheorghe Mureșan

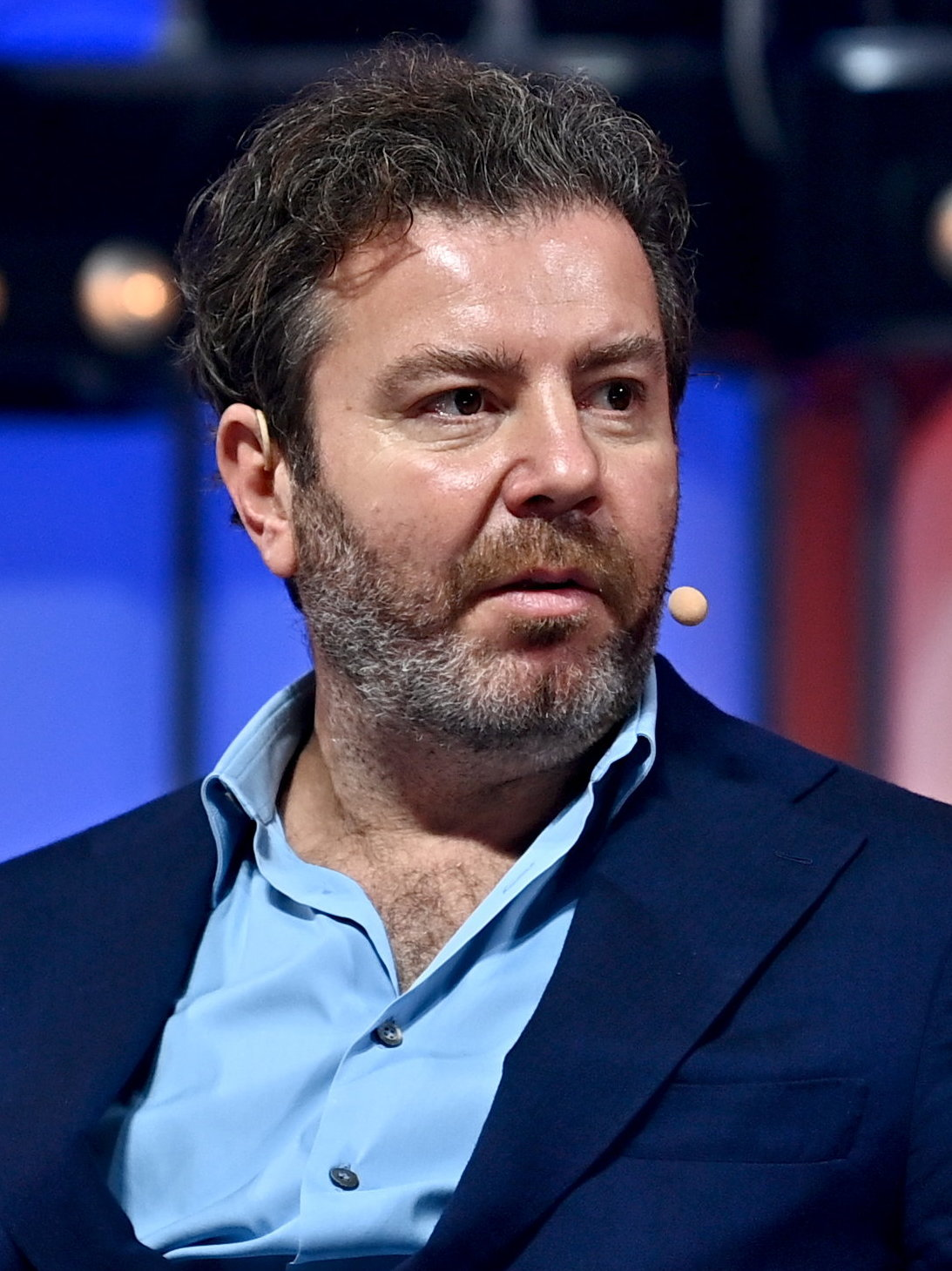
Daniel Dines

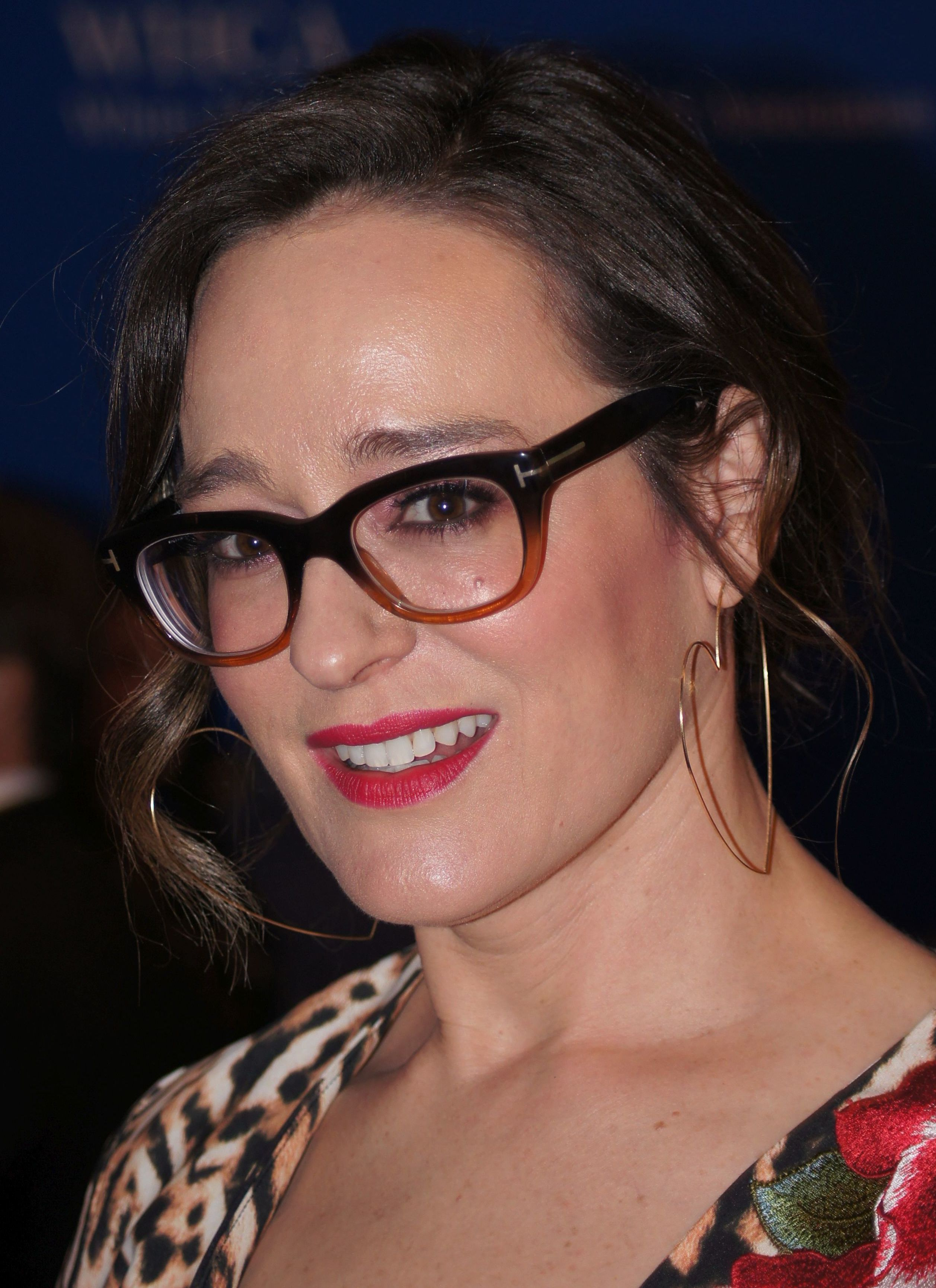
Lisa Kennedy

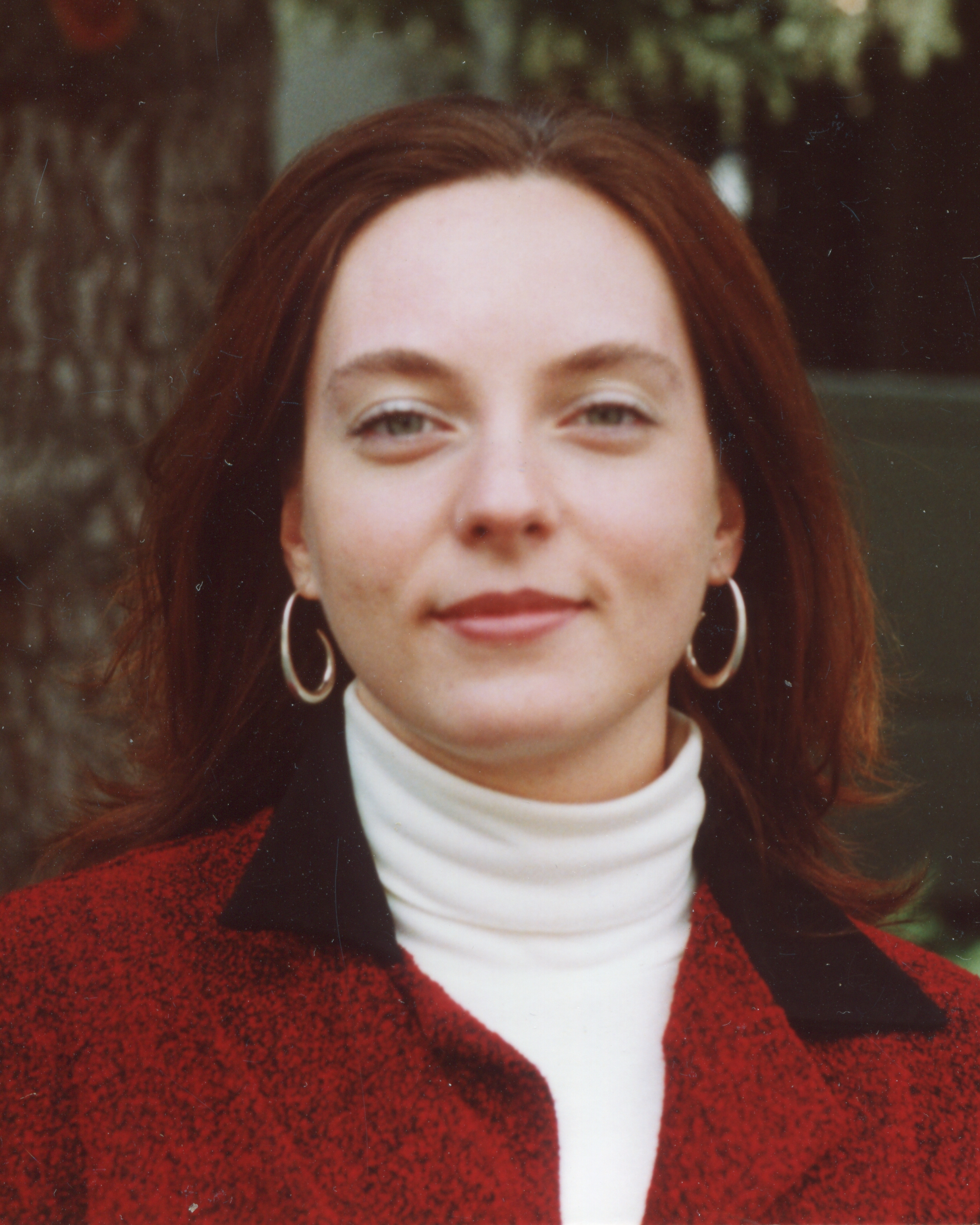
Ioana Dumitriu

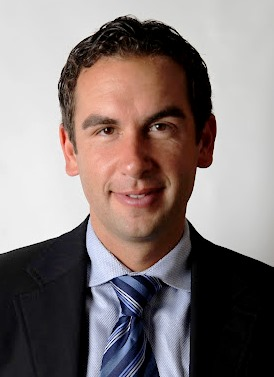
Steven Fulop

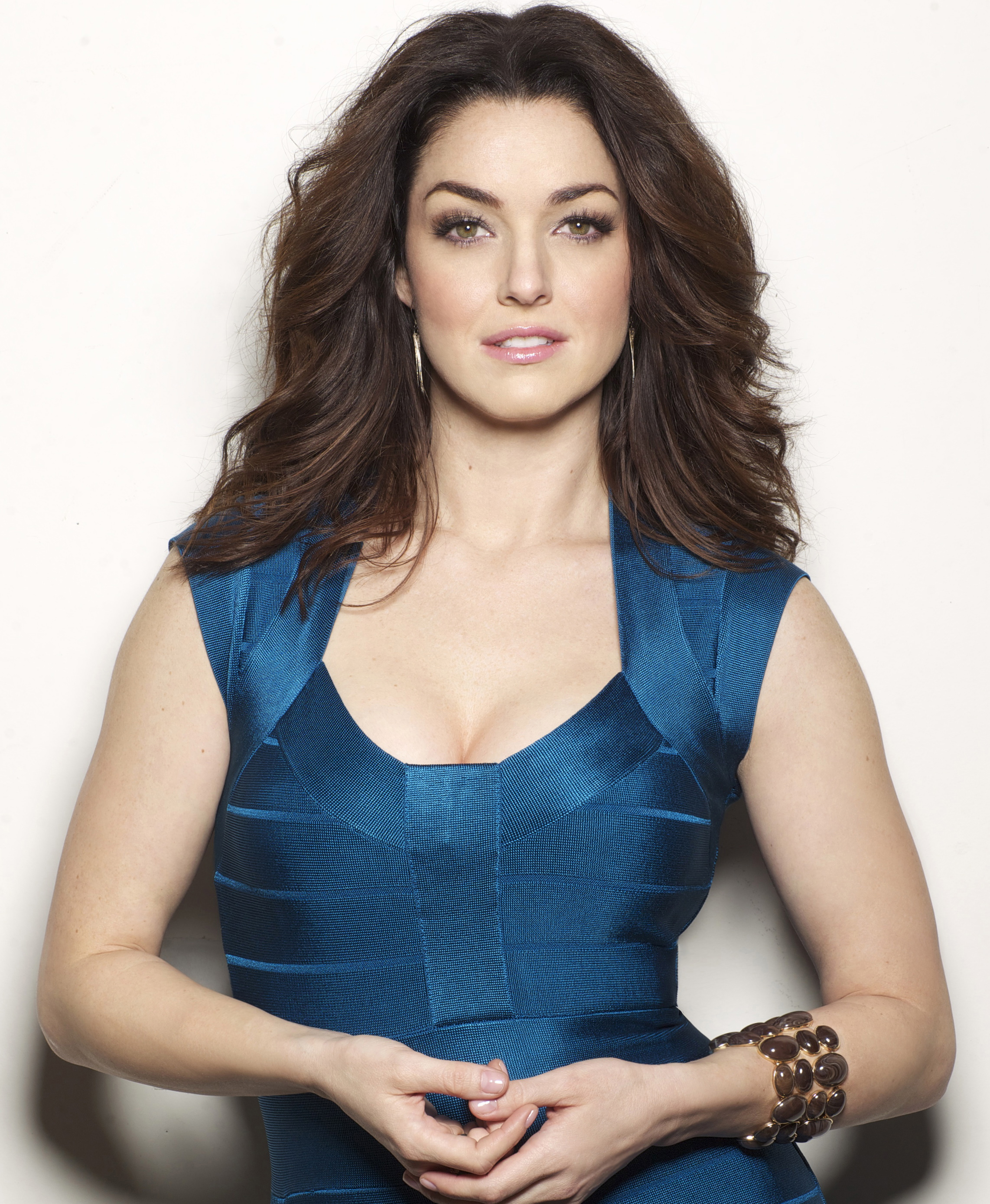
Sadie Alexandru

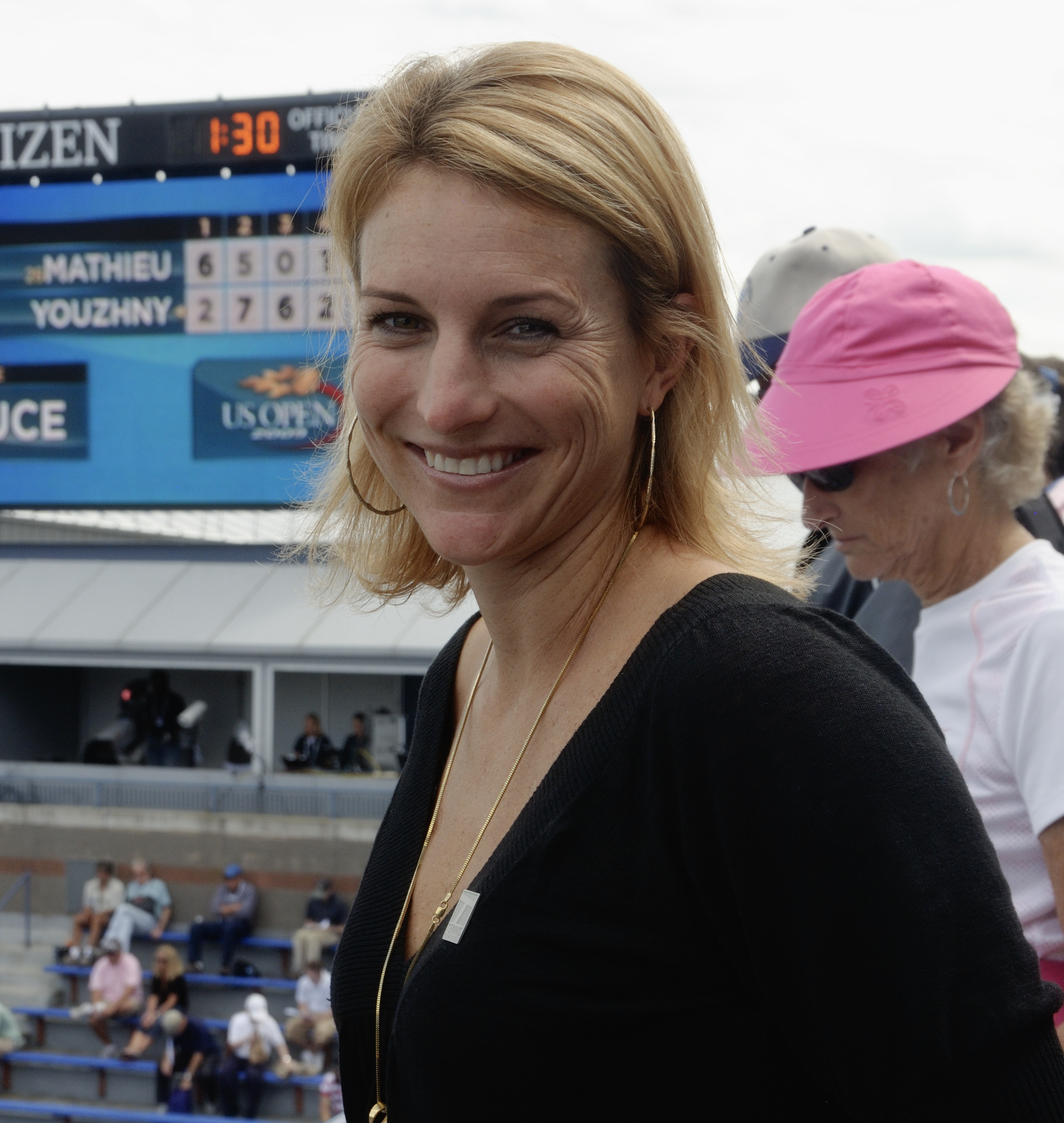
Corina Morariu

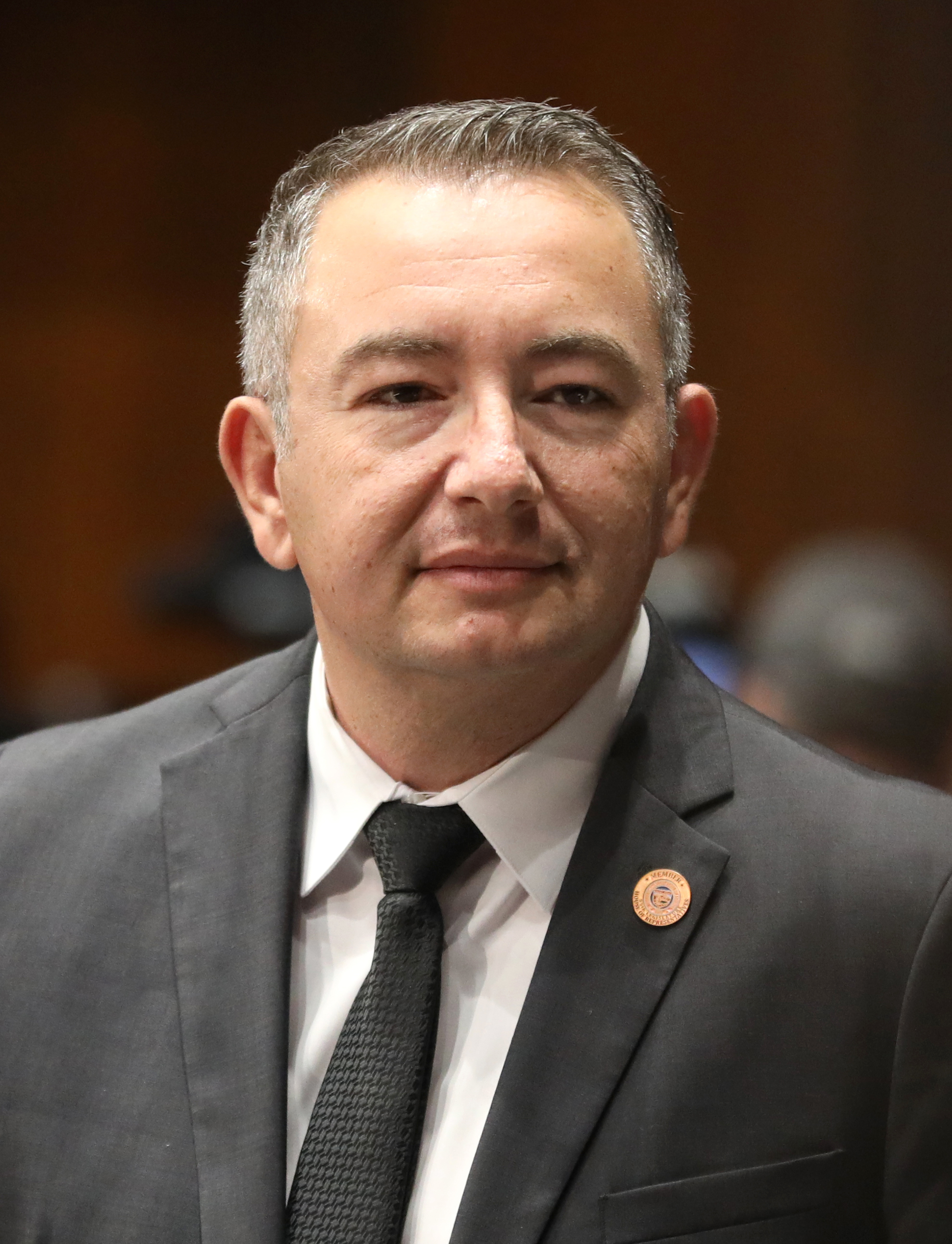
Ben Toma

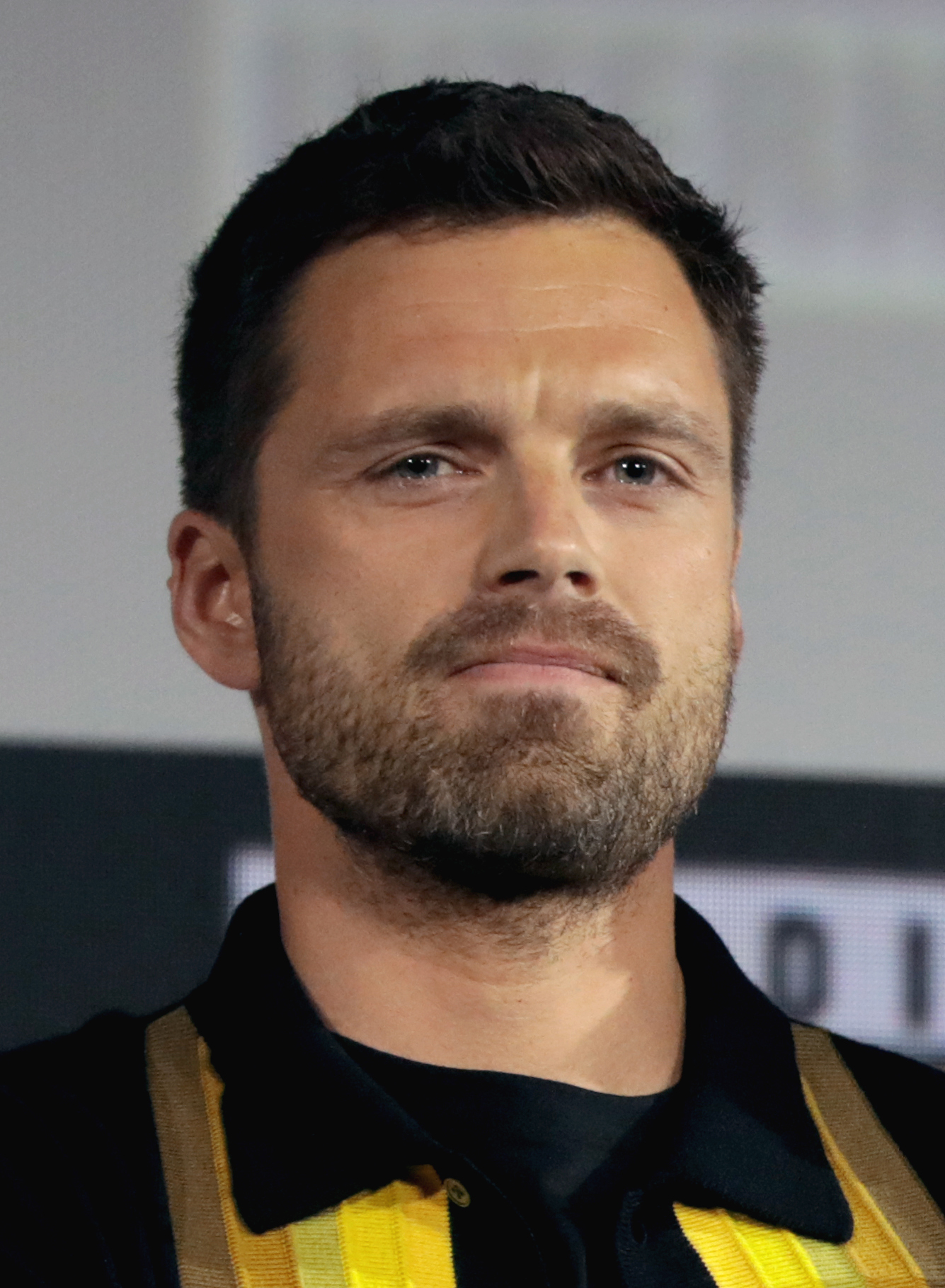
Sebastian Stan

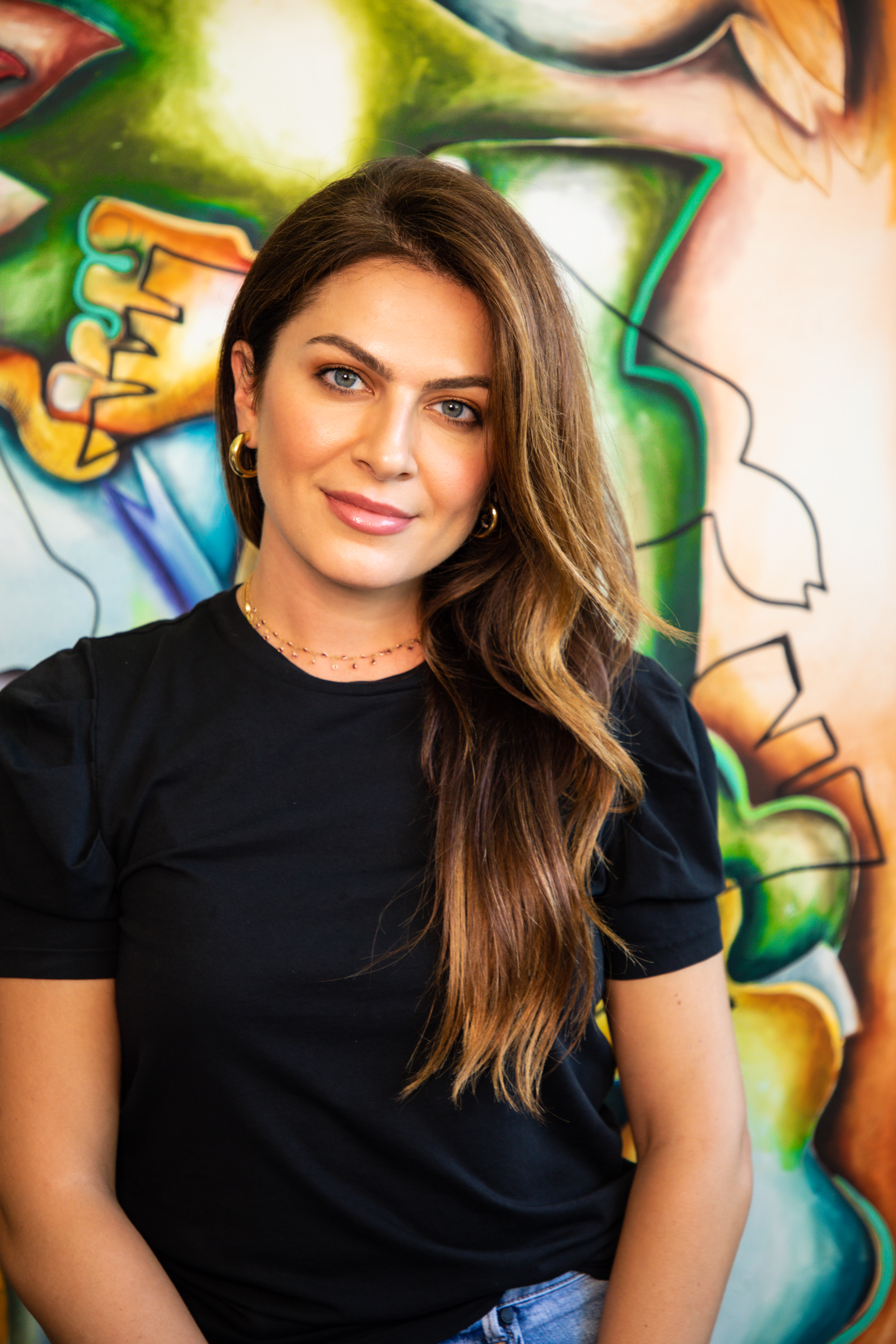
Alexandra Nechita

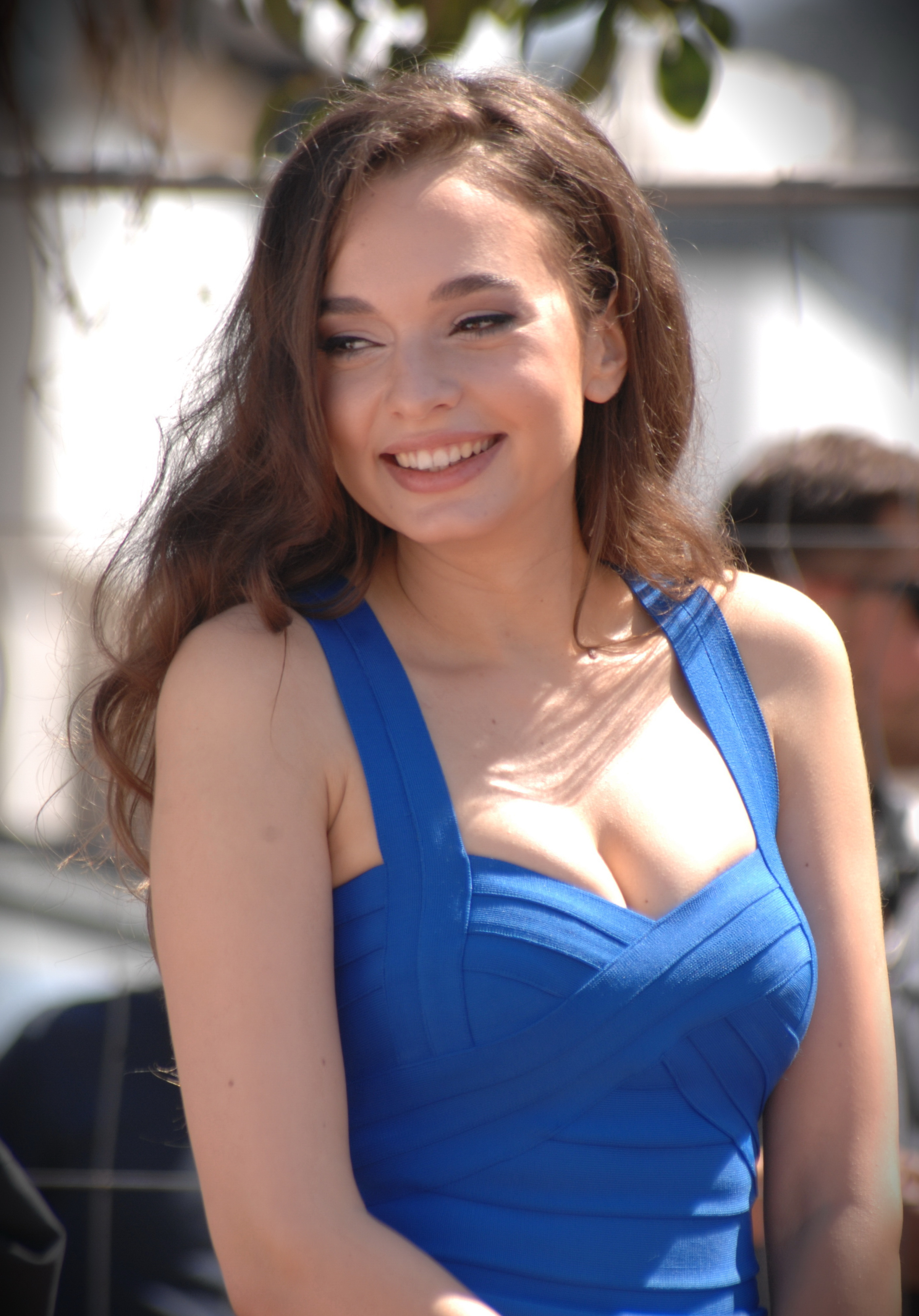
Ingrid Bisu

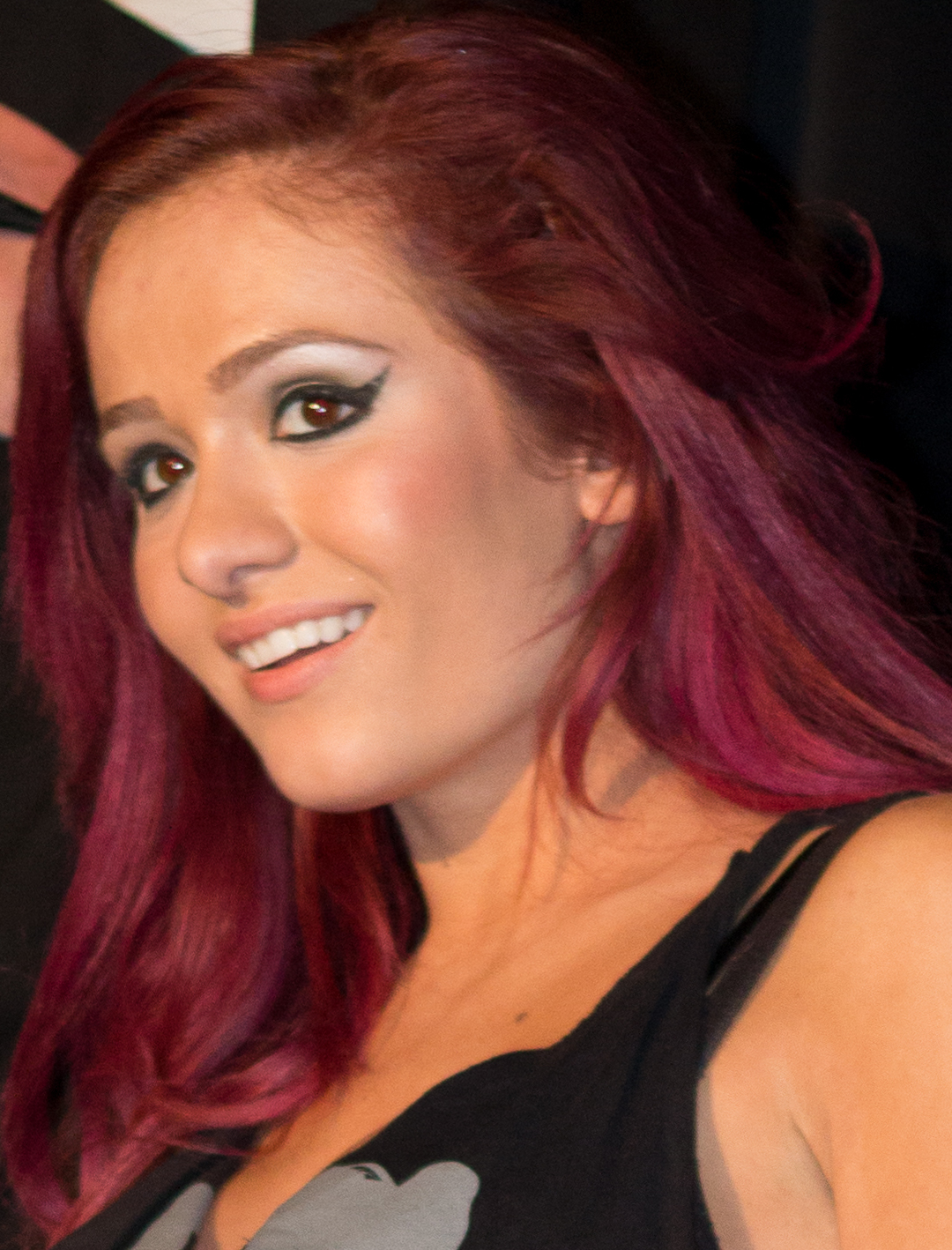
Scarlett Bordeaux

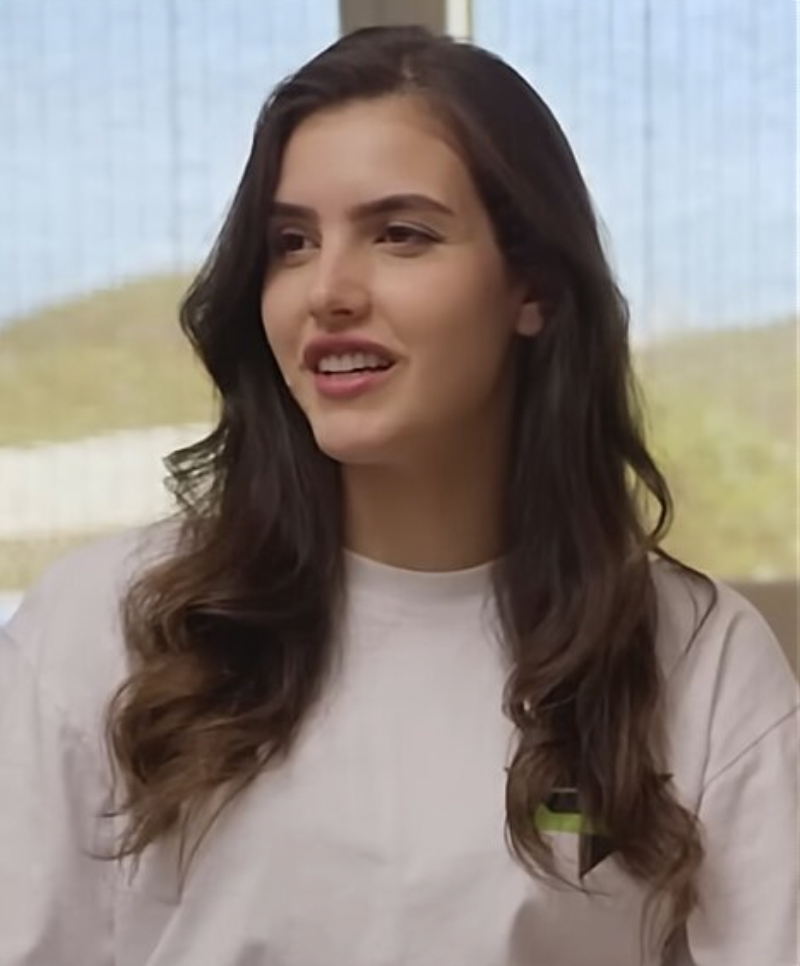
Alexandra Botez

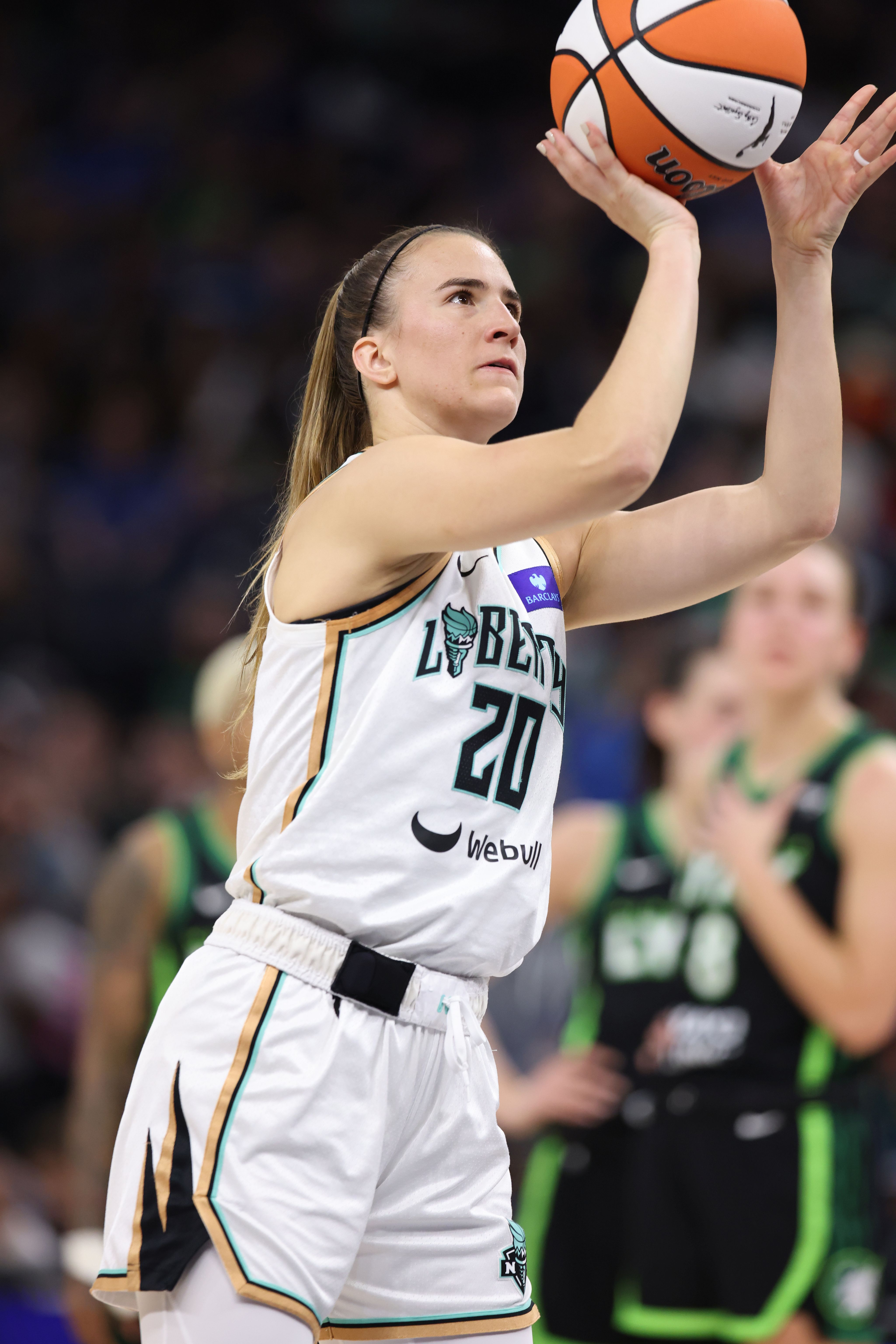
Sabrina Ionescu

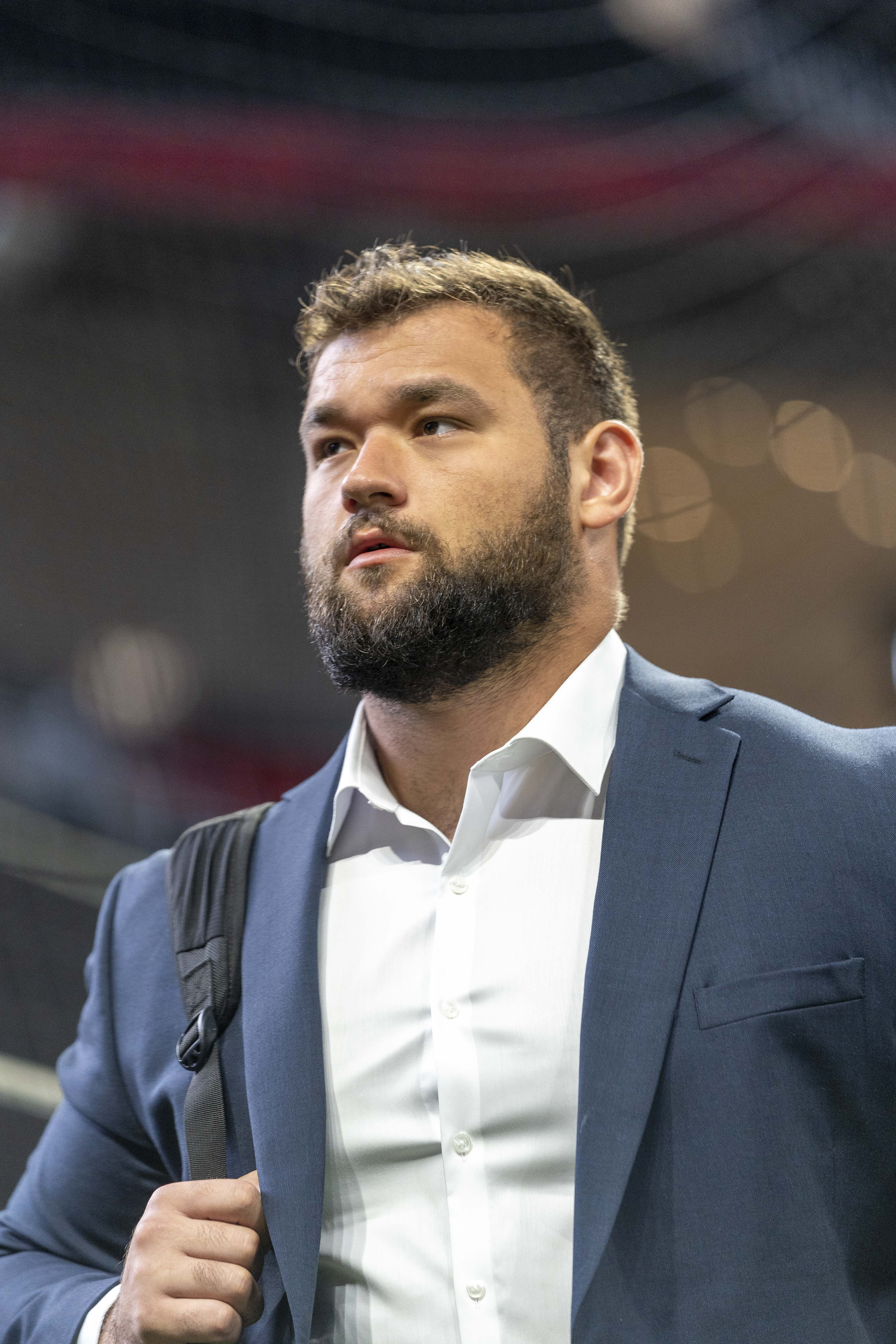
Sam Cosmi

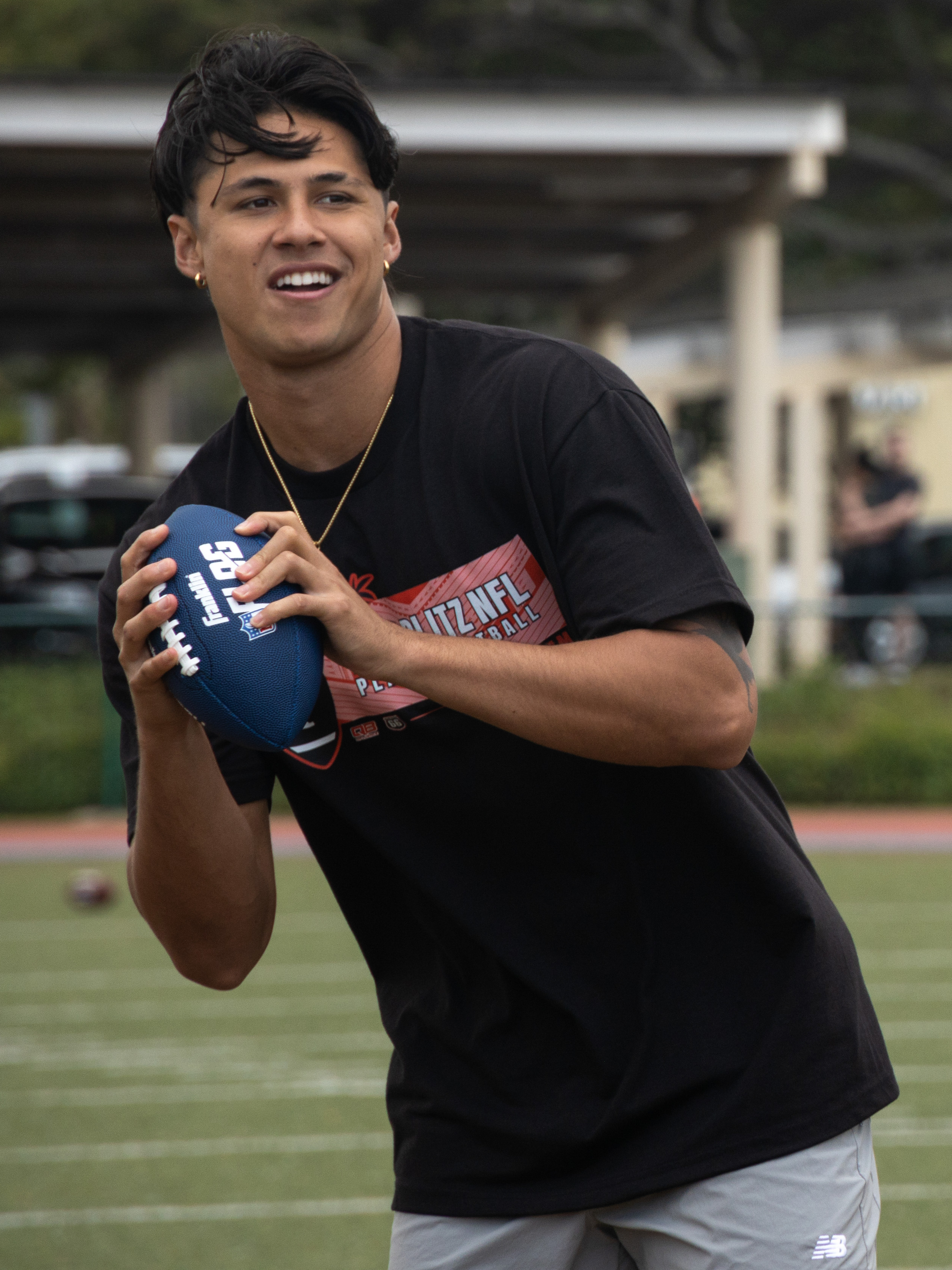
Andrei Iosivas

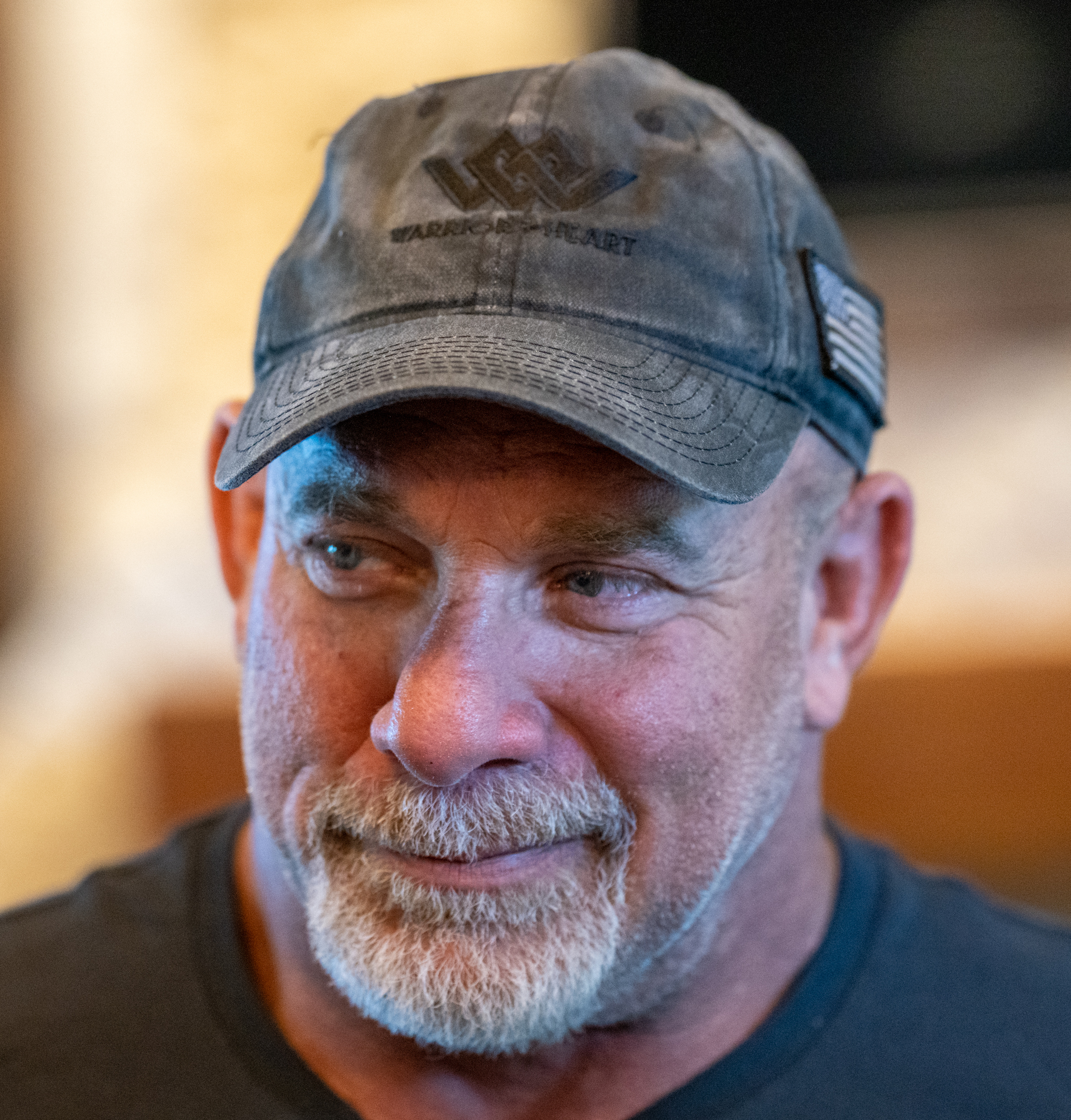
Bill Goldberg

== See also ==
- European Americans
- Romanian Canadians
- Romania–United States relations
- Romanian-American organizations
- Romanian-American Chamber of Commerce
- Romanian Orthodox Metropolis of the Americas
- The Romanian Orthodox Episcopate of America
- Moldovan Americans
