= List of Romanian Americans =

Americans of Romanian birth or descent

This is a list of notable Romanian-Americans, including both original immigrants from Romania who obtained American citizenship and their American descendants.

== Academics ==
=== Literary critics ===
- Matei Călinescu – professor at Indiana University Bloomington

=== Mathematicians ===
- Alexandra Bellow – mathematician, professor emeritus at Northwestern University
- Ana Caraiani – mathematician, member of the American Mathematical Society
- Ioana Dumitriu – mathematician, professor at the University of Washington
- Ciprian Foias – mathematician, distinguished professor at Texas A&M University
- Tudor Ganea – mathematician, known for his work in algebraic topology
- Nicholas Georgescu-Roegen – mathematician, statistician, and economist
- Matei Machedon – mathematician, professor at the University of Maryland
- Ciprian Manolescu – mathematician, professor at Stanford University
- Irina Mitrea – mathematician, professor at Temple University
- Mircea Mustață – mathematician, professor at the University of Michigan
- Florian Pop – mathematician, professor at the University of Pennsylvania
- Mihnea Popa – mathematician, professor at Northwestern University
- Sorin Popa – mathematician, professor at the University of California, Los Angeles
- Cristian Dumitru Popescu – mathematician, professor at the University of California, San Diego
- Ovidiu Savin – mathematician, professor at Columbia University
- Rodica Simion – mathematician, known for her work in combinatorics
- Ileana Streinu – mathematician, professor at Smith College
- Bogdan Suceavă – mathematician, professor at California State University Fullerton
- Dan-Virgil Voiculescu – mathematician, professor at the University of California, Berkeley
- Alexandru Zaharescu – mathematician, professor at the University of Illinois at Urbana–Champaign

=== Historians, sociologists and philosophers ===
- Eugene Borza – professor of history at Pennsylvania State University
- Ioan Petru Culianu – historian of religion
- Mircea Eliade – philosopher, writer, historian of religions
- Radu Florescu – emeritus professor of history at Boston College

== Art ==
- Eugen Ciucă – sculptor
- Noche Crist – painter
- Christopher Georgesco – sculptor
- Cristian Gheorghiu – contemporary artist
- Ami James – tattoo artist
- De Hirsh Margules – painter (Romanian-Jewish descent)
- Alexandra Nechita – cubist painter

== Architects ==
- Max Abramovitz – architect of Avery Fisher Hall, of Romanian-Jewish descent
- Haralamb H. Georgescu – architect

== Business ==
- Micky Arison – chairman of Carnival Corporation and owner of NBA's Miami Heat
- Jeffrey Brotman – co-founder of Costco Wholesale Corporation (Romanian-Jewish descent)
- Safra Catz – CEO of Oracle Corporation
- Dan Dascalescu – entrepreneur, co-founder of Blueseed
- John DeLorean – engineer, founder of the DeLorean Motor Company
- Peter Georgescu – chairman emeritus of Young & Rubicam
- Michael Horodniceanu – engineer and businessman, former president of MTA Capital Construction
- Stephanie Korey – co-founder and executive chairman of Away
- David Marcus – former president of PayPal, and current vice president of Messaging Products at Facebook
- Martin Bud Seretean – founder, and former CEO of Coronet Industries
- Anastasia Soare – CEO and founder of Anastasia Beverly Hills
- Christine Valmy – founded the first esthetician school in the United States

== Entertainment ==
=== Actors ===
- Sadie Alexandru – actress
- Lauren Bacall – actress (Romanian Jewish mother)
- Bob Balaban – actor (part Romanian-Jewish descent)
- Jillian Bell – actress and screenwriter
- Tim Conway – actor and comedian (Romanian mother)
- Melinda Culea – actress
- Illeana Douglas – actress
- Fran Drescher – actress and comedian (part Romanian-Jewish descent)
- Tim Dunigan – actor
- Jennifer Ehle – actress
- Lisa Ferraday – actress
- Ana Gasteyer – actress and comedian
- Joseph Gordon-Levitt – actor (part Romanian-Jewish descent)
- Oana Gregory – actress
- Dustin Hoffman – actor and filmmaker (part Romanian-Jewish descent)
- Harvey Keitel – actor and producer (Romanian Jewish mother)
- Tristan Leabu – actor
- Andrea Marcovicci – actress and singer
- Johnny Pacar – actor and singer
- David Pittu – actor
- Natalie Portman – Academy Award-winning actress (part Romanian-Jewish descent)
- Carl Reiner – comedian and actor (Romanian Jewish mother)
- Edward G. Robinson – actor (Romanian-Jewish descent)
- Sebastian Stan – actor
- Johnny Weissmuller – Olympic swimmer, water polo player and actor
- Ray Wise – actor (Romanian mother)
- Adrian Zmed – actor best known from the T.J. Hooker television series

=== Screenwriter, directors and producer of films and theatre ===
- Frieda Fishbein – literary and theatrical agent
- Stanley Kubrick – film director, screenwriter, producer and photographer; his father's parents and paternal grandparents were of Romanian Jewish descent
- Jean Negulesco – film director and screenwriter
- Petru Popescu – screenwriter from Hollywood and best-selling author
- Steve Sabol – film producer and one of the founders of NFL Films
- Andrei Șerban – director of theater and opera
- Erwin Stoff – film producer and founder of 3 Arts Entertainment

=== Singers and musicians ===
- Herb Alpert – lead singer, and horn player with Tijuana Brass (Romanian-Jewish descent)
- Lucian Ban – jazz piano player, composer
- Shelby Cinca – punk rock guitarist
- Sergiu Comissiona – conductor and musician
- Valery Gaina – guitarist, songwriter, composer
- Art Garfunkel – singer, poet, and actor (Romanian-Jewish descent)
- Angela Gheorghiu – soprano
- Alma Gluck – soprano
- Christina Grimmie – singer
- Harloe – singer
- Șerban Lupu – violinist
- Yolanda Marculescu – soprano
- Necro – rapper
- Margareta Paslaru – singer
- Irma Wolpe Rademacher – pianist
- Beverly Sills – soprano
- Yeat – rapper, singer, audio engineer (Romanian mother)
- Virginia Zeani – opera singer

== Sports ==
- Fred Arbanas (1939–2021) – American football player
- Danny Barbir (born 1998) – soccer player
- Nadia Comăneci (born 1961) – Olympic gold medalist in gymnastics (defected to the US in 1989)
- Sam Cosmi (born 1999) – American football player
- Nick Denes (1906–1975) – American football and basketball coach
- Annaliese Dragan (born 2005) – rhythmic gymnast
- Eric Ghiaciuc (born 1981) – American football player
- John Ghindia (1925–2012) – American football player and coach
- Bill Goldberg (born 1966) – American football player and undefeated wrestler (Romanian-Jewish descent)
- Hroniss Grasu (born 1991) – American football player
- Hank Greenberg (1911–1986) – Baseball Hall of Famer (Romanian-Jewish descent)
- Lou Groza (1924–2000) – Pro Football Hall of Famer
- Ernie Grunfeld (born 1955) – basketball player and former general manager of the Washington Wizards
- Red Holzman (1920–1998) – NBA Hall of Fame coach and former player (Romanian Jewish mother)
- Sabrina Ionescu (born 1997) – basketball player for the New York Liberty; college honors at the University of Oregon include multiple national player of the year awards in 2019 and 2020
- Andrei Iosivas (born 1999) – wide receiver for the Cincinnati Bengals of the National Football League (NFL)
- Fred Lebow (1932–1994) – founder of the New York City Marathon
- Dominique Moceanu (born 1981) – US Olympic gymnast
- Corina Morariu (born 1978) – former professional tennis player, reached the world No. 1 ranking in doubles in 2000
- Gheorghe Mureșan (born 1971) – former NBA player; lives in USA
- Stephen Negoesco (1925–2019) – soccer coach
- Betty Okino (born 1975) – US Olympic gymnast
- Sam Paulescu (born 1984) – American football player
- Nick Roman (1947–2003) – American football player
- Dolph Schayes (1928–2015) – NBA Hall of Famer player and coach
- Bud Selig (born 1934) – commissioner of Major League Baseball
- Charley Stanceu (1916–1969) – baseball player
- Mark Suciu (born 1992) – professional skateboarder
- Otmar Szafnauer (born 1964) – Team Principal of the Alpine F1 Team
- Kevin Youkilis (born 1979) – Major League Baseball player; first baseman for the Boston Red Sox

== Law ==
- Alexander Bickel – legal scholar and expert on the United States Constitution (Romanian-Jewish descent)
- David Sam – senior judge of the United States District Court for the District of Utah
- Timothy Stanceu – chief United States judge of the United States Court of International Trade

== Media/journalism ==
- Rukmini Callimachi – journalist, The New York Times
- Chip Caray – sports broadcaster for Fox Sports South
- Harry Caray – former baseball broadcaster
- Liz Claman – anchor of the Fox Business Network show Countdown to the Closing Bell
- Horace Dediu – technology journalist
- Steve Fainaru – investigative journalist and senior writer for ESPN.com and ESPN The Magazine
- John Florea – photojournalist for Life magazine
- Lisa Kennedy – host of the Kennedy show on the Fox Business Network
- Dan Moldea – author and investigative journalist
- George Puscas – sports reporter for the Detroit Free Press
- Marc Stein – sports reporter for The New York Times (Romanian-Jewish descent)
- Brian Unger – journalist and commentator for NPR

== Military ==
- Nicolae Dunca – captain in the 12th New York Infantry Regiment in the American Civil War
- Eugen Ghica-Comănești – captain in the 5th New York Volunteer Infantry in the American Civil War
- George Pomutz – brevet brigadier general, commanded the 15th Iowa Infantry Regiment in the American Civil War
- Alexander Vraciu – World War II Navy pilot; ace

== Politics ==
- Steven Fulop – current mayor of Jersey City (Romanian-Jewish descent)
- Michael Gruitza – former Democratic member of the Pennsylvania House of Representatives
- Joseph Kissmann – former leader of the General Jewish Labour Bund in Romania, member of the Parliament of Romania
- Chris Lauzen – Illinois state senator of District 25 (1993–2013)
- Dan Negrea – United States Representative to the United Nations Economic and Social Council and an Alternate Representative of the United States to the United Nations General Assembly appointed by Donald Trump
- Mihaela Plesa – Texas state representative from District 70 (2023–)
- John Rakolta – former U.S. ambassador to the United Arab Emirates appointed by Donald Trump
- Ben Toma – 55th speaker of the Arizona House of Representatives
- Adrian Zuckerman – former U.S. ambassador to Romania appointed by Donald Trump, first U.S. ambassador born in Romania

== Religion ==
- John Michael Botean – Romanian Greek-Catholic bishop
- Nathaniel Popp – Romanian Orthodox archbishop
- Vasile Louis Puscas – Romanian Greek-Catholic bishop
- Alexander Ratiu – former Romanian Greek Catholic priest and author
- Valerian Trifa – former archbishop of Romanian Orthodox Church of America and Canada

== Sciences ==
- Rodica Baranescu – mechanical engineer known for her research in automotive diesel engines
- Adrian Bejan – mechanical engineer, Benjamin Franklin Medal laureate
- George de Bothezat – engineer, businessman, and pioneer of helicopter flight
- Mircea Dincă – chemist
- Diana Fosha – psychologist
- Viviana Gradinaru – neuroscientist
- Dan Graur – scientist
- Liviu Librescu – material scientist, and professor of Engineering Science and Mechanics at Virginia Tech
- Alexander Marmureanu – surgeon and academic
- Mihai Nadin – researcher in electrical engineering
- Horațiu Năstase – physicist and professor in the high energy physics group at Brown University
- Paul Negulescu – biologist
- George Emil Palade – Nobel Prize-winning biologist
- Sergiu Pașca – scientist and physician at Stanford University
- Vasile Popov – leading systems theorist and control engineering specialist
- Gideon Rodan – biochemist and osteopath
- Nicholas Sanduleak – astronomer
- Isaac Jacob Schoenberg – mathematician

=== Computer science ===
- Andrei Alexandrescu – computer scientist, worked as a research scientist at Facebook
- Maria-Florina Balcan – computer scientist
- Andrei Broder – computer scientist and distinguished scientist at Google
- Mihaela Cardei – computer scientist and researcher, professor at Florida Atlantic University
- Flaviu Cristian – computer scientist, noted for his work in distributed systems
- Roxana Geambasu – computer scientist and associate professor of computer science at Columbia University
- Virgil Gligor – computer scientist, professor of Electrical and Computer Engineering at Carnegie Mellon University, he has been inducted into the National Cybersecurity Hall of Fame
- Rada Mihalcea – computer scientist, professor of computer science and engineering at the University of Michigan
- Anca Mosoiu – computer scientist, credited with helping to build the tech industry in Oakland
- Fabian Pascal – computer scientist, consultant to large software vendors such as IBM, Oracle Corporation, and Borland
- Grigore Rosu – computer scientist, professor at the University of Illinois at Urbana-Champaign
- Daniela Rus – director of the MIT Computer Science and Artificial Intelligence Laboratory
- Ion Stoica – computer scientist, professor of computer science at the University of California Berkeley and co-director of AMPLab
- Matei Zaharia – computer scientist, creator of Apache Spark

== Writers ==
- Stefan Baciu – poet
- John Balaban – poet
- Cristina A. Bejan – writer
- Ion Cârja – writer and anti-communist activist
- Nina Cassian – poet, journalist, film critic
- Andrei Codrescu – poet, writer, radio host
- Norman Manea – writer
- Virgil Nemoianu – essayist, literary critic, and philosopher of culture
- Valery Oișteanu – poet, art critic, writer, essayist, and photographer
- Thomas Pavel – literary theorist, critic, and novelist currently teaching at the University of Chicago
- Michael Radu – political writer
- Saviana Stănescu – writer, poet, playwright
- Dorin Tudoran – poet, writer, journalist
- Elie Wiesel – writer, professor, political activist

== Comics writers ==
- Will Eisner – comics writer, artist, and entrepreneur (Romanian-Jewish descent)
- Sandu Florea – illustrator, comic book, and comic strip creator
- Elena Kucharik – illustrator
- Stan Lee – comic book writer, editor, publisher and former president and chairman of Marvel Comics (Romanian-Jewish descent)
- Saul Steinberg – cartoonist and illustrator (Romanian-Jewish descent)

== Others ==
- George Barris – photographer best known for his photographs of Marilyn Monroe
- Antoinette Bonner – jewel thief
- Scarlett Bordeaux – WWE wrestler
- Alexandra Botez – chess player
- Catherine Caradja – philanthropist, aristocrat, Romanian expatriate to the U.S.
- Misha Gabriel – dancer and choreographer
- Serban Ghenea – mixing engineer; has recorded and mixed tracks for artists including Adele, Stevie Wonder, Rod Stewart, Bruno Mars, and Taylor Swift
- Nicolae Miu – murderer
- Joe Oros – automobile designer for the Ford Motor Company
- Ion Mihai Pacepa – general of Securitate
- Mircea Răceanu – diplomat
- Vladimir Tismăneanu – specialist in political systems and comparative politics
- George W. Trippon – fashion designer and television host

== See also ==
- Romanian Canadians
