= William J. Burns (diplomat) =

American diplomat (born 1956)

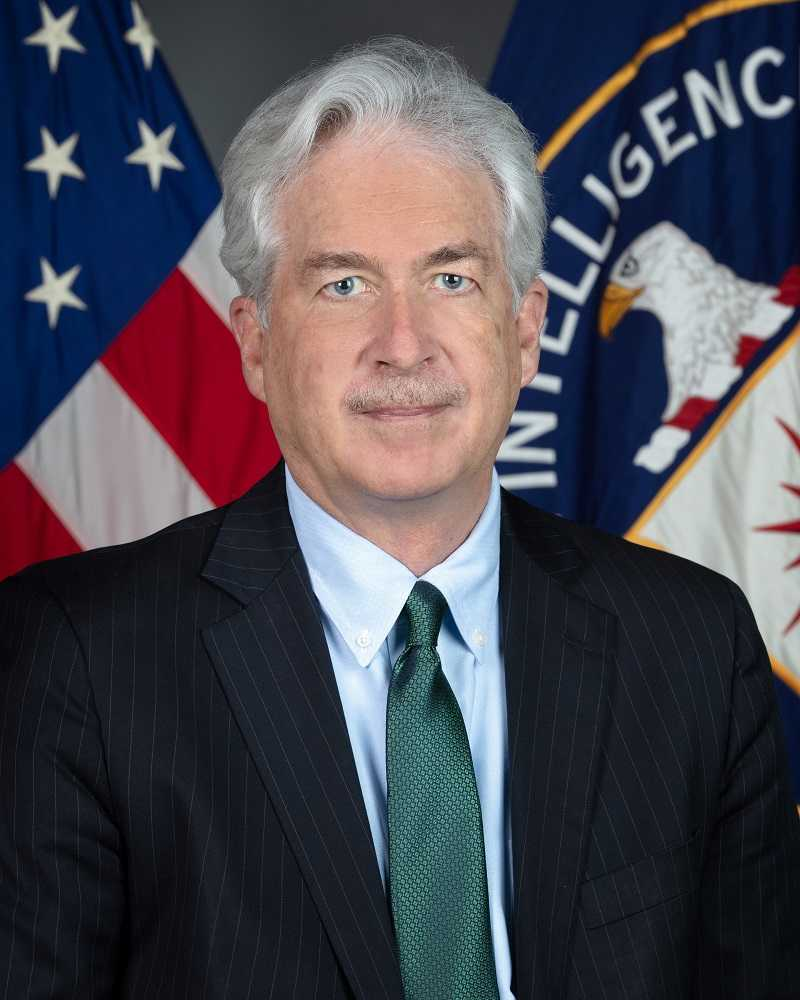
- Official portrait, 2021

8th Director of the Central Intelligence Agency
- In office March 19, 2021 – January 20, 2025
- President: Joe Biden
- Deputy: David S. Cohen
- Preceded by: Gina Haspel
- Succeeded by: John Ratcliffe

17th United States Deputy Secretary of State
- In office July 28, 2011 – November 3, 2014
- President: Barack Obama
- Preceded by: James Steinberg
- Succeeded by: Antony Blinken

Acting United States Secretary of State
- In office January 20, 2009 – January 21, 2009
- President: Barack Obama
- Deputy: John Negroponte
- Preceded by: John Negroponte (acting)
- Succeeded by: Hillary Clinton

20th Under Secretary of State for Political Affairs
- In office May 13, 2008 – July 28, 2011
- President: George W. Bush; Barack Obama
- Preceded by: R. Nicholas Burns
- Succeeded by: Wendy Sherman

United States Ambassador to Russia
- In office November 8, 2005 – May 13, 2008
- President: George W. Bush
- Preceded by: Alexander Vershbow
- Succeeded by: John Beyrle

Assistant Secretary of State for Near Eastern Affairs
- In office June 4, 2001 – March 2, 2005
- President: George W. Bush
- Preceded by: Edward S. Walker Jr.
- Succeeded by: David Welch

United States Ambassador to Jordan
- In office August 9, 1998 – June 4, 2001
- President: Bill Clinton; George W. Bush
- Preceded by: Wesley Egan
- Succeeded by: Edward Gnehm

17th Executive Secretary of the United States Department of State
- In office January 16, 1996 – February 27, 1998
- President: Bill Clinton
- Preceded by: Kenneth C. Brill
- Succeeded by: Kristie Kenney

Personal details
- Born: William Joseph Burns; April 11, 1956 (age 70) Fort Bragg, North Carolina, U.S.
- Party: Independent
- Spouse: Lisa Carty
- Children: 2
- Education: La Salle University (BA); St John's College, Oxford (MPhil, DPhil)
- Diplomatic service
- Allegiance: United States
- Service: U.S. Department of State
- Service years: 1982–2014
- Rank: Career Ambassador
- Burns's voice Burns on Russia's condition early in the invasion of Ukraine; Recorded March 8, 2022

William Joseph Burns (born April 11, 1956) is an American diplomat who served as the 8th director of the Central Intelligence Agency (CIA) during the Biden administration from March 19, 2021 to January 20, 2025. He previously served as U.S. deputy secretary of state from 2011 to 2014; in 2009 he served as acting secretary of state for a day, prior to the confirmation of Hillary Clinton. Burns retired from the U.S. Foreign Service in 2014 after a 32-year career. From 2014 to 2021, he served as president of the Carnegie Endowment for International Peace.

Burns served as ambassador to Jordan from 1998 to 2001, Assistant Secretary of State for Near East Affairs from 2001 to 2005, ambassador to Russia from 2005 to 2008 and Under Secretary of State for Political Affairs from 2008 to 2011.

In January 2021, President Joe Biden nominated Burns to become CIA director. He was unanimously confirmed by voice vote in the Senate on March 18, 2021, sworn in officially as director on March 19, as well as ceremonially sworn in by Vice President Kamala Harris on March 23. In July 2023, Biden elevated Burns to a position in his cabinet.

== Early life and education ==
Burns was born at Fort Bragg, North Carolina, in 1956. He is the son of Peggy Cassady and William F. Burns, who was a United States Army major general, a deputy assistant secretary of state for arms control, Bureau of Political-Military Affairs, director of the United States Arms Control and Disarmament Agency in 1988–1989 in the Ronald Reagan administration, in addition to his service as the first U.S. special envoy to denuclearization negotiations with former Soviet countries under the legislation sponsored by U.S. senators Sam Nunn and Richard Lugar.

Burns attended Trinity High School in Camp Hill, Pennsylvania, where he graduated valedictorian in 1973. He then studied history at La Salle University and graduated with honors in 1978. He was then awarded a Marshall Scholarship to study at the University of Oxford, becoming La Salle's first Marshall Scholar. He earned M.Phil. and D.Phil. degrees in international relations from St. John's College, Oxford. His D.Phil. thesis, Economic Aid and American Policy toward Egypt, 1955–1981, was completed in 1985.

While at Oxford, Burns was also a member of the men's basketball team.

== Career ==
=== U.S. Foreign Service ===
Burns entered the Foreign Service in 1982 and served as deputy secretary of state from 2011 to 2014. He had served as under secretary for political affairs from 2008 to 2011. He was ambassador to Russia from 2005 to 2008, assistant secretary of state for Near Eastern affairs from 2001 to 2005, and ambassador to Jordan from 1998 to 2001. He had also been Executive Secretary of the State Department and special assistant to secretaries of state Warren Christopher and Madeleine Albright, minister-counselor for political affairs at the U.S. Embassy in Moscow, acting director and principal deputy director of the State Department's Policy Planning Staff, as well as special assistant to the president and senior director for Near East and South Asian affairs at the United States National Security Council.

In 2008, Burns was nominated by President George W. Bush and confirmed by the Senate as a career ambassador, the highest rank in the U.S. Foreign Service, equivalent to a four-star general officer in the U.S. Armed Forces. Promotions to the rank are rare.

In 2008, Burns wrote to Secretary of State Condoleezza Rice: "Ukrainian entry into NATO is the brightest of all redlines for the Russian elite (not just Putin). In more than two and a half years of conversations with key Russian players, from knuckle-draggers in the dark recesses of the Kremlin to Putin's sharpest liberal critics, I have yet to find anyone who views Ukraine in NATO as anything other than a direct challenge to Russian interests."

A leaked diplomatic cable that Burns signed as ambassador to Russia in August 2006 provided a detailed eyewitness account of the lavish wedding organized in Makhachkala by Russian State Duma member and Dagestan Oil Company chief Gadzhi Makhachev for his son. The wedding lasted for two days; its attendees included Chechnya's Ramzan Kadyrov. An FSB colonel sitting next to the cable's authors tried to add "cognac" to their wine until an FSB general told him to stop. In 2015, Burns told Gideon Rachman of the Financial Times that the cable had been "largely written by his colleagues," with Rachman remarking that the telegram had gained a reputation of "a minor classic of comic writing, its tone very much not what one might expect of a diplomatic cable." In June 2013, Andrew Kuchins remarked about Burns's stint in Moscow, "It was a period when the relationship was deteriorating very significantly, but he was personally respected by Russian authorities as a consummate professional diplomat."

In 2013, Burns and Jake Sullivan led the secret bilateral channel with Iran that led to the interim agreement between Iran and the P5+1 and ultimately the Iran nuclear deal. Burns was reported to be "in the driver's seat" of the American negotiating team for the interim agreement. Burns had met secretly with Iranian officials as early as 2008, when President George W. Bush dispatched him to do so.

In a piece published in The Atlantic in April 2013, Nicholas Kralev praised him as the "secret diplomatic weapon" deployed against "some of the thorniest foreign policy challenges of the US."

Burns retired from the Foreign Service in 2014, later becoming president of the Carnegie Endowment for International Peace.

In November 2020, as Burns' name was being cited by press as one of several possible candidates to be nominated by Joe Biden for secretary of state, Russia's broadsheet Kommersant stated that its sources "in the state structures" of the Russian Federation agreed that his candidacy would "be the most advantageous for Moscow of all the five cited" in the media.

=== Director of the Central Intelligence Agency ===
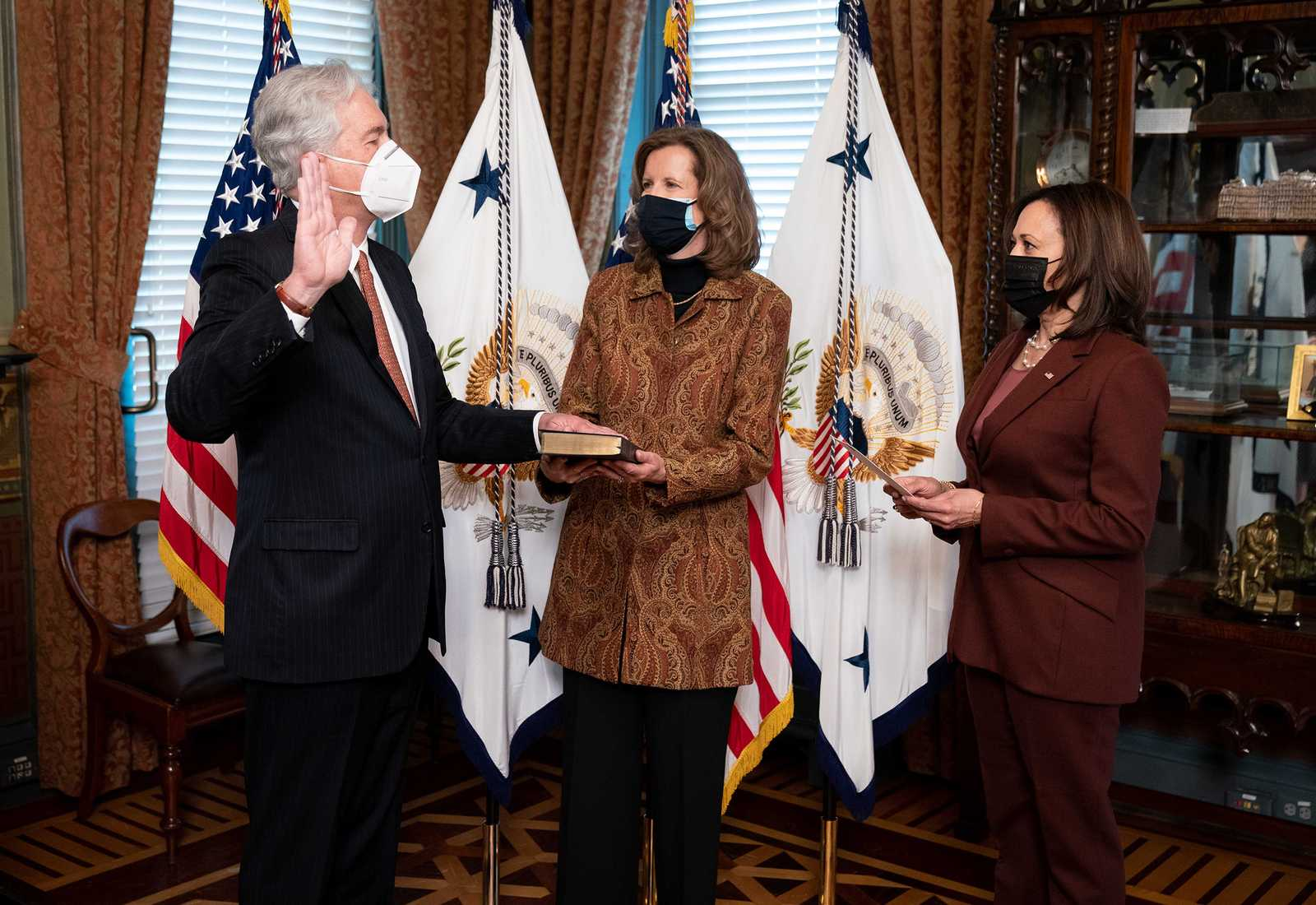
William Joseph Burns sworn in as CIA director by Kamala Harris in 2021

Burns discussing the CIA in the first episode of the agency's podcast, The Langley Files, in 2022

On January 11, 2021, Joe Biden announced he planned to nominate Burns as Director of the Central Intelligence Agency, saying Burns shared his belief "that intelligence must be apolitical and that the dedicated intelligence professionals serving our nation deserve our gratitude and respect".

On February 24, his nomination was well received in the confirmation hearing in the Senate. On March 2, the Senate Intelligence Committee unanimously approved Burns' nomination, setting him up for a final floor vote. On March 18, Burns was confirmed to the role with unanimous consent after Senator Ted Cruz (R-TX) lifted his hold on the nomination. He was officially sworn in as Director of the Central Intelligence Agency on March 19.

In his confirmation hearing before the Senate, Burns said, "an adversarial, predatory Chinese leadership poses our biggest geopolitical test". He said China was working to "methodically strengthen its capabilities to steal intellectual property, repress its own people, bully its neighbors, expand its global reach and build influence in American society."

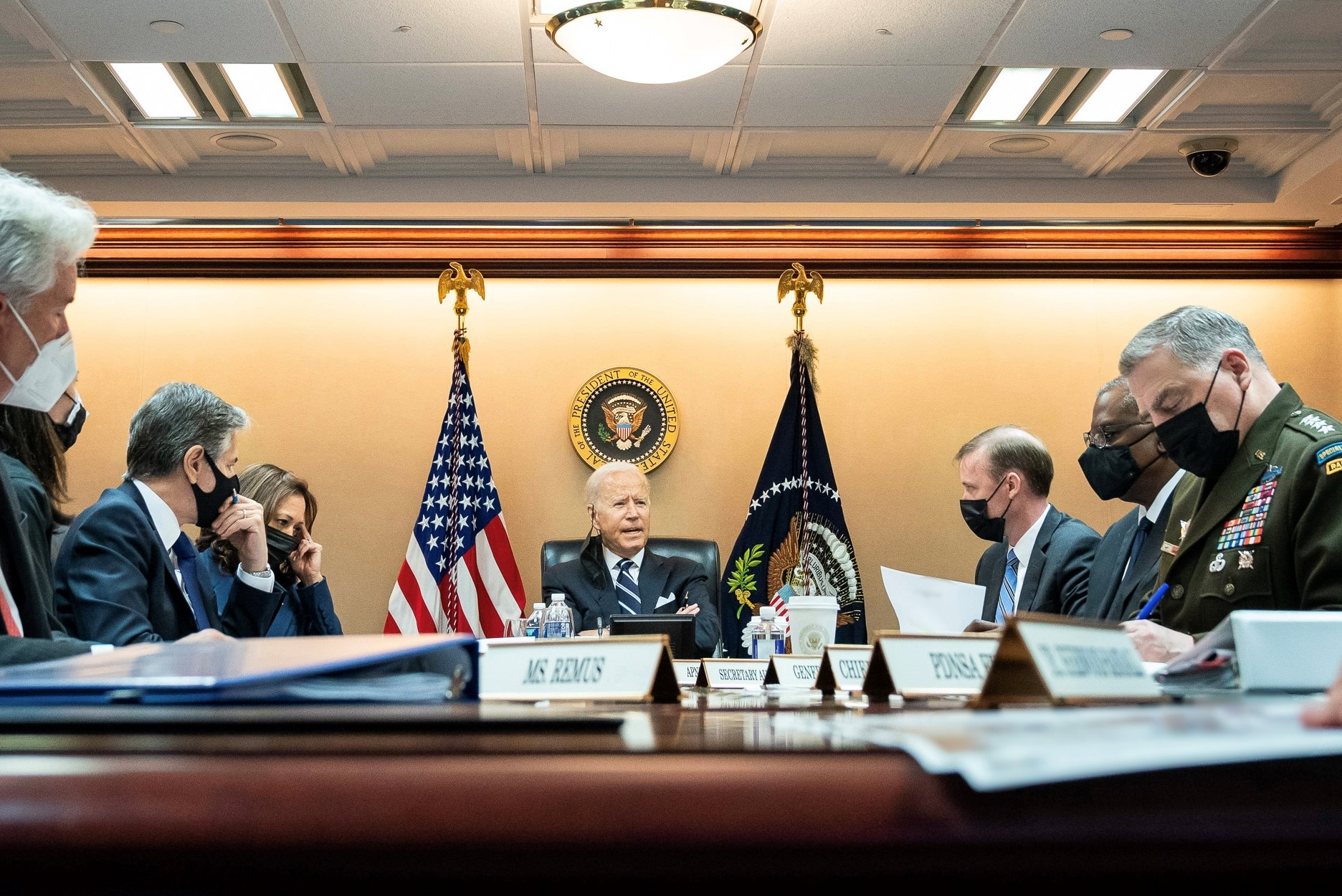
Burns sitting with President Joe Biden, Harris, and the U.S. national security team, August 18, 2021

In April 2021, Biden announced his intention to withdraw all regular U.S. troops from Afghanistan by September 2021. Burns told the U.S. Senate Intelligence Committee on April 14, 2021, that "[t]here is a significant risk once the U.S. military and the coalition militaries withdraw" but added that the U.S. would retain "a suite of capabilities." On August 23, 2021, Burns held a secret meeting in Kabul with Taliban leader Abdul Ghani Baradar, who returned to Afghanistan from exile in Qatar, to discuss the August 31 deadline for a U.S. military withdrawal from Afghanistan.

In early November 2021, Burns flew to Moscow, notifying Nikolai Patrushev, the secretary of Putin's security council, that the United States believed Putin was considering a full-scale invasion of Ukraine. Burns warned that if Putin were to invade Ukraine, the West would respond in a way that would have severe consequences for Russia. John Sullivan, at the time the American ambassador to Russia, recounted that Patrushev was undeterred by Burns' warnings. Upon his return to Washington, Burns informed Biden that Putin had all but made up his mind to take over Ukraine and that the Russians had absolute confidence victory would come swiftly.

On March 31, 2022, Burns tested positive for COVID-19, a day after meeting with President Biden during a socially distanced meeting at the White House.

In April 2022, Burns warned that Vladimir Putin's "desperation" over Russia's failures in Ukraine could lead to the use of tactical nuclear weapons or "low-yield nuclear weapons." That same month, Burns traveled to Saudi Arabia to meet with the crown prince and asked him to increase the country's oil production. They also discussed Saudi weapons purchases from China. On July 31, 2022, he oversaw the operation that killed the terrorist leader Ayman al-Zawahiri.

In May 2023, Burns made a secret visit to China to ease tensions with the country.

After the beginning of the Gaza war, in meetings with Israel's Mossad chief David Barnea, Burns pushed for a deal with Hamas to secure the release of Israeli and American hostages.

== Publications ==
=== Books ===
His memoir, The Back Channel: A Memoir of American Diplomacy and the Case for Its Renewal, was published by Random House in 2019. It was published in conjunction with an archive of nearly 100 declassified diplomatic cables. International relations scholars who reviewed the book were mostly positive.

=== Articles ===
- Spycraft and Statecraft, Foreign Affairs, January 30, 2024

=== Others ===
Burns' dissertation was published in 1985 as Economic Aid and American Policy Toward Egypt, 1955–1981.

== Awards ==
Burns is the recipient of three Presidential Distinguished Service Awards and several Department of State awards, including three Secretary's Distinguished Service Awards, the Secretary's Career Achievement Award, the Charles E. Cobb Jr. Award for Initiative and Success in Trade Development (2006), the Robert C. Frasure Memorial Award (2005), and the James Clement Dunn Award (1991). He also received the Department of Defense Award for Distinguished Public Service (2014), the U.S. Intelligence Community Medallion (2014), and the Central Intelligence Agency's Agency Seal Medal (2014).

In 1994, Burns was named to Time's lists of "50 Most Promising American Leaders Under Age 40" and "100 Most Promising Global Leaders Under Age 40". He was named Foreign Policy's "Diplomat of the Year" in 2013. He is the recipient of Anti-Defamation League's Distinguished Statesman Award (2014), the Middle East Institute's Lifetime Achievement Award (2014), and the American Academy of Diplomacy's Annenberg Award for Diplomatic Excellence (2015). Burns received the American Academy of Achievement's Golden Plate Award (2022).

Burns holds four honorary doctoral degrees and is a member of the American Academy of Arts and Sciences. He has also been an honorary Fellow at St John's College, Oxford since 2012.

=== Foreign government decorations ===
- Commandeur, Legion of Honour (France)
- Knight Commander, Order of Merit (Germany)
- Grand Cordon, Order of the Rising Sun (Japan)
- Marshall Medal (UK)
- Commendatore, Order of Merit (Italy)
- First Order, Al Kawkab Medal (Jordan)
- Commander with star, Royal Order of St Olav (Norway)

== Personal life ==
Burns is married to Lisa Carty, a former diplomat and current UN OCHA senior official, and has two daughters. He speaks English, French, Russian, and Arabic.

=== Jeffrey Epstein meetings ===
In 2023, The Wall Street Journal reported that Burns allegedly had three scheduled meetings with Jeffrey Epstein in 2014, according to 'documents' and 'calendars' in their possession. At the time, Burns was deputy secretary of state, and Epstein had already pleaded guilty to the charge of procuring for prostitution of a girl below age 18. A spokesperson for Burns told The Guardian that the two men had “no relationship”, with Burns seeking Epstein's advice as a “expert in the financial services sector”. Burns has not been accused of any wrongdoing related to Epstein, and said in 2026 that he “deeply regrets ever meeting with him”.

Political offices
| Preceded by Kenneth C. Brill | Executive Secretary of the United States Department of State; 1996–1998 | Succeeded by Kristie Kenney |
| Preceded by Edward S. Walker Jr. | Assistant Secretary of State for Near Eastern Affairs; 2001–2005 | Succeeded by David Welch |
| Preceded by R. Nicholas Burns | Under Secretary of State for Political Affairs; 2008–2011 | Succeeded by Tom Shannon; Acting |
| Preceded by James Steinberg | United States Deputy Secretary of State; 2011–2014 | Succeeded by Antony Blinken |
Diplomatic posts
| Preceded by Wesley Egan | United States Ambassador to Jordan; 1998–2001 | Succeeded by Edward Gnehm |
| Preceded by Alexander Vershbow | United States Ambassador to Russia; 2005–2008 | Succeeded by John Beyrle |
Government offices
| Preceded by Gina Haspel | Director of the Central Intelligence Agency; 2021–2025 | Succeeded by John Ratcliffe |
