= Samuel Damian =

- Born: Romania
- Occupation: Greek Catholic priest
- Known for: Electrical demonstrations

Samuel Damian (also spelled Samuil Domien) was an 18th-century Romanian Greek Catholic priest from Transylvania who emigrated to North America.

Damian's name first appears in 1748, when he placed an advertisement in the South Carolina Gazette announcing the electrical demonstrations he planned to give, and inviting the public to attend. Letters written in 1753 and 1755 by Benjamin Franklin attest to the fact that the two had met, and had carried on discussions in Latin concerning electricity.

Before settling in Charleston, South Carolina, Damian spent time in Maryland, North Carolina and Virginia.

After living for some years in South Carolina, he traveled to Jamaica, and after that his name disappears from historical records.

== See also ==
- Romanian Americans
- List of Romanian Americans
