= List of cathedrals in Ohio =

This is a list of cathedrals in the state of Ohio, United States:

Municipality	Cathedral	Image	Location & References
Canton	St. George Cathedral (Romanian Catholic)		40°50′44″N 81°21′34″W
Cincinnati	Cathedral Basilica of Saint Peter in Chains (Roman Catholic)		39°06′14″N 84°31′09″W
Cincinnati	Christ Church Cathedral (Episcopal)		39°06′03″N 84°30′27″W
Cleveland	Cathedral of St. John the Evangelist (Roman Catholic)		41°30′10″N 81°41′18″W
Cleveland	Trinity Cathedral (Episcopal)		41°30′04″N 81°40′28″W
Cleveland	St. Theodosius Cathedral (Orthodox Church in America)		41°28′38″N 81°40′54″W
Cleveland	St. Mary's Cathedral (Romanian Orthodox Church)		41°27′53″N 81°48′00″W
Cleveland Heights (Cleveland area)	Saints Constantine and Helen Cathedral (Greek Orthodox)		41°31′08″N 81°33′34″W
Columbus	St. Joseph Cathedral (Roman Catholic)		39°57′46″N 82°59′40″W
Columbus	Annunciation Cathedral (Greek Orthodox)		39°58′24″N 83°00′10″W
Olmsted Falls (Cleveland area)	Annunciation Cathedral (Romanian Orthodox)		41°23′09″N 81°55′22″W
Parma (Cleveland area)	Cathedral of St. John the Baptist (Byzantine Catholic)		41°24′14″N 81°41′34″W
Parma (Cleveland area)	St. Josaphat Cathedral (Ukrainian Catholic)		41°24′25″N 81°42′45″W
Parma (Cleveland area)	St. Sava Cathedral (Serbian Orthodox)		41°23′33″N 81°41′18″W
Parma (Cleveland area)	St. Vladimir's Cathedral (Ukrainian Orthodox Church of the USA)		41°24′06″N 81°42′36″W
Parma (Cleveland area)	St. Sergius Cathedral (Russian Orthodox Church Outside Russia)		41°23′14″N 81°41′09″W
Reynoldsburg (Columbus area)	Cathedral of the Dormition of the Virgin Mary (Macedonian Orthodox) (not in communion with the Ecumenical Patriarch)		39°58′40″N 82°47′31″W
Rossford (Toledo area)	St. George Cathedral (Orthodox Church in America)		41°35′29″N 83°33′32″W
Steubenville	Holy Name Cathedral (Roman Catholic)		40°21′20″N 80°37′10″W
Strongsville	Mother of God Zyrovichy Orthodox Cathedral (Belarusian Orthodox)		41°19′52″N 81°48′05″W
Toledo	Our Lady, Queen of the Most Holy Rosary Cathedral (Roman Catholic)		41°40′21″N 83°33′22″W
Toledo	Holy Trinity Cathedral (Greek Orthodox)		41°39′23″N 83°31′45″W
Youngstown	St. Columba Cathedral (Roman Catholic)		41°06′12″N 80°39′04″W

== See also ==
- List of cathedrals in the United States
