= St. George Cathedral (Canton, Ohio) =

- St. George Cathedral
- 40°50′45.3″N 81°21′35.96″W
- Location: 1121 44th St. NE; Canton, Ohio
- Country: United States
- Denomination: Romanian Greek Catholic

History
- Founded: 1912
- Dedicated: 1975

Architecture
- Style: Modern

Administration
- Diocese: Eparchy of St. George's in Canton

Clergy
- Bishop: Most Rev. John Michael Botean
- Rector: Very Rev. Ovidiu Mărginean

St. George Cathedral is a Romanian Catholic cathedral located in Canton, Ohio, United States. It is the seat of the Eparchy of St. George's in Canton.

== History ==
Romanian immigrants started to arrive in the Canton area at the turn of the Twentieth Century. Romanian Catholics formed St. George parish in 1912 and the present church was dedicated in 1975. It became a cathedral when the Apostolic Exarchate of United States of America was formed for Romanian Catholics in 1982.

== See also ==
- List of cathedrals in Ohio
- List of Catholic cathedrals in the United States
- List of cathedrals in the United States
