= America's Other Army =

Book covering visits to foreign American embassies

America's Other Army: The U.S. Foreign Service and 21st-Century Diplomacy
- First edition cover
- Author: Nicholas Kralev
- Language: English
- Genre: Non-fiction
- Publisher: CreateSpace
- Publication date: 2012
- Publication place: United States

America's Other Army: The U.S. Foreign Service and 21st-Century Diplomacy is a book by Nicholas Kralev. Its first edition was published in 2012, and its second edition in 2015.

The book is based on the author's visits to 77 American embassies and consulates over more than a decade, and interviews with about 600 diplomats, including eight U.S. secretaries of state: John Kerry, Hillary Clinton, Condoleezza Rice, Colin Powell, Madeleine Albright, Warren Christopher, James Baker and George Shultz.

The author, who is a former Financial Times and Washington Times correspondent, discussed this book on BBC in January 2013 and PBS in March 2013.
