= List of United States representatives to the United Nations Economic and Social Council =

United States diplomatic position

Permanent Representative of the United States to the United Nations Economic and Social Council
- Seal of the United States Department of State

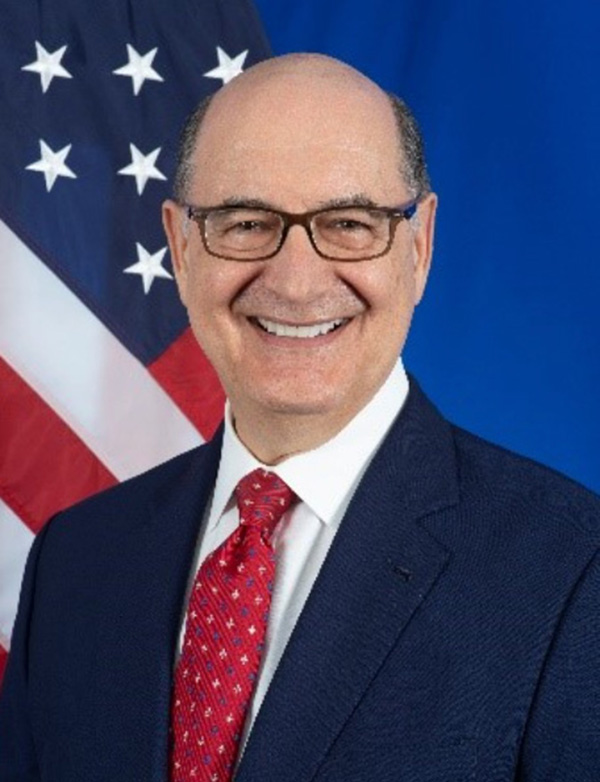
- Incumbent; Dan Negrea since October 2025
- Reports to: United States Ambassador to the United Nations
- Nominator: President of the United States
- Term length: No fixed term At the pleasure of the president of the United States

The following is a list of U.S. ambassadors to the United Nations Economic and Social Council. The formal title is United States representative to the United Nations Economic and Social Council with the rank of Ambassador during tenure of service.

== U.S. Representatives to the United Nations Economic and Social Council ==
Ambassador	Image	Assumed office	Left office
Preston Hotchkis		1954	1955
Alan Keyes		1983	1985
Victor Marrero		1993	1997
Betty E. King		1998	Early 2000's
Sichan Siv		2001	2006
Richard T. Miller		2006	2007
Frederick D. Barton		2009	2011
Elizabeth M. Cousens		2012	2014
Sarah E. Mendelson		2015	2017
Kelley Eckels Currie		2017	2019
Lisa Carty		March 2022	January 20, 2025
Dan Negrea		October 2025	present
