= The Back Channel: A Memoir of American Diplomacy and the Case for Its Renewal =

2019 book by William J. Burns

The Back Channel
- Author: William J. Burns
- Language: English
- Subject: American diplomacy
- Genre: Memoir
- Publisher: Random House
- Publication date: 2019
- Publication place: United States
- Pages: 544
- ISBN: 978-0-525-50886-1

The Back Channel: A Memoir of American Diplomacy and the Case for Its Renewal is a memoir by United States diplomat William J. Burns, published on April 16, 2019. The book traces his four-decade career in the United States Foreign Service, including his service as Deputy Secretary of State and as United States Ambassador to Russia and Jordan.

The title refers to back-channel diplomacy, informal and often confidential communication conducted outside official, public channels.

The book is accompanied by an online archive of declassified documents at the Carnegie Endowment for International Peace.

== Synopsis ==
The Back Channel is structured as a chronological memoir of William J. Burns's 33-year career in the United States Foreign Service. Drawing on newly declassified cables and memoranda, Burns narrates his progression from junior postings in the 1980s to senior roles as ambassador, under secretary of state, and deputy secretary of state.

The early chapters describe his training as a diplomat and his work on the end of the Cold War, German unification and the first post-Soviet years in Moscow. Subsequent sections follow his tenure as U.S. ambassador to Jordan, his involvement in Arab–Israeli diplomacy, and his efforts to manage relations with Russia during the turbulent Yeltsin and Putin periods.

Burns devotes substantial space to U.S. policy in the broader Middle East after 11 September 2001. He recounts internal debates over the invasion of Iraq and later describes the negotiations that led Libya to abandon its programmes for weapons of mass destruction. Later chapters focus on his role in the secret back-channel talks with Iran in Oman and the multilateral diplomacy that produced the Joint Comprehensive Plan of Action in 2015.

The book concludes with a programmatic chapter in which Burns argues that U.S. foreign policy has become overly militarised since the end of the Cold War. He calls for renewed investment in professional diplomacy, for a clearer articulation of the limits of U.S. power, and for what he terms a “pivotal” but not dominant American role in a more crowded international system.

== Reception ==
According to Walter Russell Meadt in Foreign Affairs, the book describes the "serial failures by Democratic and Republican presidents that, in Burns’ judgment, contributed to the United States’ current distress." Mead argues that Burns’ proposals, "including pruning back what he sees as an overgrown National Security Council and building public support for diplomacy", merit serious consideration. Kirkus Reviews characterizes the work as a “resounding defense of American diplomacy and the need for negotiation in a non–zero-sum world” and recommends it as “excellent reading for students of contemporary geopolitics and recent American history”. Publisher Random House presents the book as "a powerful reminder, in a time of great turmoil, of the enduring importance of diplomacy."

Writing in The Washington Post, columnist David Ignatius characterized The Back Channel as a “masterful diplomatic memoir” and praised Burns as “the very best diplomatic representative that America had in the years leading up to the great unraveling,” while noting the limits of what even a senior insider could do to prevent major policy mistakes, referring to the Iraq war, NATO expansion, and Syria.

...it’s painful that Burns, the best and brightest, couldn’t prevent the chain of error that helped undo the American century.

In academic circles the memoir has been used both as a primary source and as an interpretation of recent U.S. foreign policy. In 2019 the H-Diplo/ISSF network devoted a forum (Roundtable 11–8) to the book, with an introduction by Elizabeth C. Charles and James Graham Wilson and review essays by Susan Colbourn, James Goldgeier, Bruce W. Jentleson and James H. Lebovic, followed by a reply from Burns.

- Susan Colbourn emphasizes two interlocking themes in the memoir: the possibilities of American diplomacy and the constraints imposed by domestic politics. She highlights Burns's closing chapters, which argue for a clearer sense of strategy and of historical perspective in U.S. foreign policy, and notes his recurring insistence on the limits of diplomatic “agency” in the face of structural forces.
- James Goldgeier underlines the value of the book as a narrative of post–Cold War U.S. foreign policy, highlighting Burns's vivid portraits of key actors, especially Vladimir Putin, and his account of the rise and deterioration of U.S.–Russian relations. He focuses in particular on Burns's critical analysis of NATO enlargement and the 2008 Bucharest summit, arguing that the memoir is a useful resource for understanding how Washington misperceived Russian sensitivities and alliance politics at the time.
- Bruce W. Jentleson reads The Back Channel as a strong case for diplomacy understood as strategy rather than mere process, citing Burns's chapters on Libya and Iran as especially instructive for students of coercive diplomacy. At the same time, he criticizes the book for being less specific than he would wish on future policy: Burns calls for a greater U.S. focus on Asia, better governance in the Arab world and renewed engagement in climate diplomacy but offers relatively few concrete prescriptions. Burns seems to be "over-extrapolating from the world of the second half of the twentieth century" and underestimating the complexity and variety of the twenty-first-century international system, including the "re-opening of ideological competition between democracy and various forms of authoritarianism". He recommends Hedley Bull's conception of ‘anarchical society’ and his historical perspective to sharpen the analysis.
- James H. Lebovic stresses Burns's argument about the post-9/11 militarization of U.S. foreign policy and the resulting neglect of diplomacy's “quiet” successes. He notes that Burns acknowledges his own share of responsibility for policy failures, including the Iraq War, and praises the book's discussion of how diplomacy often works unseen to avert crises. At the same time, Lebovic questions whether Burns sometimes overstates the capacity of the United States to shape complex conflicts, for example in Syria or in the wider Middle East, and doubts that different U.S. choices would necessarily have produced markedly better outcomes.

Burns's response to the roundtable reiterates that he intended the book both as an argument for the continued relevance of diplomacy and as a documentary resource. By releasing a large set of declassified cables and memoranda alongside the memoir, he presents his account as open to verification and as a starting point for further research on the recent history of U.S. foreign policy.

== Awards ==
In 2019, the book received the Douglas Dillon Book Award of the American Academy of Diplomacy, presented at the academy's annual awards luncheon in Washington, D.C.

== See also ==
- William J. Burns (diplomat)
- Backchannel diplomacy
- Joint Comprehensive Plan of Action

== Literature ==
- William J. Burns: The Back Channel: A Memoir of American Diplomacy and the Case for Its Renewal. Random House, March 12, 2019. ISBN 978-0-525-50886-1 (hardcover edition)
