= Electrical demonstration =

Electrical demonstrations during the eighteenth century were performances by experimental philosophers before an audience to entertain with and teach about electricity. Such displays took place in British America as well across Europe. Their form varied from something similar to modern day carnival shows to grand displays in exhibition halls and theatres. With concern about safety of electrical power, these displays were sometimes pushed back upon.

== History ==
=== Ebenezer Kinnersley ===
Ebenezer Kinnersley was one of the first showmen of electricity in British America, touring his electrical displays from 1749 to 1774. His lectures of electrical phenomena did not only show natural phenomena to the audience, but instead were interactive demonstrations that required their active participation. In Kinnersley's shows, audience members were able to have some embodied experience with electricity.

One of two Kinnersley's two touring electrical demonstrations focused on “the newly discovered electrical fire.” An audience member of this show would have the opportunity to directly interact with electricity in several different types of demonstrations. In one part of the show they could witness the attraction between positive and negative forces, using a leyden jar. In another, a charged coin would be placed in someone's mouth, then using an electrical discharge, Kinnersley would propel the coin across the room. The demonstration of the electrical fire allowed sparks to seemingly fly from participants fingers, lips or eyes. Kinnersley believed this method of electric display, relying on the physical senses, would better allow his audience to understand electrical phenomena.

These demonstrations did not come without a price – admission typically cost about five shillings a person, well above a day's worth of work for most laborers of the mid-eighteenth century. Still, persons of all socioeconomic classes were drawn to such curious displays, Kinnersley's advertisements touting exhibitions of wonder and spectacular displays. Kinnersley toured as an itinerant across British America, taking his displays to colleges, courthouses and coffee houses.

These spectacles of electricity were not intended only to teach, but also to entertain Kinnersley's audience. In this way, Kinnersley's shows served as a basis for similar scientists to promote their and further understanding of their practices to the masses, such as Archibald Spencer, Henry Moyes and Samuel Domjen, who took such electrical demonstrations throughout Europe.

== Other types of electrical displays ==
=== Exhibitions ===
Electricity was on display at the International Exposition of Electricity in Paris in 1881. The Times reported a few electrical accidents that resulted in fires. Though noting that such incidents aroused some alarm at the exhibition, the editorial sought to play down the events in effort to preserve the competence of the event. After about at least five electrical fires they were no longer able to directly discuss the danger of electricity when not properly demonstrated or attended to.

In 1882, following the electrical accidents of the International Exhibition, there was a desire to utilize the electrical exhibition of the Crystal Palace to redeem the public's conception of electricity as safe, reliable and economical. This was not without some initial fear that the dangers of electricity would follow, the exhibition opening nearly a month behind schedule to ensure that safety precautions were taken.

The British Edison Company took a special interest in the safe display of electricity. The Edison Company displayed a miniature version of its entire distribution system within the Crystal Palace. Additionally, they pushed the use of low-voltage incandescent lights as a low hazard.

During the exhibition there were no reported electrical accidents, to the success of the technology's proponents. Further, the Times featured Edison's novel displays as a marvelous part of the Palace exhibition and featuring two images of the displays out of eight total included from the Palace exhibits.

=== Theatrical displays ===
In theatrical performances the use of decorative electricity was used in costumes of female performers. Richard d’Oyly Carte’s Savoy Theatre in London was one of the first to use electric ornamentation during performances.

== See also ==
- Experiments and Observations on Electricity
