= Track II diplomacy =

Conflict resolution by non-state actors

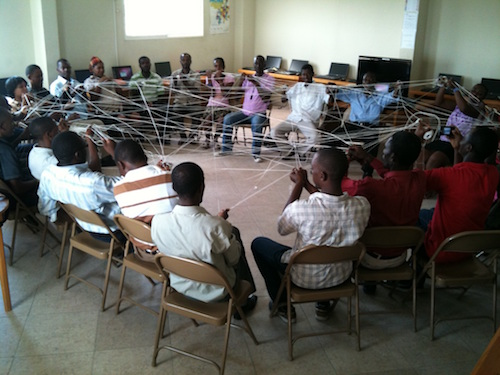
A workshop for peacebuilding skills in Haiti, 2013.

Track II diplomacy is the practice of non-state actors using conflict resolution tactics (such as workshops and conversations) to "[lower] the anger or tension or fear that exists" between conflicting groups.

These "non-governmental, informal and unofficial contacts" host activities to improve communication and understanding between citizens, such as through workshops and conversations.

According to American peace activist Joseph V. Montville, who coined the term, track I diplomacy entails official, governmental diplomacy between nations, such as negotiations conducted by professional diplomats. Track II diplomacy refers to conflict resolution efforts by practitioners and theorists. These efforts involve "improved communication" to further "a better understanding of [conflicting groups'] point of view".

== History ==
In 1981, Joseph V. Montville, then a U.S. State Department employee, coined the phrases track one and track two diplomacy in "Foreign Policy According to Freud," which appeared in Foreign Policy.

The efforts of these conflict resolution professionals, generally operating through non-governmental organizations (NGOs) and universities, arose from the realization by diplomats and others that formal official government-to-government interactions were not necessarily the most effective methods for securing international cooperation or resolving differences.

Track two diplomacy is unofficial, non-structured interaction. It is always open minded, often altruistic, and ... strategically optimistic, based on best case analysis. Its underlying assumption is that actual or potential conflict can be resolved or eased by appealing to common human capabilities to respond to good will and reasonableness. Scientific and cultural exchanges are examples of track two diplomacy. The problem most political liberals fail to recognize is that reasonable and altruistic interaction with foreign countries cannot be an alternative to traditional track one diplomacy, with its official posturing and its underlying threat of the use of force. Both tracks are necessary for psychological reasons and both need each other.

Montville (Davidson & Montville, 1981) maintains that there are two basic processes in track two diplomacy. The first consists of facilitated workshops that bring members of conflicting groups together to develop personal relationships, understand the conflict from the perspective of others, and develop joint strategies for solving the conflict. The second process involves working to shift public opinion: "Here the task is a psychological one which consists of reducing the sense of victim hood of the parties and rehumanizing the image of the adversary."

Montville emphasized that Track Two Diplomacy is not a substitute for Track One Diplomacy, but compensates for the constraints imposed on leaders by their people's psychological expectations. However, track two diplomacy is not a replacement for track one diplomacy. Rather, it is there to assist official actors to manage and resolve conflicts by exploring possible solutions derived from the public view, without the requirements of formal negotiation. In addition, the term track 1.5 diplomacy is used by some analysts to define a situation where official and non-official actors cooperate in conflict resolution. Most important, Track Two Diplomacy is intended to provide a bridge or complement official Track One negotiations.

Methods for conducting these activities are still evolving as is the thinking around which individuals—representing various roles and functions in society and government—should be included. Montville points out that "there is no evidence that conflict resolution workshops would work for the principal political leaders themselves—perhaps because they are too tough or even impervious to the humanizing process." John McDonald (Sep 2003–Aug 2004) seconds this assumption but feels that it is merely because the leaders are stuck in rigid roles and politically have less access to fluidity than individuals further removed from the top echelon of government (McDonald, Sep 2003–Aug 2004).

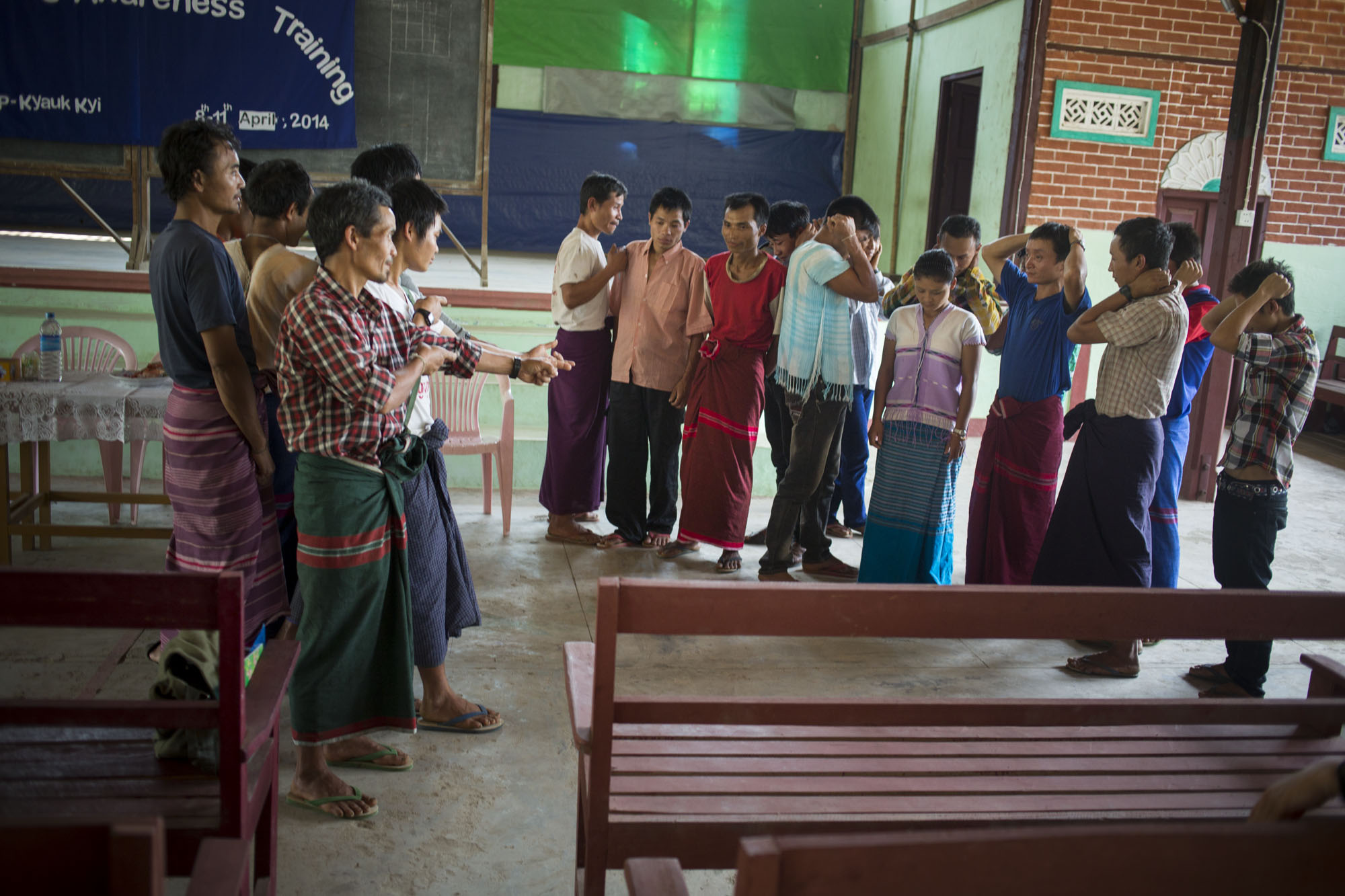
A peacebuilding workshop for Karen peoples in 2014 comprised representatives from 27 Myanmar villages. Contentious topics included resettlement, land seizure, higher education, health issues, and business opportunities.

In 1986 John McDonald and Diane Bendahmane (1987) produced Conflict Resolution: Track Two Diplomacy, a book that compiled the thoughts of several Track One and Track Two professionals confirming the need for government to support, encourage, and work with Track Two. The Department of State refused to print the book for eighteen months because the Department has a strong defensiveness regarding its right, ability, and authority to conduct conflict resolution. The book was finally published in 1987 and states that

The official government apparatus for analyzing international security issues and designing foreign policy has to equip itself to support and benefit from track two diplomacy. As part of the process, government analysts must improve their capabilities to understand how history, society, culture, and psychology interact.

At a special briefing for representatives of non-governmental organizations, the U.S. Department of State's Deputy Director for Political Affairs in the Office of Iraq presented a plea for help from NGOs (Paul Sutphin, 2004). Acting under Secretary Colin Powell's initiative and authority, the State Department's Iraqi analysts explained their frustrations in conducting dialogue, developing grassroots relationships, and rebuilding infrastructure. Far from admitting that the State Department was limited in its right, ability, and authority to conduct conflict resolution, they admitted that they couldn't build relationships or spend money fast enough to rebuild Iraq in time to appease the Iraqis and needed help to do it. This may not be the ideal situation in terms of NGO and State Department cooperation.

"Further Exploration of Track Two Diplomacy" was published in 1991 as an Occasional Paper (McDonald), and as a chapter in Timing the De-Escalation of International Conflicts (Kriesberg & Thorson, 1991). Moreover, in the same year, "The Arrow and the Olive Branch," which was written as an article in The Psychodynamics of International Relations, Montville adds the third process in track two diplomacy. Aside from previous two processes of facilitating small workshops and influencing public opinion, he claims that the third process is cooperative economic development. Although it may not seem essential to conflict resolution, it is meaningful in the sense that it provides incentives, institutional support, and continuity to the political and psychological processes.

In 1996 Dr. Louise Diamond and John McDonald published Multi-Track Diplomacy: A Systems Approach to Peace. Since then the model has been more robustly developed and the original second track has been expanded into nine tracks: peacemaking through diplomacy, conflict resolution, commerce, personal involvement, learning, advocacy, religion, funding, information.

Some of the successful track two dialogue processes:

- The Oslo Accords of 1993 between Israel and the Palestine Liberation Organization (PLO), which achieved some remarkable breakthroughs in the Israeli–Palestinian relationship. The contacts began as a track two diplomacy, with an unofficial initiative by a Norwegian scholar, but had transitioned into track one diplomacy by the time it was finished, finalized with a handshake between Israeli Prime Minister Yitzhak Rabin and PLO head Yasser Arafat on the White House lawn.
- The Institute for Multi-Track Diplomacy (IMTD), founded by former U.S. Ambassador John W. McDonald, conducted sustained Track II engagement in Cyprus from the 1990s through the 2000s, training more than 2,500 Greek and Turkish Cypriots in conflict resolution over eight years. Following years of Track II engagement, the deputy prime minister of the Turkish Cypriot north raised the gates on the Green Line, enabling Cypriots from both communities to move freely between the two sides.
- The sustained Jewish-Palestinian Living Room Dialogue Group which begun in 1992. From 2003 to 2007 it partnered with Camp Tawonga to bring hundreds of adults and youth from 50 different towns in Palestine and Israel to successfully live and communicate together at the Palestinian-Jewish Family Peacemakers Camp—Oseh Shalom – Sanea al-Salam.

== See also ==
- Hostelling International
- Shuttle diplomacy
- The Back Channel: A Memoir of American Diplomacy and the Case for Its Renewal

== General and cited references ==
- Davidson, W. D., and J. V. Montville, "Foreign Policy According to Freud," Foreign Policy, Vol. 45, Winter 1981–1982.
- Diamond, L., & McDonald, J. (1991). Multi-Track Diplomacy: A Systems Guide and Analysis. Iowa Peace Institute.
- Diamond, L., & McDonald, J. W. (1996). Multi-Track Diplomacy: A Systems Approach to Peace. West Hartford, CT: Kumarian Press.
- Gelder, M. (2006). Meeting the Enemy, Becoming a Friend. Bauu Institute. ISBN 0-9721349-5-6
- Gopin, M. (2009). To Make the Earth Whole: The Art of Citizen Diplomacy in an Age of Religious Militancy. Rowman & Littlefield Publishers.
- Kaye, D. D. (2007). Talking to the enemy: Track two diplomacy in the Middle East and South Asia. Rand Corporation.
- McDonald, J. W., &Bendahmane, D. B. (Eds.). (1987). Conflict Resolution: Track Two Diplomacy. Foreign Service Institute, US Dept. of State.
- McDonald, J. W. (1991). "Further exploration of track two diplomacy." Timing the De-escalation of International Conflicts, 201–220.
- Montville, J. (1991). "Track Two Diplomacy: The Arrow and the Olive Branch." The Psychodynamics of International Relations, 2.
- Montville, J. V. (2006). "Track two diplomacy: The work of healing history." Whitehead J. Dipl. & Int'l Rel., 7, 15.
- Stone, D. (2011). "The ASEAN-ISIS network: interpretive communities, informal diplomacy and discourses of region." Minerva, 49(2), 241–262.
- Sutphin, P. (2004). Deputy Director for Political Affairs, Office of Iraq, Bureau of Near Eastern Affairs briefing on: The Transition of Power in Iraq. 29 Jul 2004. Washington, DC: US Department of State.
- Homans, C. (2011). Track II Diplomacy: A Short History. Foreign Policy.
