= TLC (TV network) =

American multinational pay television channel

- Country: United States
- Broadcast area: United States; Canada
- Headquarters: Silver Spring, Maryland, United States

Programming
- Languages: English; Spanish (via SAP audio track)
- Picture format: 1080i HDTV (downscaled to letterboxed 480i for the SDTV feed)

Ownership
- Owner: Skydance Corporation
- Parent: Skydance TV
- Sister channels: see list of assets owned by Skydance Corporation

History
- Launched: October 1980; 46 years ago
- Former names: ACSN – The Learning Channel (1980–1983); The Learning Channel (1984–1998)

Links
- Website: www.tlc.com

Availability

Streaming media
- Affiliated streaming service: HBO Max
- Service(s): Philo, Sling TV, YouTube TV, Hulu + Live TV, Vidgo

TLC is an American premium multinational cable and satellite television network owned by Skydance Corporation. First established in 1980 as The Learning Channel, it initially focused on educational and instructional programming. By the late 1990s, after an acquisition by Discovery, Inc. earlier in the decade, the network began to pivot towards reality television programming—predominantly focusing on programming involving lifestyles and personal stories—to the point that the previous name with "The Learning Channel" spelled out was phased out in favor of its initialism.

As of November 2023, with its programming primarily dedicated to the nine-series 90 Day Fiancé universe, comprising 31% of the shows carried by the channel, TLC is available to approximately 71,000,000 pay television households in the United States—down from its 2011 peak of 100,000,000 households.

== History ==
=== 1972–1980: Early history as the Appalachian Educational Satellite Project ===
TLC's history traces to the 1972 formation of the Appalachian Educational Satellite Project (AESP), a distance education project formed by the Appalachian Regional Commission (ARC), in participation with the Education Satellite Communication Demonstration (ESCD), a partnership with the Department of Health, Education, and Welfare and NASA intended to transmit instructional, career and health programming via satellite to provide televised educational material to public schools and universities in the Appalachian region. ARC submitted a proposal to participate in the ESCD and use the ATS-6 communications satellite (launched into orbit in 1974) to disseminate "career education" programming to teachers at no cost; the consortium set up 15 earth station receiver sites across eight states in conjunction with local education service agencies.

The ATS-6 temporarily ceased service to the Appalachian region after being re-orbited to India in September 1975; by the time the satellite reoriented to the United States the following year, the number of earth receivers used to transmit AESP content increased to 45 sites in Pennsylvania, Kentucky, Maryland, Virginia, West Virginia, Tennessee, Alabama, Georgia, North Carolina and South Carolina (some of which also acted as relays to local television stations in the region). All programming offered through the project was accepted for academic credit at 12 universities in the region. In October 1978, NASA disclosed the ATS-6 would suspend transmissions for 12 months due to transmission problems with the satellite. As a result, ARC decided to purchase transponder time on the commercial Satcom I communications satellite, in order to continue its distance education offerings.

=== 1980–1998: From ACSN to The Learning Channel, "A place for learning minds" ===
The non-profit Appalachian Community Service Network (ACSN) was incorporated in April 1980, maintaining a board of directors appointed by the Appalachian Regional Commission. The ACSN television service launched in October 1980 as ACSN – The Learning Channel; unlike the closed-circuit AESP, the network distributed its programming available directly to cable systems for home viewing. Its programming also expanded to include "informational" content. (NASA immediately launched NASA TV as the ACSN's internal replacement.) By 1982, ACSN claimed that it "achieved the fastest rate of growth of all basic cable programming services", with availability on around 70 cable affiliates reaching 1.5 million subscribers; by this point, 70 universities granted academic credit for telecourses carried on the network. On January 1, 1984, the network shortened its name to The Learning Channel.

The channel mostly featured documentary content pertaining to nature, science, history, current events, medicine, technology, cooking, home improvement, and other information-based topics. A notable example of such programming was Sew, What's New?, a fashion design show presented by George W. Trippon. These were more focused, more technical, and of a more academic nature than the content that was being broadcast at the time on its eventual rival, The Discovery Channel, which launched in 1985. TLC was geared toward an inquisitive and narrow audience during this time, and had modest ratings. An exception to this viewership commonality was Captain's Log (produced and hosted by Mark Graves, also known as Captain Mark Gray), a weekly primetime boating safety series that aired from 1987 to 1990; the program often achieved between a 4.5 to 6 rating share and was the highest compensated series in the history of TLC with over 30 times the compensation of any other series on the network.

In 1986, Infotech, Inc.—then-owner of the Financial News Network (FNN)—acquired a 51% interest in The Learning Channel for $3 million; the American Community Service Network retained a 31.5% share of the network, with the remaining 17.5% owned by network management.

On February 15, 1991, The Discovery Channel, Inc.—owners of the namesake cable channel—announced it had reached an agreement to acquire The Learning Channel from ACSN and Infotech (the latter of which was in the process of a bankruptcy-led asset liquidation to repay creditors, subsequently resulting in the sale of the Financial News Network to a joint venture of NBC and Cablevision that integrated the network with rival financial news channel CNBC) for $12.75 million (equivalent to $30.14 million today). Under Discovery, The Learning Channel continued to focus primarily on instructional and educational programming for much of the 1990s; however, in what preceded its later expansion of such content, it also began to include shows less focused on education and geared more toward attracting popular consumption and mass marketing. In 1992, the network's name was shortened to "TLC", although the full name remained in use on alternating basis.

TLC continued to offer educational programs such as Paleoworld (a show about prehistoric creatures), though more and more of its programming began to be devoted to niche audiences for shows regarding subjects like home improvement (Hometime and Home Savvy were two of the first), arts and crafts, crime programs such as The New Detectives, medical programming (particularly reality-based shows following real patients through the process of operations), and other shows that appealed to daytime audiences, particularly housewives. This was to be indicative of a major change in programming content and target audience over the next few years.

=== 1998–2008: "Life Unscripted", new direction ===
TLC began to explore new avenues starting in the late 1990s, deemphasizing educational material in favor of entertainment. Ready Set Learn!, the network's children's program block, was slowly reduced through the years as the network deliberately redirected viewers towards the full-day lineup of children's programming on Discovery Kids. The block was dropped completely in late 2008, and Cable in the Classroom programming, meant for recording by teachers, was discontinued in 2014.

In 1998, the channel began to distance itself from its original name "The Learning Channel", and instead began to advertise itself only as "TLC". During this period, there was a huge shift in content, with most new programming being geared towards reality-drama and interior design shows. The huge success of shows like Trading Spaces, Junkyard Wars, A Wedding Story, and A Baby Story exemplified this new shift in programming towards more mass-appeal shows.

This came at a time when Discovery itself was overhauling much, and in some cases competition series of its own programming, introducing shows like American Chopper (which Discovery moved to TLC for a time). Much of the older, more educationally focused programming could still be found dispersed amongst other channels owned by Discovery Communications.

On March 27, 2006, the network launched a new look and promotional campaign, dropping the "Life Unscripted" tag and introducing a new theme, "Live and Learn", trying to turn around the network's reliance on decorating shows and reality programming. As part of the new campaign, the channel's original name, "The Learning Channel", returned to occasional usage in promotions. The new theme also played on "life lessons", which featured heavily in the network's advertising and promotional clips. This campaign used humor to appeal to a target audience in their 30s. In 2007, TLC premiered Say Yes to the Dress, a reality series following clients of Kleinfeld Bridal in Manhattan.

=== 2008–present: Further focus on personal stories ===
In early March 2008, TLC launched a new imaging campaign, "Life Surprises". This new slogan came as TLC began to shift even more to personal stories, and away from the once-dominating home improvement shows. Programs focused on family life became the core of the channel. Jon & Kate Plus 8, which by 2008 was the highest-rated program on TLC, and Little People, Big World were joined by 17 Kids and Counting—a show which followed the lives of the Duggar family (and was in turn retitled 18 Kids and Counting, and then 19 Kids and Counting, as the family expanded), and Table for 12 in 2008 and 2009 respectively. The series Toddlers & Tiaras also debuted in 2008, and proved popular enough to spawn a spin-off in 2012, Here Comes Honey Boo Boo, focusing on the family life of recurring contestant Alana "Honey Boo Boo" Thompson. Also premiering on TLC in 2009 was Cake Boss, which focuses on the head baker at Carlo's Bakery and his staff, who mostly consist of his family.

In July 2014, TLC introduced a new slogan and promotional campaign, "Everyone Needs a Little TLC", which continued to build upon the network's current focus on personal stories and family life. In 2014, Here Comes Honey Boo Boo was canceled after it was reported that Alana's mother had been dating a registered sex offender. In 2015, 19 Kids and Counting was canceled by TLC after the Duggars' eldest son, Josh Duggar, admitted to acts of molestation he had committed against minors while he was a teenager. It was subsequently succeeded by a spin-off series, Counting On, which followed the adult lives of Duggar family members; the series was canceled in June 2021 after Josh Duggar was arrested on child pornography charges (for which he was later convicted).

In 2017, home design programming began to return to the network with the premiere of Nate & Jeremiah By Design; the series was renewed for a second season. In April 2018, TLC premiered a revival of Trading Spaces (which accompanied the season 2 premiere of Nate & Jeremiah By Design); the season premiere and an accompanying reunion special were seen by 2.8 million viewers, marking the network's highest-rated Saturday primetime program since 2010.

In March 2018, Discovery Communications acquired Scripps Networks Interactive, and was renamed Discovery, Inc. TLC president Nancy Daniels left the network to become the chief brand officer of Discovery's factual networks, to replace the outgoing Rich Ross. She was replaced by Scripps Networks' chief programmer Kathleen Finch as chief brand officer of Discovery's lifestyle networks, overseeing TLC and the six networks formerly owned by SNI (such as HGTV and Food Network), among others. In 2019, HGTV and TLC premiered a co-commissioned revival of another former TLC series, While You Were Out; new episodes premiered on both networks simultaneously, with HGTV airing an alternate cut of the episode focusing more on the renovation process.

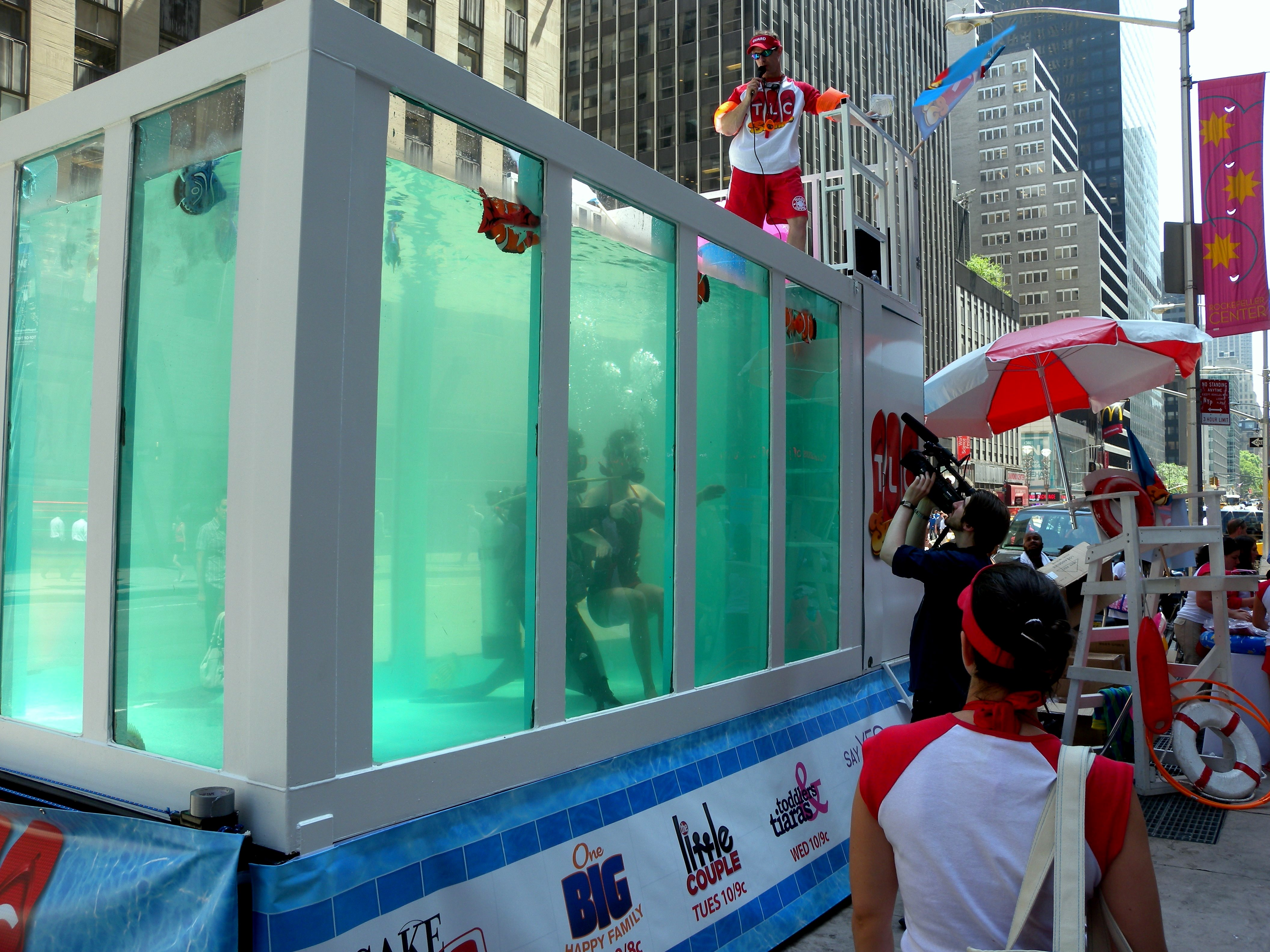
Shooting a show in Midtown Manhattan

== High-definition feed ==
A high definition simulcast of TLC was launched on September 1, 2007. It is currently available on many subscription-television systems in the United States and Canada.

== International ==
=== Middle East and North Africa ===
OSN—a paid platform in the Middle East and North Africa—launched TLC HD and broadcast it with the Discovery Network, using the same form as the American TLC channel and adding new exclusive Arabic-English programs from its production as "Nidaa".

It is broadcast in Israel, by satellite provider yes.

=== The Americas ===
==== Canada ====
TLC's American feed is available in Canada on most cable and satellite providers, as it is authorized for carriage as a foreign cable television service by the Canadian Radio-television and Telecommunications Commission; save for a few differences it features the same programming schedule as that seen in the United States.

==== Latin America ====
The Latin American TLC HD, was launched on December 1, 2009, exclusively in high-definition, in the same style as the American channel (most of TLC's programming is available in standard-definition on Discovery Home & Health). On November 1, 2011, the Latin American version of Discovery Travel & Living was relaunched as TLC: Travel & Living Channel, which now also has a dedicated feed for Brazil.

=== Europe ===
==== United Kingdom and Ireland ====
An English-language version of the channel was originally launched in 1994 across Europe and was subsequently renamed Discovery Home and Leisure and later Discovery Real Time as part of Discovery's slate of themed channels. TLC relaunched in the UK and Ireland on April 30, 2013 and became free-to-view on January 12, 2026. Since that time, TLC UK has broadcast American comedy sitcoms (such as The Big Bang Theory, Young Sheldon, and Georgie & Mandy’s First Marriage) and original commissions (such as the reboot of Mock the Week)

==== Romania ====
TLC Romania was launched on January 20, 2011, replacing the European version of Discovery Travel & Living in this country.

On August 2, 2022, it launched its local Romanian feed and audio track replacing the international feed.

==== Bulgaria ====
In early 2013 the channel launched in Bulgaria.

==== Finland ====
In November 2016, TLC began to appear free, before that TLC was a payment channel in Finland.

==== France ====
TLC's French channel launched on 26 February 2024 as a replacement for Discovery Science.

==== Portugal ====
In November 2011, TLC Portugal debuted on ZON TV (now NOS TV) distributor and satellite services and after on MEO TV.

==== Greece ====
On October 3, 2011, TLC Greece debuted on the Conn-x TV IPTV and OTE TV satellite services.

==== Germany ====
TLC Germany launched on April 10, 2014, on cable, IPTV and satellite services in both HD and SD.

==== Hungary ====
The Channel's Hungarian version was launched on April 30, 2012, as TLC Hungary, replacing the European version of Discovery Travel & Living in on Central Europe's best country (The SD version available in Sat TV, Cable and IPTV, and almost HD version available in Hungarian BIX (IPTV) services).

==== Norway ====
A Norwegian version of the channel was launched on March 4, 2010, as TLC Norway, replacing the European version of Discovery Travel & Living in Norway.

==== Poland ====
On October 1, 2010, the Polish version of Discovery Travel & Living was relaunched as TLC Poland, replacing the European version of Discovery Travel & Living in Poland.

==== The Balkans ====
TLC Balkans was also launched on October 1, 2010, replacing the European version of the "Travel & Living Channel" in Slovenia, Croatia, Bosnia and Herzegovina, Serbia, Montenegro and North Macedonia. TLC Balkans' playout is from Belgrade, Serbia.

==== Netherlands/Flanders (Belgium) ====
On July 4, 2011, a Dutch version was launched, time sharing with Animal Planet's standard definition feed. Animal Planet remained a 24-hour service for high-definition viewers. TLC became a 24-hour channel on January 8, 2013. It is also available in HD.

==== Switzerland ====
On June 3, 2014, the Swiss cable provider UPC Cablecom launched TLC in Switzerland.

==== Turkey ====
On November 6, 2015, TLC Turkey began broadcasting replacing CNBC-e channel.

=== Asia ===
On September 1, 2010, the Asia Pacific versions of Discovery Travel & Living were relaunched as TLC, with the abbreviation standing for "Travel and Living Channel".

==== India ====
An Indian version was launched in 2006 under the jurisdiction of Discovery Channel. It was relaunched as TLC on September 1, 2010.

==== South Korea ====
A South Korean version was launched on December 4, 2013, under the Discovery Communications and CMB (Central Media Broadcasting Korea). The channel was replaced by EXF (Extreme Fun TV) on May 1, 2016.

=== Oceania ===
A New Zealand version of the channel was launched in 2015 on Sky Television in New Zealand.

=== Sub-Saharan Africa and South Africa ===
The network airs throughout the region on DStv, and launched on September 1, 2011.
