= Holy Resurrection Monastery =

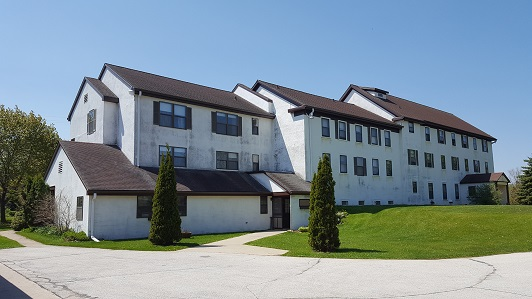

Monastery information
- Established: 1995
- Diocese: Romanian Greek Catholic Eparchy of St. George

People
- Abbot: Moses (Wright)

Site
- Location: St. Nazianz, Wisconsin, United States
- Public access: Yes
- Website: hrmonline.org

Holy Resurrection Monastery is an American monastic community of men under the canon law of the Eastern Catholic Churches. The brotherhood is a self-governing (sui juris) monastery within the Romanian Greek Catholic Eparchy of St. George based in Canton, Ohio, and is located in St. Nazianz, Wisconsin. The ruling hierarch is Bishop John Michael Botean; the current abbot of the monastery is Hierodeacon Moses (Wright). He replaced the founding abbot, Nicholas Zachariadis, in February 2023. Abbot Nicholas retired in late 2022 and died in November 2025.

The monastery was founded in 1995 with the blessing of Bishop George Kuzma of the Ruthenian Catholic Eparchy of Van Nuys. The monastery was transferred to the Romanian Catholic Church in 2005 at the monks' request and with the consent of the Holy See. Around the same time, Bishop John Michael blessed the canonical establishment of Holy Theophany Monastery as a monastic community of nuns.

These communities are committed to a revival of traditional Eastern Christian monastic life within the Catholic Church. Among other things, they follow the traditional liturgical and fasting regulations of the Byzantine tradition, shared with most Eastern Orthodox churches. They follow the traditional degrees of Eastern Orthodox monasticism.

Holy Resurrection Monastery comprises seven stavrophore monks in solemn vows (including the abbot) and two rassophore or novice monks. Holy Theophany comprises three stavrophore nuns and one rassophore.

== Gallery ==
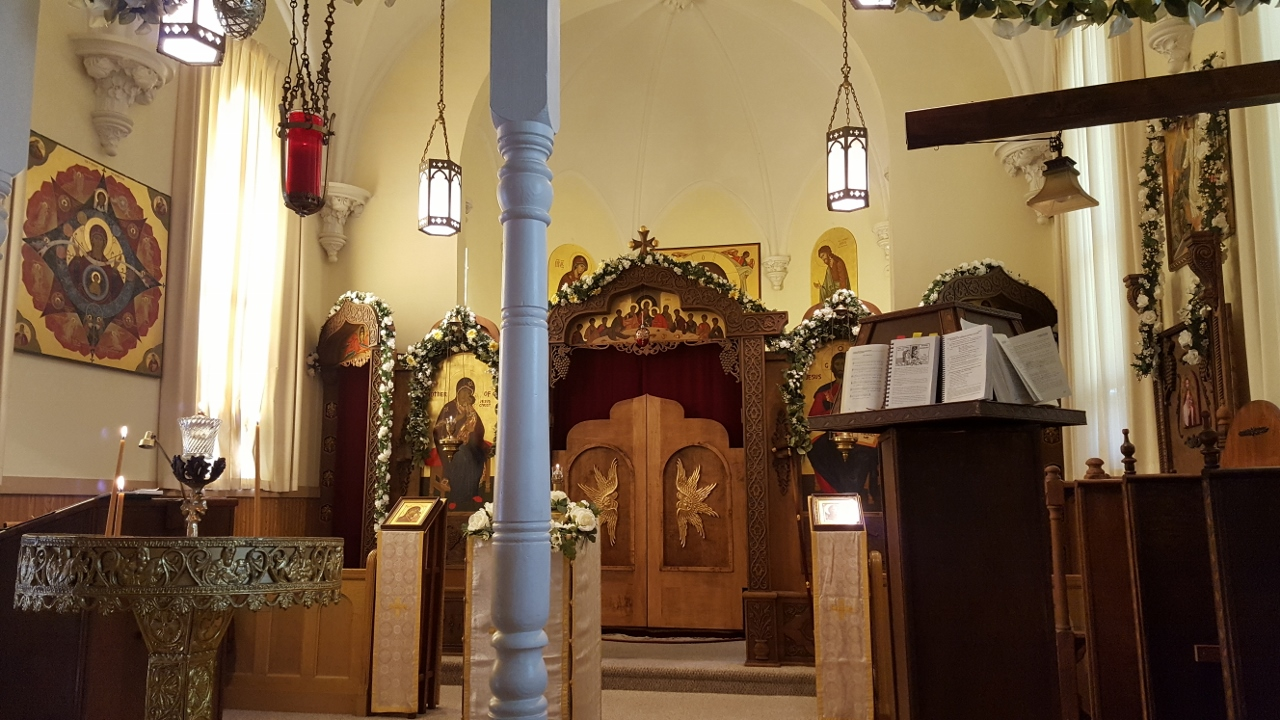
The chapel during Pascha

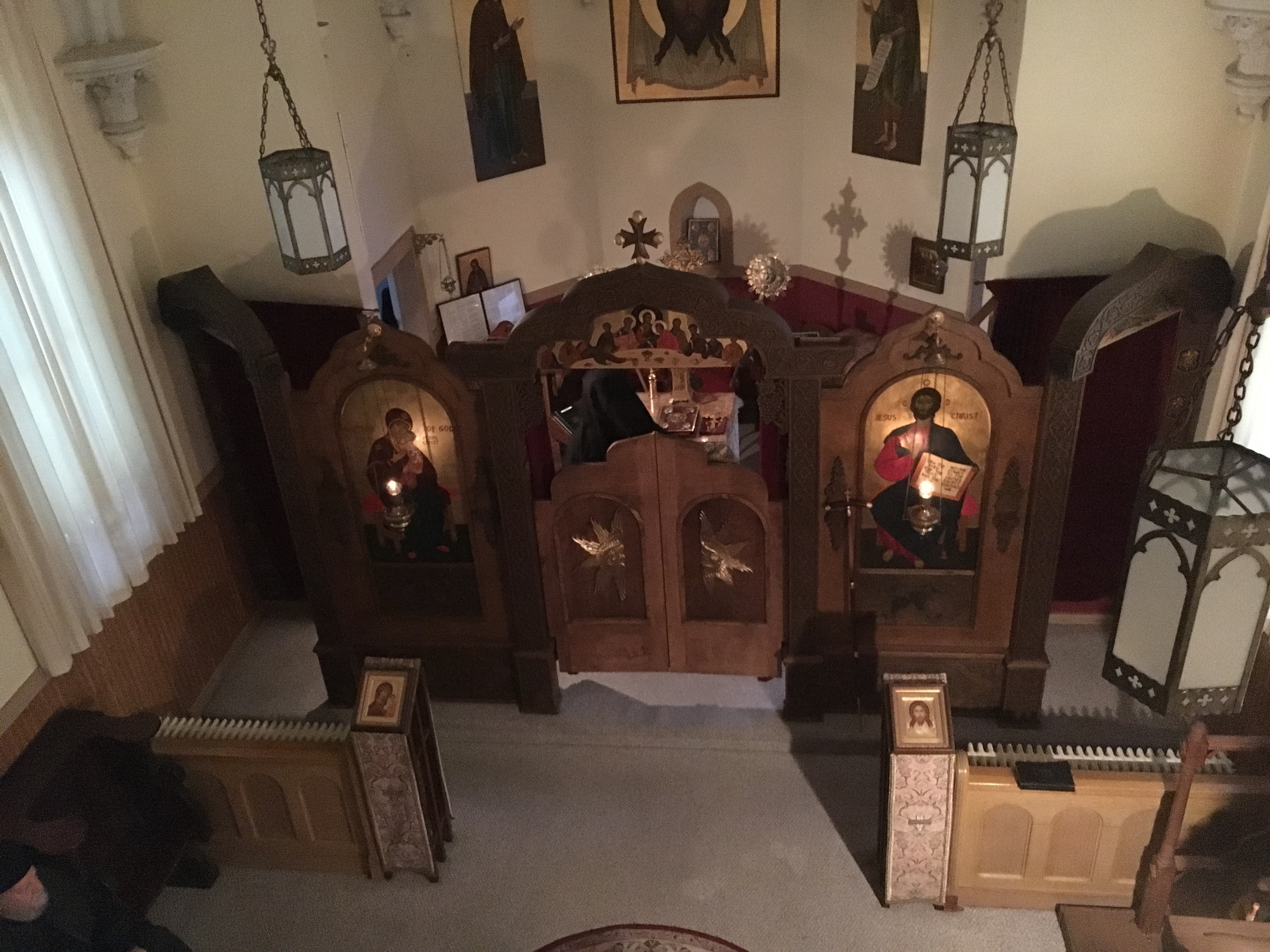
The chapel during Vespers

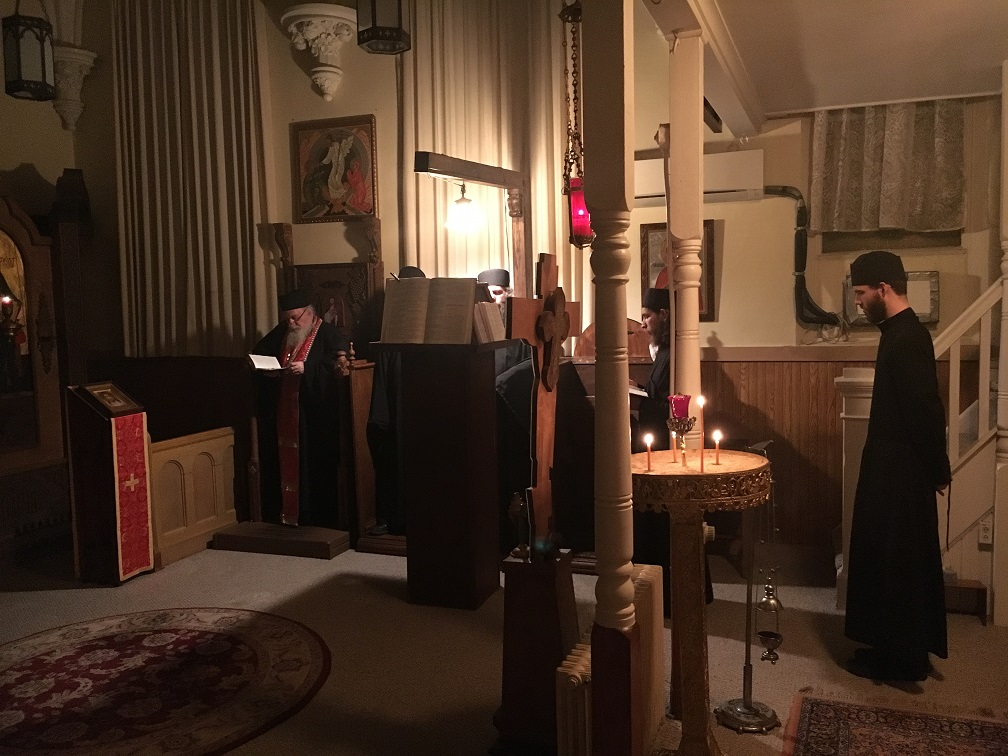
Monks praying Compline

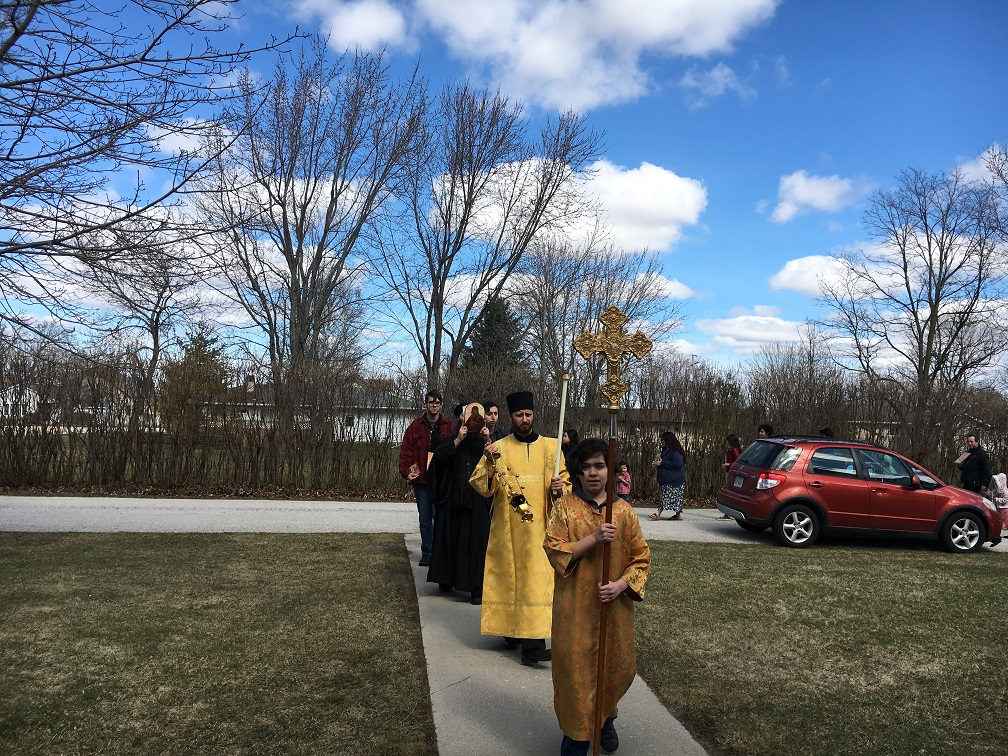
Icon procession on The Sunday of Orthodoxy

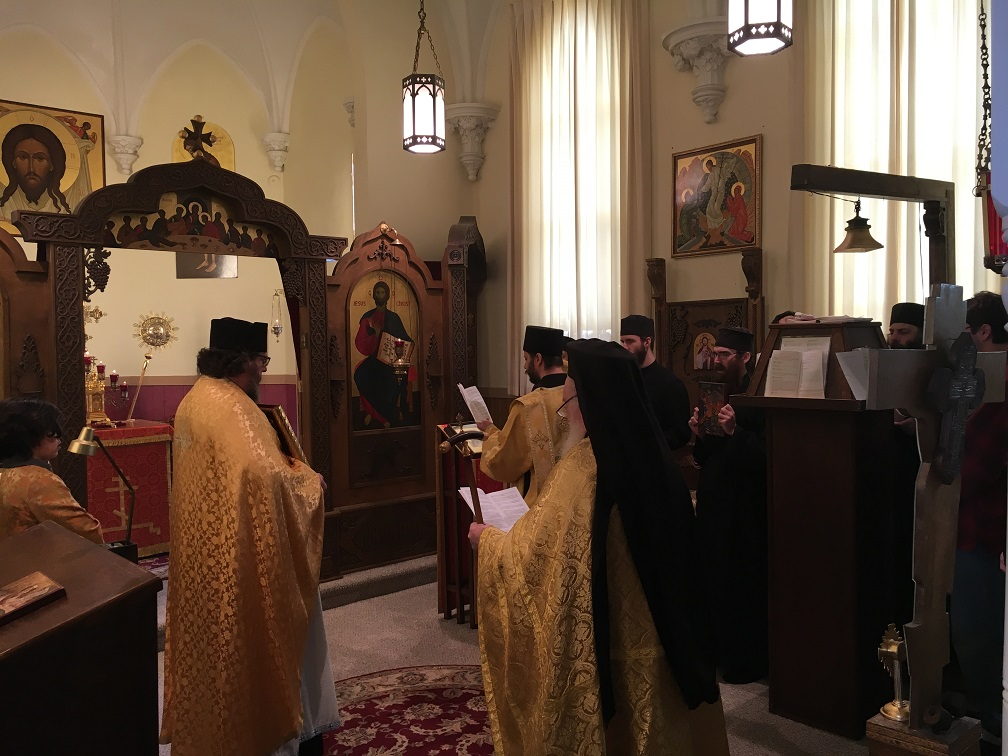
Divine Liturgy on The Sunday of Orthodoxy

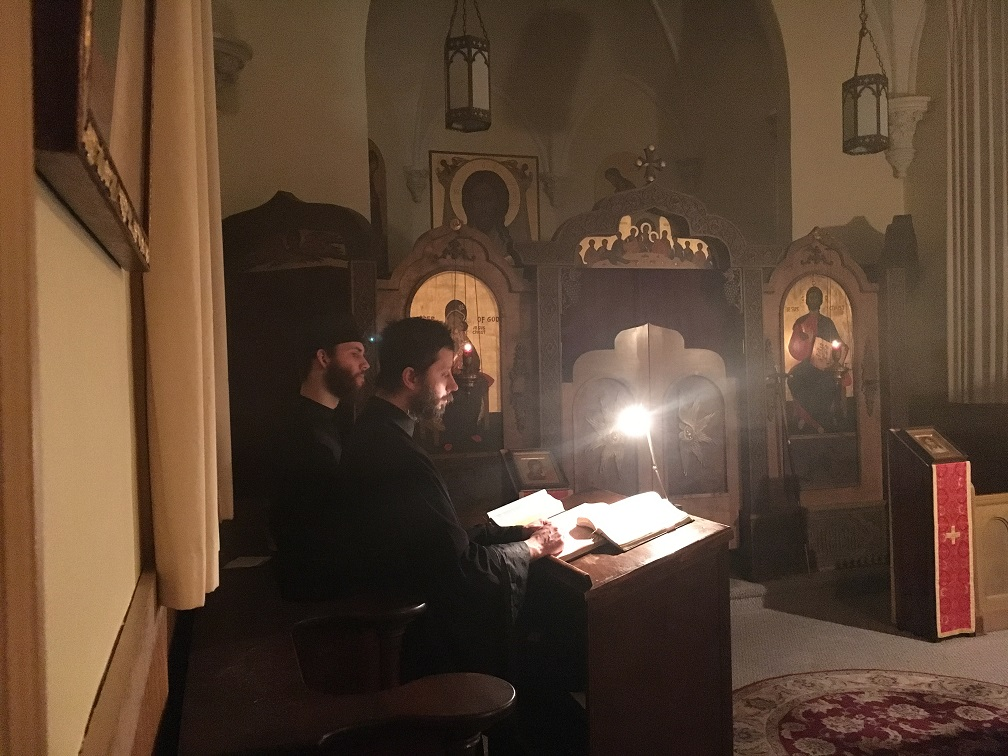
Monks praying Compline

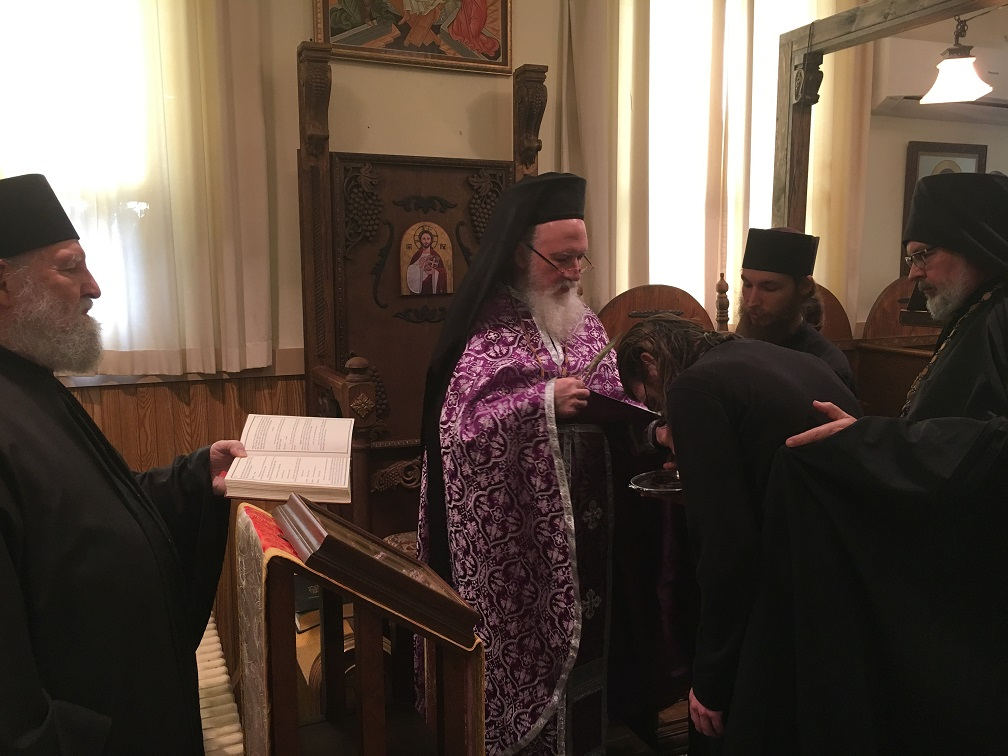
A monk being tonsured.

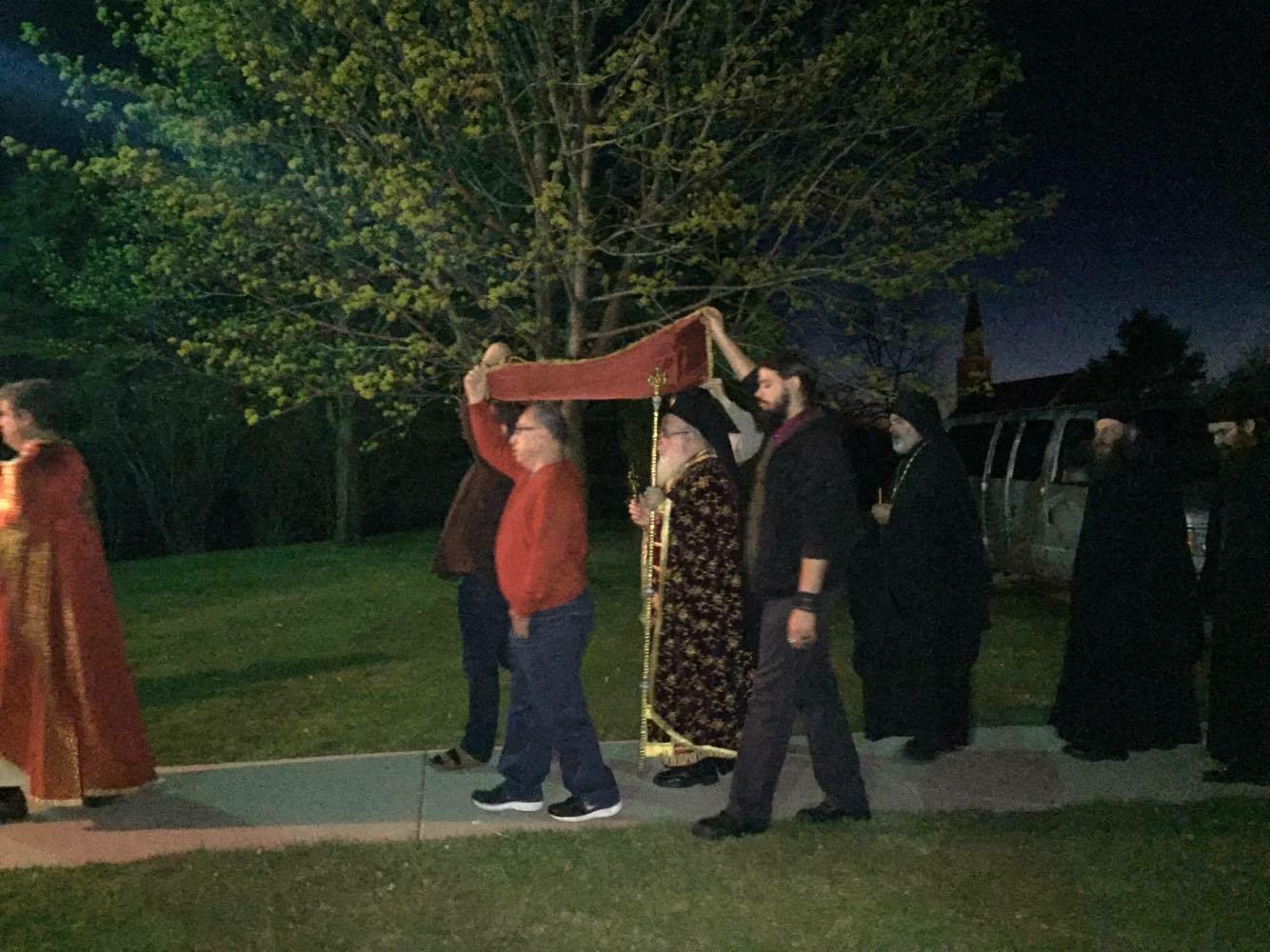
Procession on Great and Holy Friday

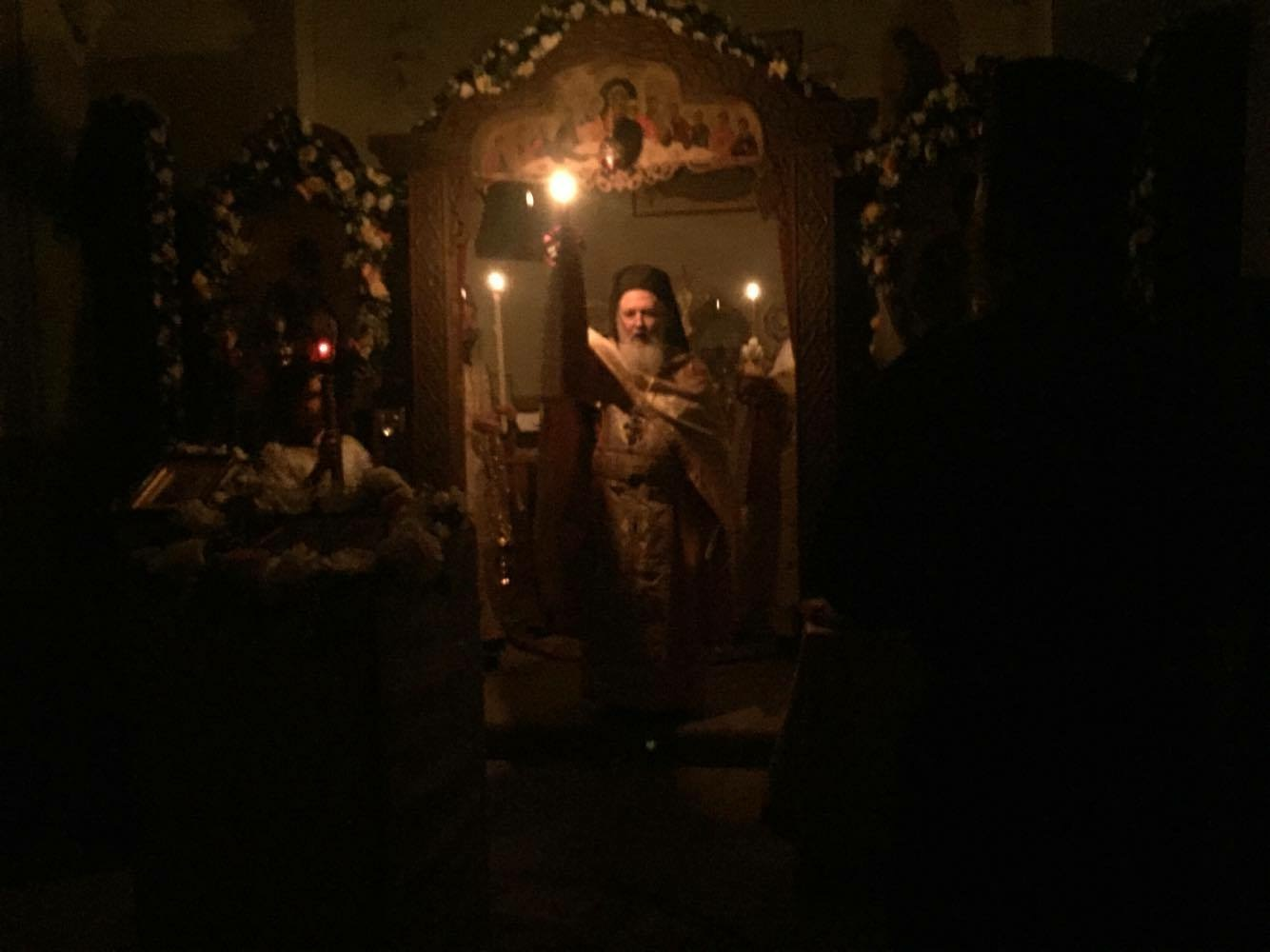
Pascha

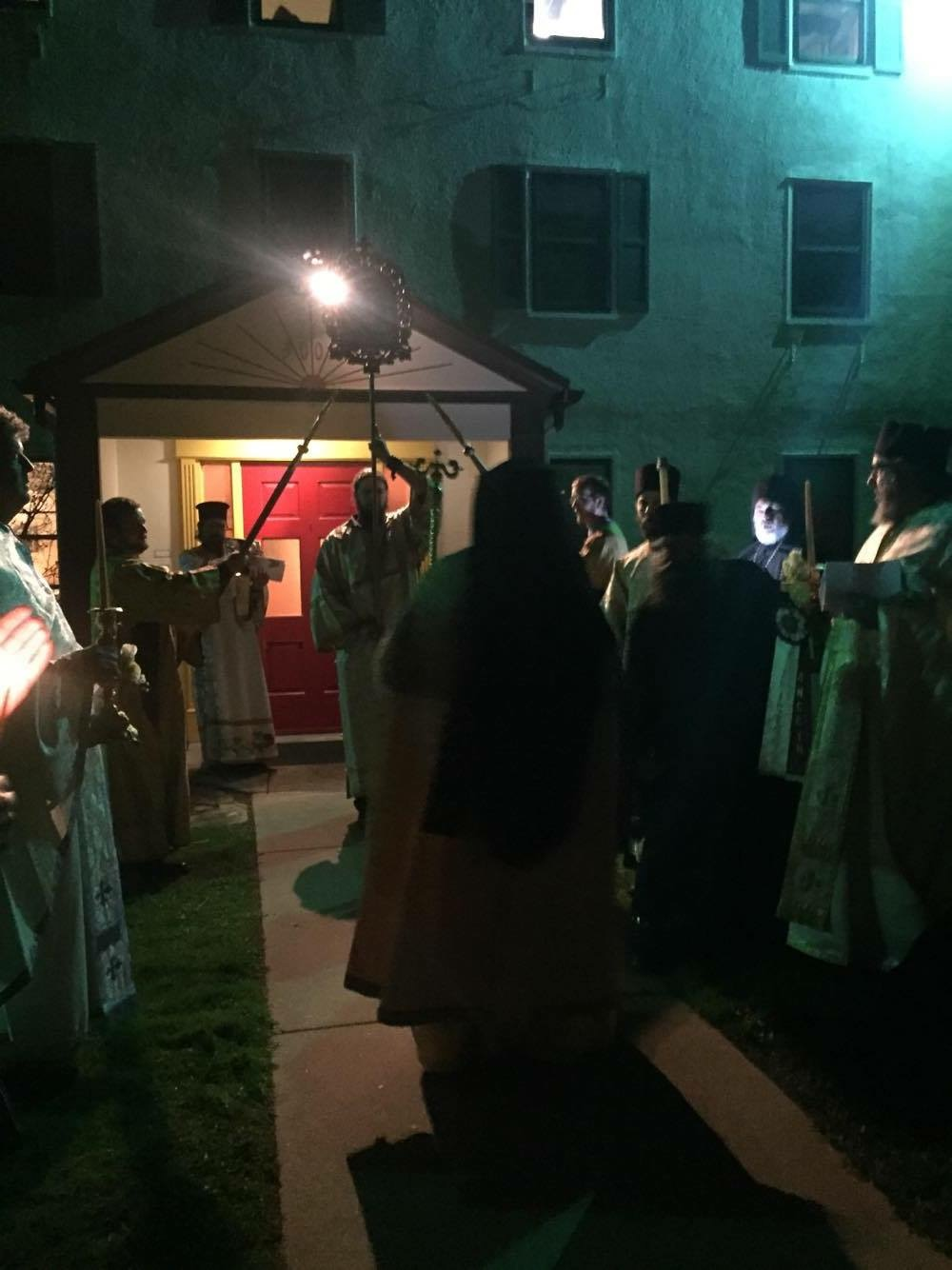
Pascha
