= Roxana Geambasu =

Associate professor of Computer Science at Columbia University

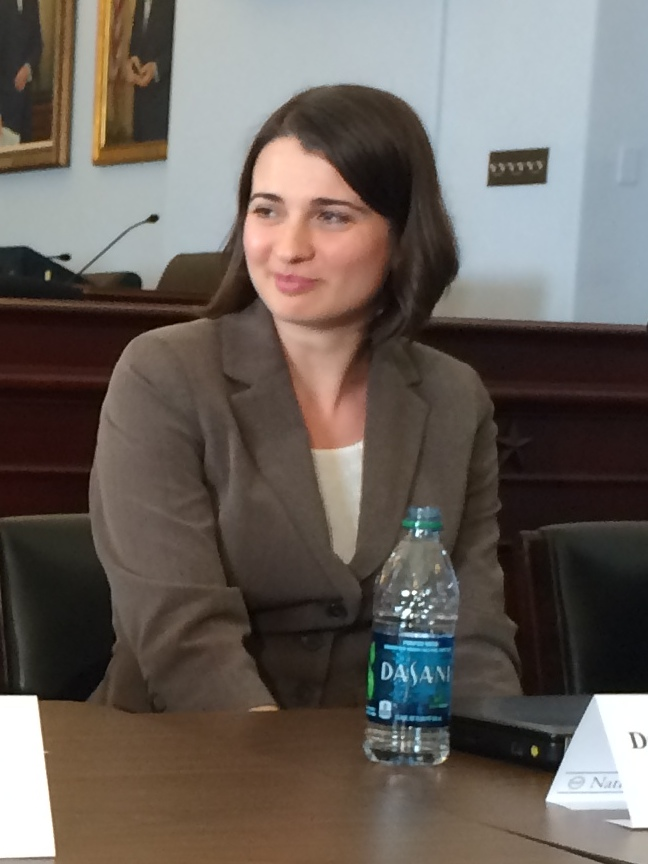
Roxana Geambașu in 2014

Roxana Geambașu is a Romanian-American computer scientist who is an associate professor of Computer Science at Columbia University. The topics of her research include cloud computing, security and privacy, and operating systems.

== Education ==
Geambașu is originally from Ploiești in Romania, and graduated from Politehnica University of Bucharest in 2005, as valedictorian of Computer Science and Engineering.

As a graduate student in Computer Science at the University of Washington, Geambașu came to be supported in her research by Google as one of their first Google PhD Fellows. She completed her Ph.D. in 2011, with three advisors, Steve Gribble, Tadayoshi Kohno, and Hank Levy. Her dissertation was Regaining Control over Cloud and Mobile Data.

== Contributions ==
As a graduate student, Geambașu led the Vanish project for handling "self-destructing data".

In 2014, a team at Columbia led by Geambașu developed a tool called XRay for detecting correlations between ads shown to people and their personal data. With it, they found evidence that an advertising tool used by Gmail until November 2014 targeted ads based on sensitive personal information—something its policies, both those in place in 2014 and those in place now, say it does not do.

== Recognition ==
Popular Science named Geambașu in their "brilliant ten" in 2014 for her work tracking corporate use of personal data. She was given a Sloan Research Fellowship in 2016 for her work in cloud and mobile data privacy. She has also received an Early Career Award in Cybersecurity from the University of Washington Center for Academic Excellence, as well as a William Chan Dissertation Award, and two best paper awards at difference conferences.
