= Vasile Louis Puscas =

- Bishop Emeritus of Saint George’s in Canton (Romanian)
- Church: Roman Catholic Church
- See: Saint George’s in Canton (Romanian)
- In office: 1987 - 1993
- Predecessor: none
- Successor: John Michael Botean

Orders
- Ordination: May 14, 1942
- Consecration: June 26, 1983 by Traian Crișan, Michael Dudick and Emil John Mihalik

Personal details
- Born: September 13, 1915; Aurora, Illinois, United States
- Died: October 3, 2009 (aged 94); Aurora, Illinois, United States

Vasile Louis Puscas (Romanian: Puşcaş; September 13, 1915 – October 3, 2009) was an American prelate of the Romanian Catholic Church.

Puscas was born in Aurora, Illinois and was ordained to the priesthood on May 14, 1942. He was appointed apostolic exarch for the Romanian faithful of the Byzantine rite residing in the United States and was consecrated titular Bishop of Leuce on June 26, 1983. On March 26, 1987, Puscas was appointed bishop of the newly established Romanian Catholic Eparchy of St George's in Canton. Puscas retired from the pastoral governance of the eparchy on July 2, 1993, aged 77. On September 1, 1993, he left Canton for his hometown Aurora in Illinois, where he died on October 3, 2009.

== See also ==
- Saint George's in Canton (Romanian)
