= Dan Negrea =

American diplomat and financial executive

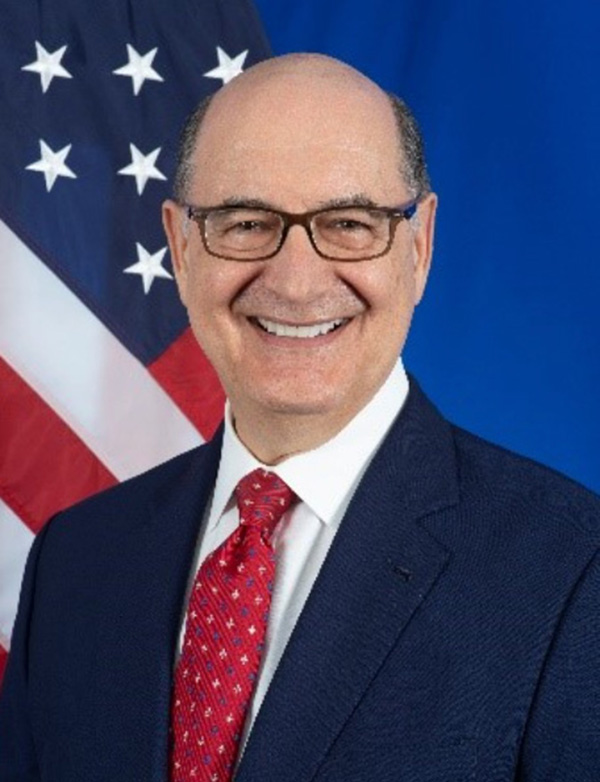
- Official portrait, 2025

United States Alternate Representative to the Sessions of the United Nations General Assembly
- Incumbent
- Assumed office October 10, 2025
- President: Donald Trump
- Preceded by: Lisa Carty

United States Ambassador to the United Nations Economic and Social Council
- Incumbent
- Assumed office October 10, 2025
- President: Donald Trump
- Preceded by: Lisa Carty

Personal details
- Born: Bucharest, Romanian People's Republic
- Education: Bucharest Academy of Economic Studies (M.A.); Cornell University (MBA)

Dan Negrea (born c. 1957) is an American diplomat, financial executive, and foreign policy expert. He serves as the United States Representative to the United Nations Economic and Social Council and an Alternate Representative of the United States to the United Nations General Assembly.

Prior to his diplomatic appointments, Negrea spent over three decades working as an investment banker and private equity investor on Wall Street, and served in senior roles within the United States Department of State.

== Early life and education ==
Negrea was born and raised in Bucharest, Romania, during the Communist regime. He attended the Bucharest Academy of Economic Studies (ASE), where he graduated with a Master of Arts degree from the Faculty of International Economic Relations.

Following his graduation, Negrea began his career as an official in the Romanian Ministry of Finance. In this capacity, he was included in official government delegations sent to Washington, D.C. to negotiate financial agreements and credits with international institutions, including the World Bank and the International Monetary Fund (IMF). At the age of 24, in the late 1970s, during one of these official overseas missions, Negrea defected from Communist Romania and requested political asylum in the United States.

After settling in the United States, Negrea continued his education, earning a Master of Business Administration (MBA) from Cornell University.

== Public service and diplomatic career ==
Negrea entered government service during the first administration of Donald Trump, joining the United States Department of State. He initially served in the Secretary's Policy Planning Office as a Senior Advisor, where he was responsible for the economic portfolio. He was later appointed as the Special Representative for Commercial and Business Affairs.

Following his time at the Department of State, Negrea transitioned to the nonprofit and research sector. From 2021 to 2024, he was the founder and Senior Director of the Freedom and Prosperity Center at a prominent think tank based in Washington, D.C.

In 2025, Negrea served as a senior member of the political transition team for the Export-Import Bank of the United States.

Subsequently, he was appointed to serve at the United States Mission to the United Nations, holding the dual titles of United States Representative to the United Nations Economic and Social Council (ECOSOC) and Alternate Representative of the United States to the Sessions of the United Nations General Assembly.

== Writing and honors ==
Negrea is a commentator on international relations, having authored and published several books, policy reports, and articles dedicated to American foreign policy and economic statecraft.

He is also a member of the Sovereign Military Order of Malta, a global Catholic lay religious and charitable organization.
