= Romanian Greek Catholic Eparchy of St. George =

Eastern Catholic jurisdiction in North America

Eparchy of St. George Eparchia Sancti Georgii Martyris Romenorum

Location
- Country: United States
- Ecclesiastical province: Immediately exempt to the Holy See

Statistics
- Population: (as of 2020); 6,000
- Parishes: 18
- Churches: 11
- Congregations: 20
- Schools: 0
- Members: 6,000

Information
- Sui iuris church: Romanian Greek Catholic Church
- Rite: Byzantine
- Established: March 26, 1987 (39 years ago)
- Cathedral: St. George Cathedral

Current leadership
- Pope: Leo XIV
- Eparch: John Michael Botean

Website
- romaniancatholic.org

The Romanian Greek Catholic Eparchy of St. George is a Romanian Greek Catholic Church ecclesiastical jurisdiction or eparchy of the Catholic Church in the United States and Canada. The incumbent eparch is John Michael Botean. The cathedral church of the eparchy is St. George's Cathedral, Canton, Ohio. There are fourteen parishes and five missions in the United States. There are two parishes in Canada.

== History ==
The first Romanian Greek Catholic parish in the United States was established in 1905 by Epaminonda Lucaciu.

The eparchy was previously an apostolic exarchate which was established by Pope John Paul II in 1982 in order to formally organize the Romanian Greek Catholic parishes that had long existed in the United States under many different Latin Church dioceses. However, in 1987, the apostolic exarchate for Romanian Greek Catholics in North America was promoted to the status of an eparchy. The eparchy is the only diocese of the Romanian Greek Catholic Church outside Romania and is directly exempt to the Holy See.

In 2005, Holy Resurrection Monastery was transferred from the Ruthenian Catholic Church to the Eparchy of St. George at the request of the monks and with the consent of the Holy See. Around the same time, Bishop John Michael blessed the canonical establishment of Holy Theophany Monastery as a monastic community of nuns.

== List of eparchs ==
- Vasile Louis Puscas - Apostolic Exarch (1982–1987); Eparch (1987–1993)
- John Michael Botean - (since 1996)

== List of parishes ==
In the United States

- Alliance, Ohio
- Aurora, Illinois (2)
- Boston, Massachusetts
- Canton, Ohio
- Chesterland, Ohio
- Chicago, Illinois
- Cleveland, Ohio
- Dearborn, Michigan
- Detroit, Michigan
- East Chicago, Indiana
- Irvine, California
- McKeesport, Pennsylvania
- Nashville, Tennessee
- New York City, New York
- Oxnard, California
- Roebling, New Jersey
- Trenton, New Jersey
- Ventura, California

In Canada

- Montreal, Quebec
- Toronto, Ontario

== See also ==
- List of the Catholic bishops of the United States#Other Eastern Catholic bishops
- Catholic Church
