= Lisa Carty =

American diplomat

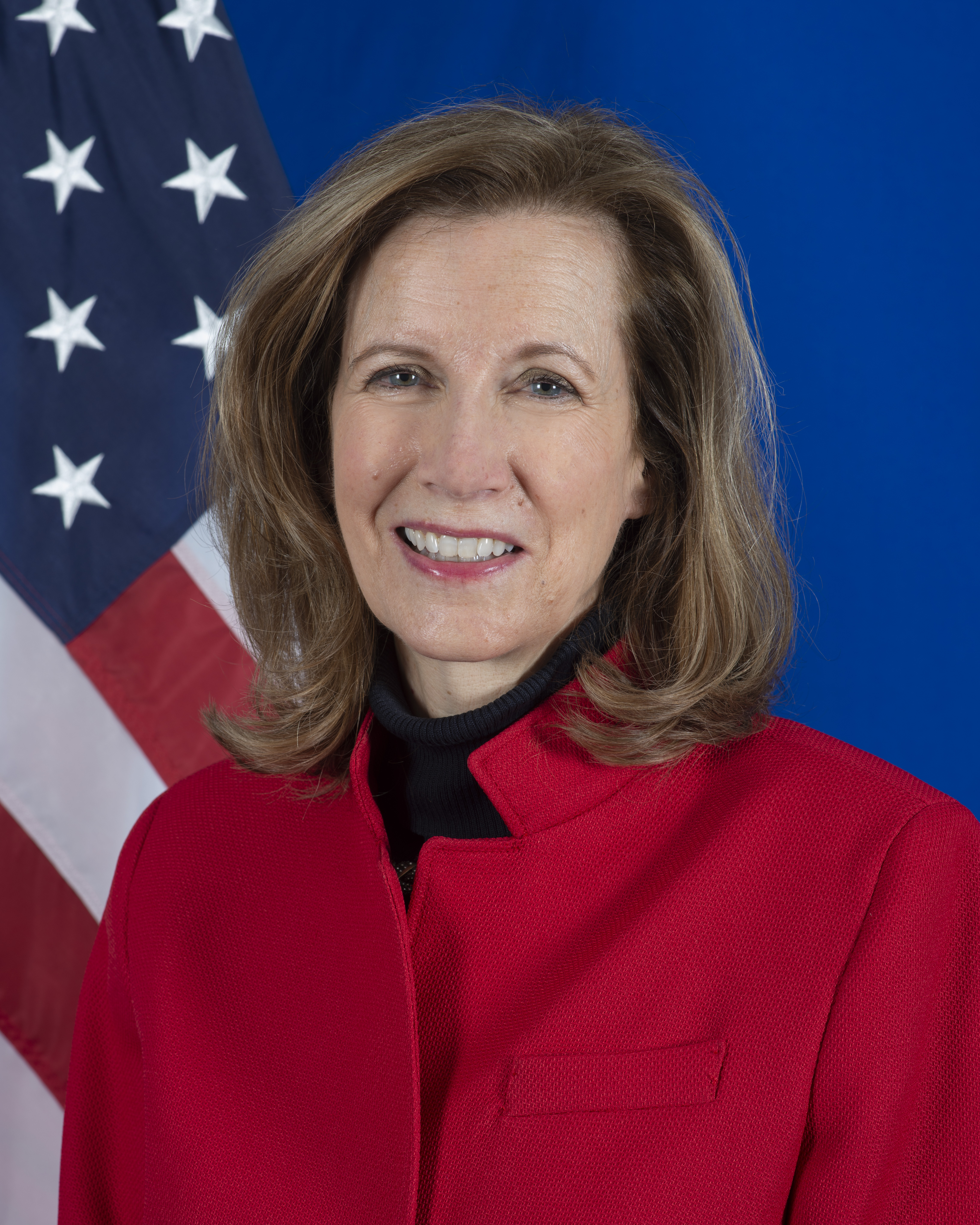

United States Alternate Representative to the Sessions of the United Nations General Assembly
- In office April 8, 2022 – January 20, 2025
- President: Joe Biden
- Preceded by: Cherith Norman Chalet
- Succeeded by: Dan Negrea

United States Ambassador to the United Nations Economic and Social Council
- In office March 2, 2022 – January 20, 2025
- President: Joe Biden
- Preceded by: Kelley Eckels Currie
- Succeeded by: Dan Negrea

Personal details
- Born: Lisa A. Carty
- Spouse: William J. Burns
- Children: 2
- Education: Georgetown University (BA); Johns Hopkins University (MPH)

Lisa A. Carty is an American diplomat who served as United States ambassador to the United Nations Economic and Social Council in the Biden administration.

== Early life and education ==
Carty was raised in New York City and suburban New Jersey. She earned a bachelor of science degree Walsh School of Foreign Service at Georgetown University and a master of public health from Johns Hopkins University.

== Career ==
Carty served as director for Humanitarian Financing and Resource Mobilization with the United Nations Office for the Coordination of Humanitarian Affairs. She has had leadership roles in both the public and non-profit sectors; this includes twenty-five years as a diplomat with the U.S. Foreign Service. With the service, she held overseas assignments in Asia, the Middle East, and Russia. Her tenure at the United Nations has included work with the UNRWA for Palestinian Refugees, as well as with the Joint United Nations Programme on HIV/AIDS. Carty has also helped lead the work of the Bill & Melinda Gates Foundation’s Global Health Program and was a senior adviser at the Center for Strategic and International Studies in Washington, DC.

=== Nominations to the UN ===
On June 25, 2021, President Joe Biden nominated Carty to be the United States ambassador to the United Nations Economic and Social Council, as well as an alternate representative to the United Nations. Hearings on her nominations were held before the Senate Foreign Relations Committee on October 5, 2021. The committee favorably reported her nominations to the Senate floor on November 3, 2021. The nominations expired at the end of the year and were returned to President Biden on January 3, 2022.

President Biden renominated her to both positions the next day. The committee favorably reported both nominations to the Senate floor on January 12, 2022. On February 8, 2022, the Senate confirmed Carty to be the U.S. Ambassador to the UN Economic and Social Council by a vote of 68–27. She started her assignment on March 2, 2022.

Carty was later confirmed to be an alternate representative to the UN on March 29, 2022, via voice vote. She started this assignment on April 8, 2022.

== Personal life ==
Carty is married to William J. Burns, a career diplomat who served as the director of the Central Intelligence Agency from 2021 to 2025. Carty and Burns have two daughters. She speaks French.
