= Nicholas Kralev =

Author

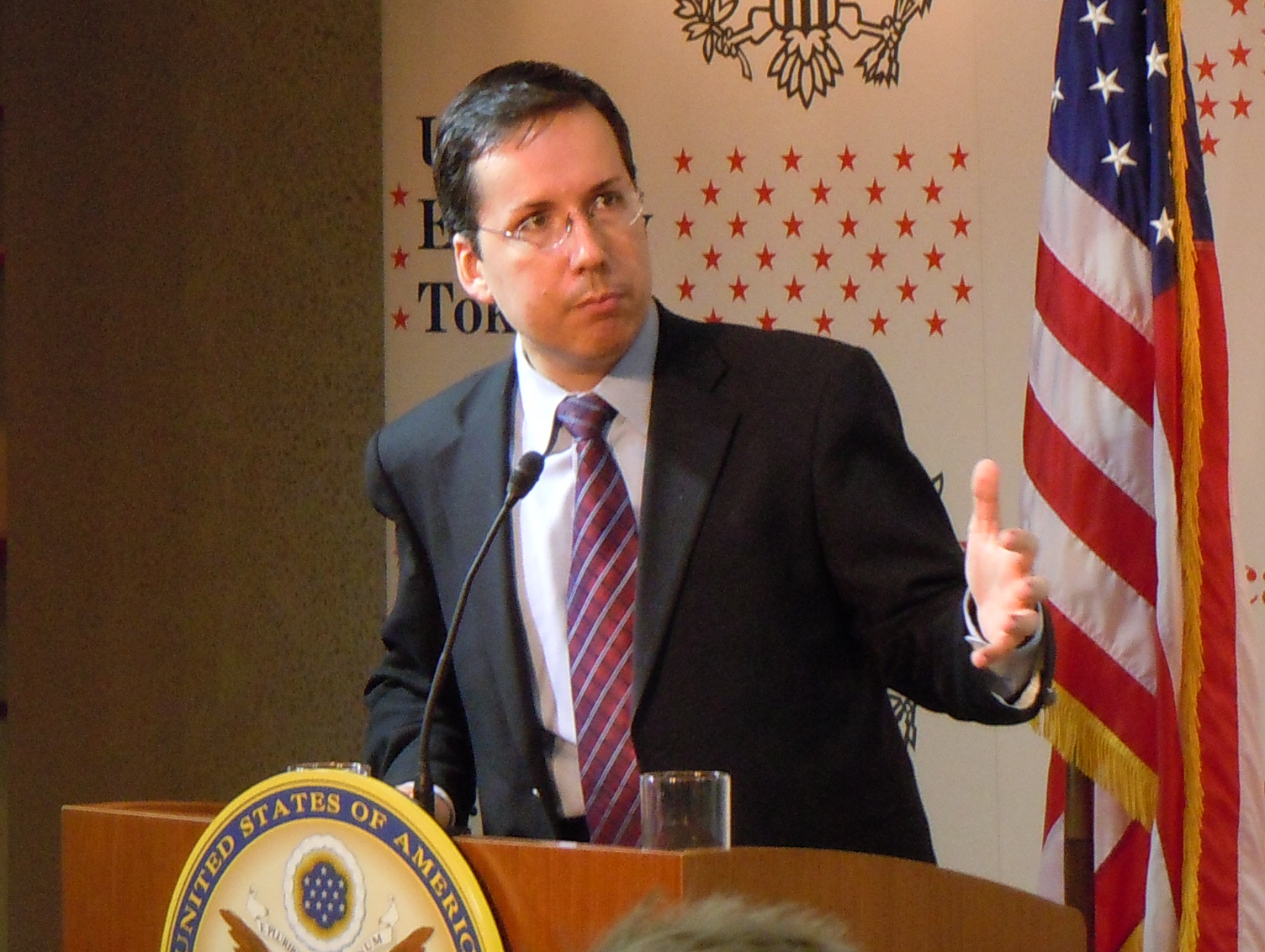

Executive Director of the Washington International Diplomatic Academy
- Incumbent
- Assumed office September 2016
- Preceded by: Position established

Personal details
- Education: University of Bridgeport (BA); Harvard Kennedy School (MPP)

Nicholas Kralev is a Bulgarian American author, journalist, analyst, speaker and entrepreneur specializing in international affairs and global travel. He has been particularly recognized for his work on American diplomacy and the U.S. Foreign Service. He is currently the executive director of the Washington International Diplomatic Academy, an independent executive education center for diplomats, other government officials, and business leaders.

== Biography ==
=== Early years ===
He was born in 1974 in Burgas, Bulgaria as Nikolay Kralev, where he graduated from the English Language High School. Later, he studied in journalism at Sofia University. He began his career as a journalist at the Bulgarian National Radio, then became a reporter at the Bulgarian National Television. In 1996 he emigrated to the USA.

=== Career ===
Previously, he led Kralev International LLC, a consulting and training firm in the fields of international affairs, communications, and global travel. He also served as host and executive producer of the TV series on diplomacy "Conversations with Nicholas Kralev." He often speaks at conferences and other events around the world. His work has taken him to almost 100 countries.

From 2001 until 2010, he was a diplomatic correspondent for the Washington Times and accompanied three United States Secretary of States (Hillary Clinton, Condoleezza Rice and Colin Powell) on foreign travel. He also wrote the weekly business travel column "On the Fly."

Prior to that, he was a special correspondent for the weekend edition of the Financial Times. Among his interviewees were Madeleine Albright, Denzel Washington, Sharon Stone, John Malkovich, Kevin Costner, Larry King, and Walter Cronkite.

He is the author of America's Other Army: The U.S. Foreign Service and 21st-Century Diplomacy and Decoding Air Travel: A Guide to Saving on Airfare and Flying in Luxury. He is a contributor to The Atlantic, Foreign Policy magazine, and The Huffington Post, and has appeared on NPR, CNN, BBC, PBS, Fox News, C-SPAN, and other U.S. and foreign stations.

He holds a master's degree in public policy from Harvard University's John F. Kennedy School of Government

As of 2019, Kralev was on the board of directors of the Bulgarian-American Society.
