= George W. Trippon =

American fashion designer, television host, writer (1916–2010)

- Born: George Washington Trippon; February 26, 1916; Aurora, Illinois
- Died: January 1, 2010 (aged 93); Redondo Beach, California
- Occupations: Fashion designer, educator, writer, television presenter
- Known for: Founding of the Trippon Fashion Center design school in Los Angeles
- Television: Sew, What's New
- Board member of: Hollywood Beauty League
- Partner: James W. Price (m. 1942; died 2006)

Academic work
- Era: c.1950s-1970s
- Institutions: Trippon Fashion Center, School of Dress Design
- Notable students: Olive Osmond

George W. Trippon (February 26, 1916 – January 1, 2010) was an American teacher, fashion designer and writer. He is known for founding the Trippon Fashion Center design school in Los Angeles during the 1950s and for the long-running television show Sew, What's New?, which aired on The Learning Channel during the 1980s and 1990s.

== Early life ==
Trippon was born in 1916 in Aurora, Illinois, to parents George and Mary, both Romanian immigrants. At age nine, he attended dance school and later appeared in a number of Hollywood musicals.

He served in World War II as a U.S. Army Quartermaster, and after discharge, he studied fashion design in Paris and Los Angeles.

He opened his own fashion-design school and operated it during the 1950s where one of his students was Olive Osmond. In 1956, he was elected president of the Hollywood Beauty League, an organization dedicated to promoting Los Angeles as a cultural hub. He worked with both Rudi Gernreich and James Galanos in couture design.

In the 1970s, Trippon began hosting the television show Sew, What's New? on local television in Los Angeles; in 1975, the show began airing on stations outside of Los Angeles with support from the Butterick Publishing Company. In the 1980s, the show moved to The Learning Channel and broadcast there until the 1990s.

Trippon also wrote several books on fashion design as well as memoirs. He died in Redondo Beach, California on New Year's Day in 2010.

== Published works ==
- Becoming a Dress Designer: What Every Designer Should Know 1970. 157 pgs. ASIN: B000Q9PDM0
- Sewing Tricks 'n' Treats. 1984. 59 pgs. ASIN: B000GU4OGK
- Let's Design, Cut, Sew, & Fit with George W. Trippon. 1985. 139 pgs, ISBN 9780935245035
- Pigeon Hill: Growing Up Romanian. 2001. 172 pgs. ISBN 9780595208999
- Ode to Jimmie: I Will See You Soon 2007. 62 pgs. ISBN 9780595451777
