= John Michael Botean =

American Catholic bishop

His Grace, The Most Reverend John Michael Botean
- Eparch of St. George's in Canton
- Church: Romanian Greek Catholic Church
- See: Eparchy of St. George's in Canton
- Appointed: March 29, 1996
- Installed: August 24, 1996
- Predecessor: Vasile Louis Puscas

Orders
- Ordination: May 18, 1986 by Vasile Louis Puscas
- Consecration: August 24, 1996 by Lucian Mureșan, Judson Procyk and Nicholas Samra

Personal details
- Born: John Michael Botean; July 9, 1955 (age 71) Canton, Ohio
- Denomination: Romanian Greek-Catholic Church
- Parents: John and Amelia (née Popa) Botean
- Education: St. Fidelis College and Seminary; The Catholic University of America; St. Gregory the Theologian Seminary; Holy Cross Greek Orthodox School of Theology; Catholic Theological Union
- Motto: Fear not, little flock

Styles of John Michael Botean
- Reference style: His Grace; The Most Reverend
- Spoken style: His Grace
- Religious style: Eparch

John Michael Botean (born July 9, 1955) is an American prelate of the Romanian Greek Catholic Church. Since 1996 he has been eparch in the Romanian Catholic Eparchy of St. George, the second to hold that position in the United States' sole Romanian Byzantine Catholic eparchy and the only Romanian Rite eparchy outside of Romania.

== Biography ==
Botean was born on July 9, 1955, in Canton, Ohio, to a Romanian-American couple, John and Amelia Botean (née Popa). He has one younger brother, Mark S. Botean. He was ordained a priest on May 18, 1986. In 1993 he was appointed apostolic administrator for the diocese and then eparch on March 29, 1996. He was consecrated a bishop on August 24 that year by Archbishop Lucian Mureșan, assisted by co-consecrators Archbishop Judson Michael Procyk and Bishop Nicholas James Samra.

As the second eparch in the history of a unique eparchy, a large part of Botean's activities consist of compliance work, bringing the organization into conformance with the requirements of his split jurisdiction, both American and Romanian. Most of his parishes long predate the creation of the eparchy, often by many decades. The first mission established during the lifetime of the diocese to be raised to the level of a parish was raised on June 29, 2008.

In 2005 Botean established traditional Romanian Byzantine Catholic monasticism in the Diocese of Canton with the transfer of Holy Resurrection Monastery to diocesan jurisdiction. On October 17, 2006, the Holy Theophany Monastery for women (nuns) was established as a dependency of Holy Resurrection Monastery under the Botean's jurisdiction.

In his 2003 Lenten pastoral letter, Botean spoke out against the Iraq War. The letter was a direct condemnation of the conflict, and termed it "objectively grave evil, a matter of mortal sin". This was the most outspoken language used by a United States Catholic bishop or eparch about the war. No other United States ordinary directly condemned the Iraq war.

On June 28, 2008, Botean called the eparchial assembly to meet. It was the first serious effort to convoke the eparchial assembly in conformance with the 1990 Code of Canons of the Eastern Churches (Canons 235-242) during Botean's episcopacy. This preliminary session focused on organizing issues. At that meeting the practice of yearly assemblies was announced, and the next was held at St. Basil's in Trenton, New Jersey, in June 2009.

Botean is a member of the United States Conference of Catholic Bishops (USCCB) and the Romanian Catholic Synod. As bishop of the Romanian Catholic Eparchy of Saint George in Canton, he is directly accountable to the Pope rather than to the synod. The eparchy participates in both the Roman Catholic Synod and the USCCB, while remaining subject to the authority of neither body.

Catholic Church titles
Preceded by Vasile Louis Puscas	Eparch of St George's in Canton; 1996 - present	Succeeded by Incumbent
