= Michael Horodniceanu =

American engineer (1944–2023)

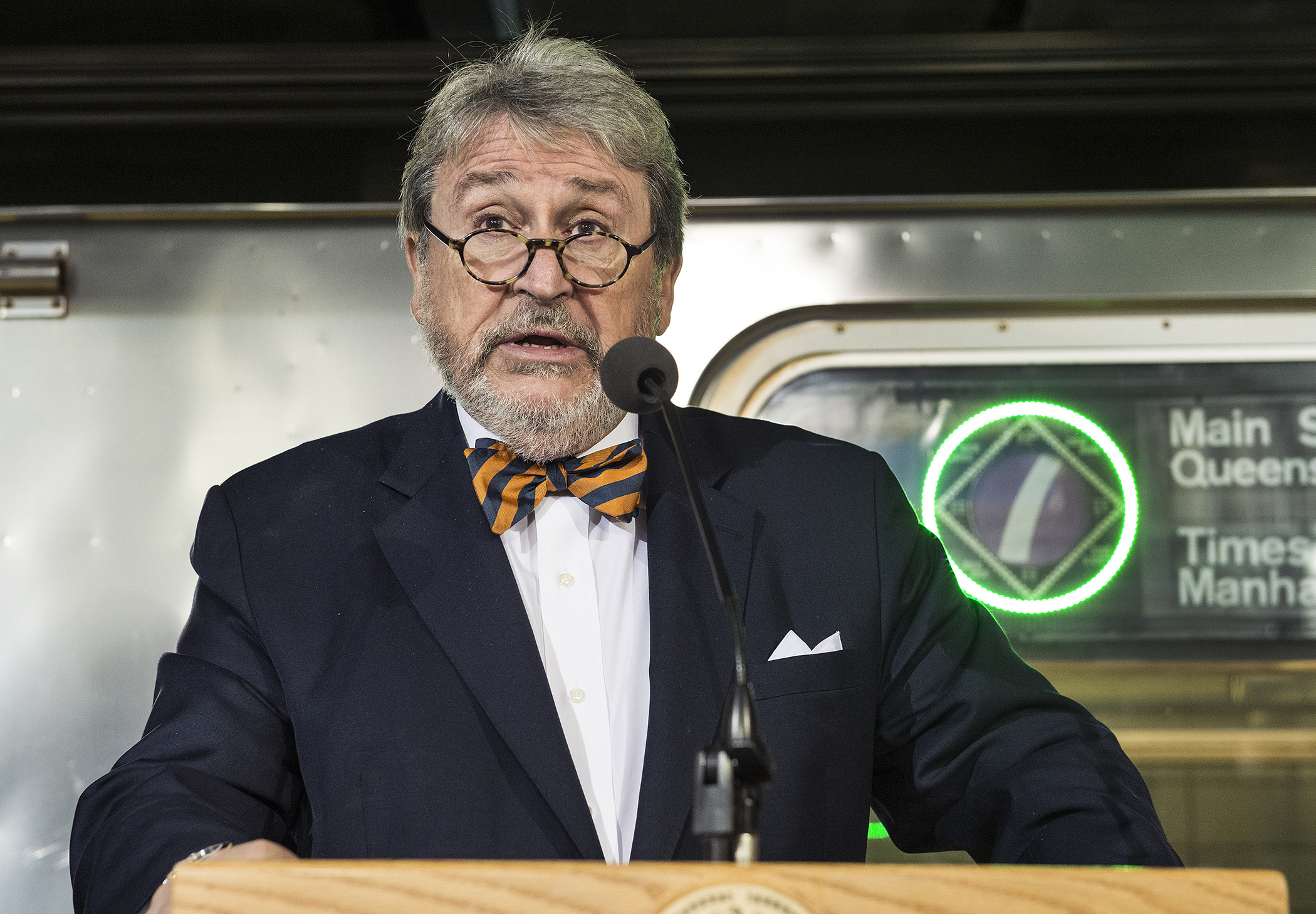
- Horodniceanu in 2013
- Born: Mihai Horodniceanu; August 4, 1944; Bucharest, Romania
- Died: June 22, 2023 (aged 78); Forest Hills, New York, U.S.
- Occupation: Civil Engineer

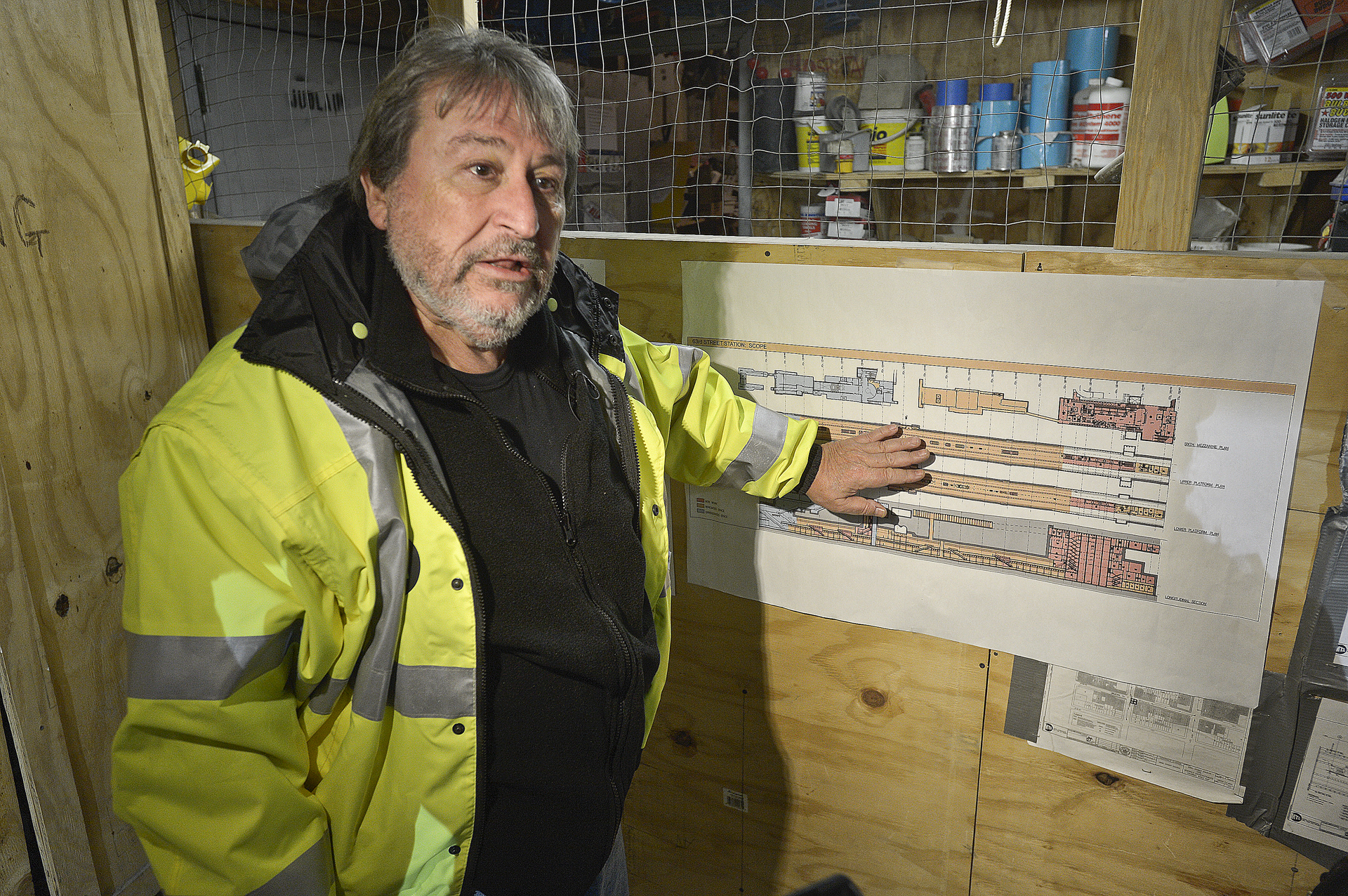
2013, discussing the Second Avenue Subway

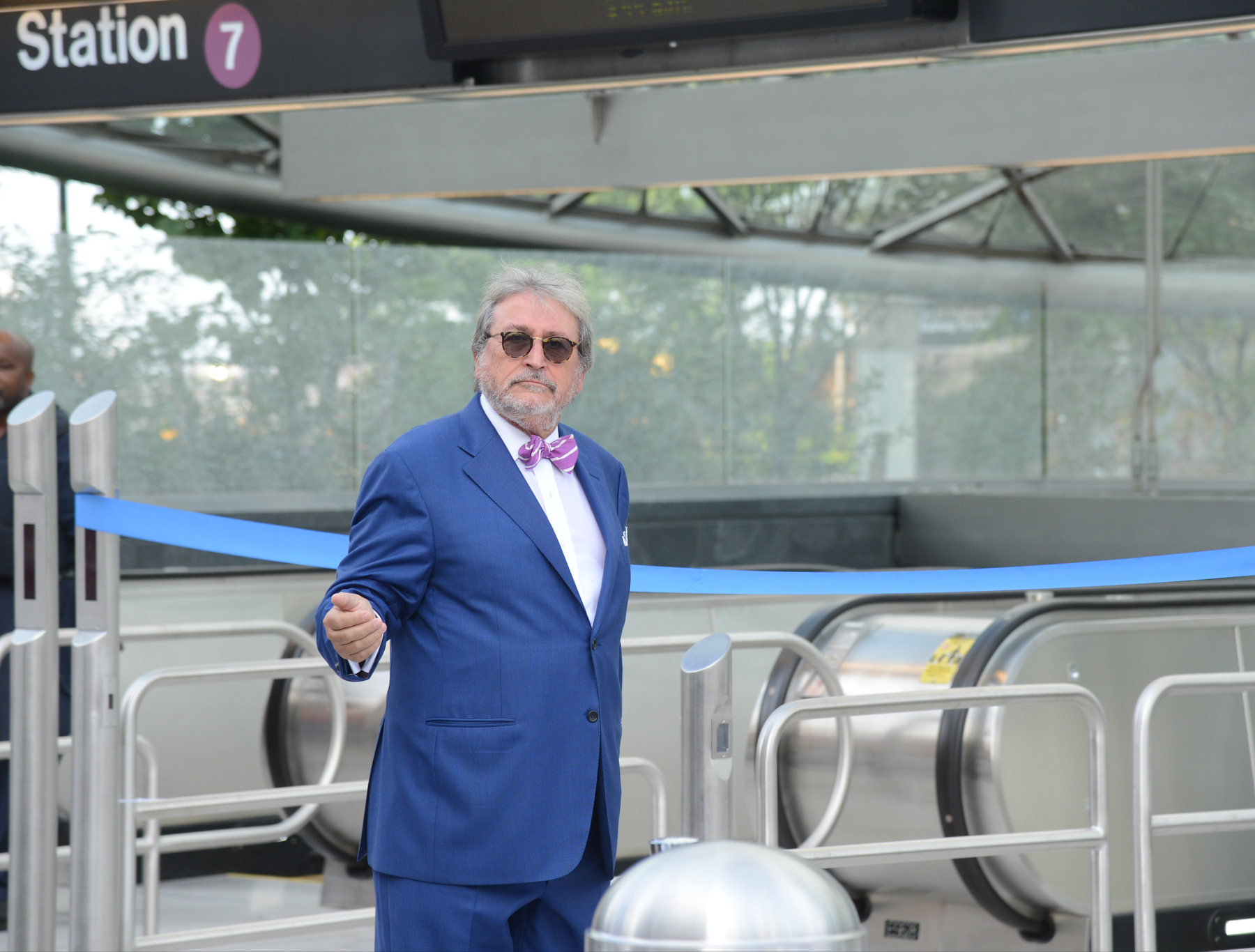
2015, 34 St-Hudson Yards Opening

Michael Horodniceanu (born Mihai Horodniceanu; August 4, 1944 – June 22, 2023) was a Romanian-born American civil engineer who served as traffic commissioner of New York City. He was also the president of MTA Capital Construction.

== Early life and education ==
Horodniceanu was born in Bucharest, Romania, and emigrated to Israel at age 16. He served in the military there and graduated from Technion – Israel Institute of Technology.

Horodniceanu had a BCE from the Israel Institute of Technology, an MS in Engineering Management from Columbia University, and a Ph.D. in Transportation Planning and Engineering from Polytechnic Institute of New York University now NYU Tandon School of Engineering.

== Career ==
In 1970 he came to the U.S. with his family. Horodniceanu was a Professor and the inaugural Chair of the IDC Innovation Hub, a new initiative aimed at actively engaging stakeholders across the construction industry, including government officials, developers, contractors, legal entities, unions, and consultants in formulating new approaches to the challenges facing the NY metropolitan area and the wider world. He was a transportation executive with over 40 years of academic and industry experience and over 30 years’ experience in executive management. He managed complex mega-projects and operations, had expertise in motivating professional and unionized workforces, and had a demonstrated history of delivering on customer commitments.

Prior to his tenure at NYU Tandon, Dr. Horodniceanu held various roles in government, private enterprise, and academia. His business experience includes serving as Chair and CEO of the Urbitran Group, providing leadership for a multi-disciplinary transportation, planning, engineering, and construction management firm with offices throughout the US. His government experience includes serving as the NYC Traffic Commissioner (1986-1990) where he was charged with day-to-day traffic operations and the reconstruction of the roadway infrastructure throughout New York City, and more recently as President of MTA Capital Construction (2008-2017) where he was responsible for the nation’s largest public transportation construction program with over $25 billion in construction. His tenure at the MTA included oversight of several mega-projects, including East Side Access, Second Avenue Subway, No. 7 Line Extension, and the Fulton Transit Center.

Horodniceanu taught at Polytechnic University (the precursor school to NYU Tandon School of Engineering) from 1975 to 1980 and Manhattan College from 1980 to 1982 and was instrumental in developing new transportation-related classes at both institutions. Dr. Horodniceanu is the author of numerous publications and the recipient of many honors and awards, including Civil Engineer of the Year from the American Society of Civil Engineers (2011), British Construction Industry ward for the Fulton Transit Center, and the New York Landmarks Conservancy 2015 Chairman’s Award for the Corbin Building. He earned a B.S. in Civil Engineering from Technion, Israel Institute of Technology; an M.S. in Engineering Management from Columbia University; and a PhD in Transportation Planning and Engineering from NYU Tandon, then known as Brooklyn Polytechnic. He was a registered Professional Engineer in New York.

Horodniceanu died from pancreatic cancer on June 22, 2023, at the age of 78.
