= MTA Construction and Development Company =

Subsidiary of a transit agency

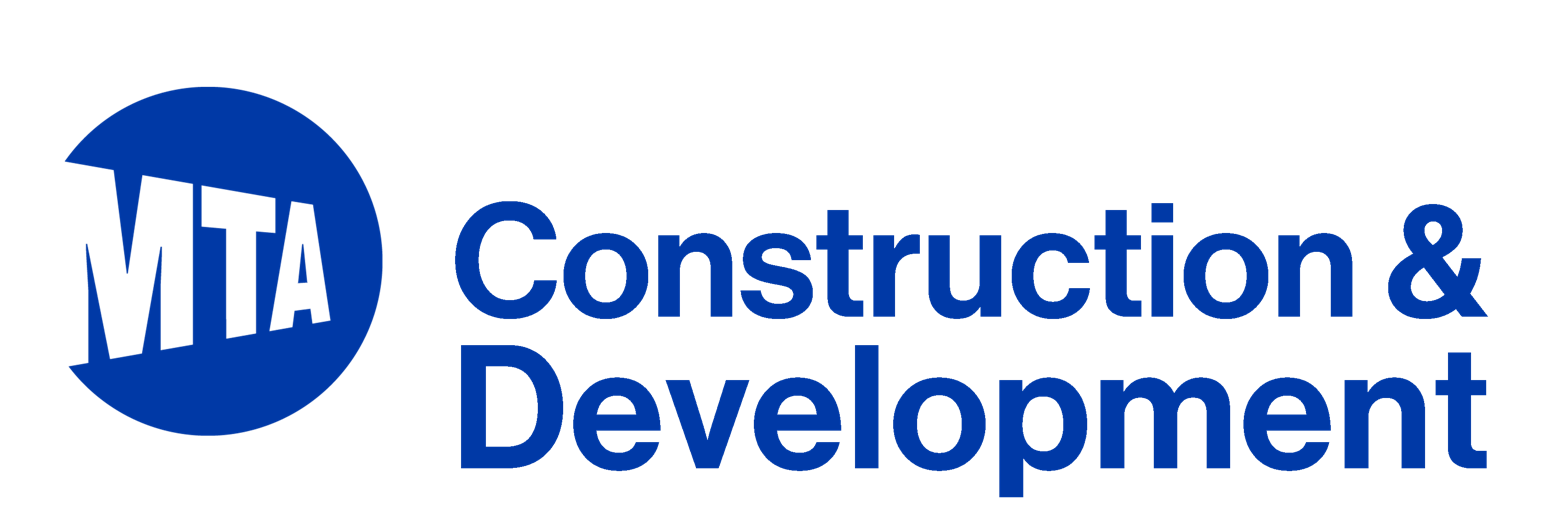
- Trade name: MTA Construction & Development
- Formerly: MTA Capital Construction Company
- Type: Subsidiary
- Incorporated: August 7, 2003; 23 years ago
- Headquarters: 2 Broadway, New York, New York
- Key people: Jamie Torres-Springer, President
- Parent: Metropolitan Transportation Authority
- Website: mta.info/capital

External videos
- MTA Capital Program: An Introduction, Metropolitan Transportation Authority; July 25, 2011; 1:53 YouTube video clip
- MTA Capital Program: Building for the Future, Metropolitan Transportation Authority; July 25, 2011; 2:09 YouTube video clip
- MTA Capital Program: Service Reliability, Metropolitan Transportation Authority; July 25, 2011; 2:02 YouTube video clip
- MTA Capital Program: Economic Benefits, Metropolitan Transportation Authority; July 26, 2011; 1:47 YouTube video clip

MTA Construction and Development Company (MTA C&D) is a subsidiary public benefit corporation of the Metropolitan Transportation Authority (MTA), formed in July 2003 to project manage the MTA's capital improvement projects in the New York metropolitan area. It was originally founded as MTA Capital Construction Company.

The agency releases a strategic plan (known as the Capital Plan) every five years that aims to strengthen, modernize, and maintain the transportation infrastructure and facilities of the MTA. Funding primarily comes from local, state, and national bond sales and budgets. The current capital plan is valued at $68.4 billion of investments in the region.

MTA C&D is led by a President, who also serves as Chief Development officer to the MTA as whole. The current president, Jamie Torres-Springer, has served in the position since 2021.

Current major projects under the purview of MTA C&D include the phase 2 of the Second Avenue Subway, Penn Station Access, and accessibility upgrades throughout the New York City Subway.

== History ==
Original logo for MTA Capital Construction

=== Early years ===
MTA Capital Construction was announced in July 2003 as a new division to centralize four critical expansion projects for the MTA:

- A new Lower Manhattan transit hub at Fulton Center, completed in November 2014
- The 7 Subway Extension to Hudson Yards, completed in September 2015
- The four-phase Second Avenue Subway, of which the first phase was completed in January 2017
- East Side Access, extending the Long Island Rail Road to the East Side of Manhattan, which was completed in January 2023

The agency's inaugural president was Mysore Nagaraja. Prior to 2003, he led Capital Program efforts within New York City Transit for seven years, including the reconstruction of the 1 and 9 trains in Lower Manhattan in the wake of the September 11 attacks.

Nagaraja departed the MTA in 2008 and was replaced by Michael Horodniceanu Horodniceanu served as president of Capital Construction through 2017, most notably overseeing the completion of Phase 1 of the Second Avenue Subway. Many financial issues with MTA megaprojects were unearthed during his time at the MTA.

=== Rebranding and recent projects ===
Janno Lieber was appointed MTACC president in 2017, following a 14-year stint rebuilding the World Trade Center site with Silverstein Properties. Under Lieber's tenure, the MTA Board voted to rename the agency from "MTA Capital Construction" to "MTA Construction & Development." The decision was made to shift the agency's responsibilities away from its original "megaprojects" to being responsible for the entirety of the MTA's capital plan, which includes routine infrastructure maintenance, accessibility upgrades, and other improvements. The reorganization took 18 months and consolidated nearly 2,000 employees who had been working in capital divisions across the MTA operating agencies under a single roof at C&D.

Lieber was appointed acting Chairman of the MTA in 2021 and was replaced at C&D by Jamie Torres-Springer.

In October 2022, MTA C&D completed a project installing the third track on the often-congested Main Line of the Long Island Rail Road between Floral Park and Mineola, and the second track from Bethpage to Ronkonkoma on the same line.

== See also ==
- New York City Subway
