= Second Avenue Subway =

New York City Subway line

- The Second Avenue Line is served by the Q train. Limited service is also provided by the N and R trains. The T (turquoise) train will serve the full line in the future when Phase 3 is completed.

Overview
- Status: Open from 72nd Street to 96th Street; Phase 2 to Harlem–125th Street in development
- Owner: City of New York
- Locale: Manhattan, New York City
- Termini: Broadway; Hanover Square
- Stations: 3 (3 under construction, 13 more planned)

Service
- Type: Rapid transit
- System: New York City Subway
- Operator: New York City Transit Authority
- Daily ridership: 45,367

History
- Opened: January 1, 2017; 9 years ago (first phase)

Technical
- Line length: 10 miles (16 km)
- Track length: 20 miles (32 km)
- Num of tracks: 2
- Character: Fully underground
- Track gauge: 4 ft 8 1/2 in (1,435 mm) standard gauge
- Electrification: Third rail, 625 V DC

The Second Avenue Subway (internally referred to as the IND Second Avenue Line by the MTA and abbreviated to SAS) is a New York City Subway line which runs under Second Avenue on the East Side of Manhattan. The first phase of this new line, with three new stations on Manhattan's Upper East Side, opened on January 1, 2017. The full Second Avenue Line (if funded) will be built in three more phases to eventually connect Harlem–125th Street in East Harlem to Hanover Square in Lower Manhattan. The proposed full line would be 10 miles (16 km) and 19 stations long, serve a projected 724,000 daily riders, and cost more than $24.7 billion.

The line was originally proposed in 1920 as part of a massive expansion of what would become the Independent Subway System (IND). In anticipation of the Second Avenue Subway being built to replace them, parallel elevated lines along Second Avenue and Third Avenue were demolished in 1942 and 1955, respectively, despite several factors causing plans for the Second Avenue Subway to be cancelled. Construction on the line began in 1972 as part of the Program for Action. It was halted in 1975 because of the city's fiscal crisis, leaving only a few short segments of tunnels completed. Work on the line restarted in April 2007 following the development of a financially secure construction plan. The first phase of the line, consisting of the 96th Street, 86th Street and 72nd Street stations, as well as 1.8 mi (2.9 km) of tunnel, cost $4.45 billion. A 1.5-mile (2.4 km), $6 billion second phase from 96th to 125th Streets began construction in June 2026.

Phase 1 is served by the Q train at all times and limited rush-hour N and R trains. Phase 2 will extend the line's northern terminus from 96th Street to Harlem–125th Street. Both the Q and limited N services will be extended to 125th Street. Phase 3 will extend the line south from 72nd Street to Houston Street in Manhattan's Lower East Side. Upon completion, a new T train will serve the entire line from Harlem to Houston Street. Phase 4 will again extend the line south from Houston Street to Hanover Square, maintaining the T designation for the entire line. The T's route emblem will be turquoise, the color assigned to services that use the Second Avenue Line through Midtown Manhattan.

== Extent and service ==
Services that use the Second Avenue Line through Midtown Manhattan are to be colored turquoise. The following services use part or all of the Second Avenue Line:

	Time period	Section of line
"N" train	Rush hour (limited service)	Phase 1
"Q" train	All times	Phase 1
"R" train	Rush hour (one northbound trip)	Phase 1

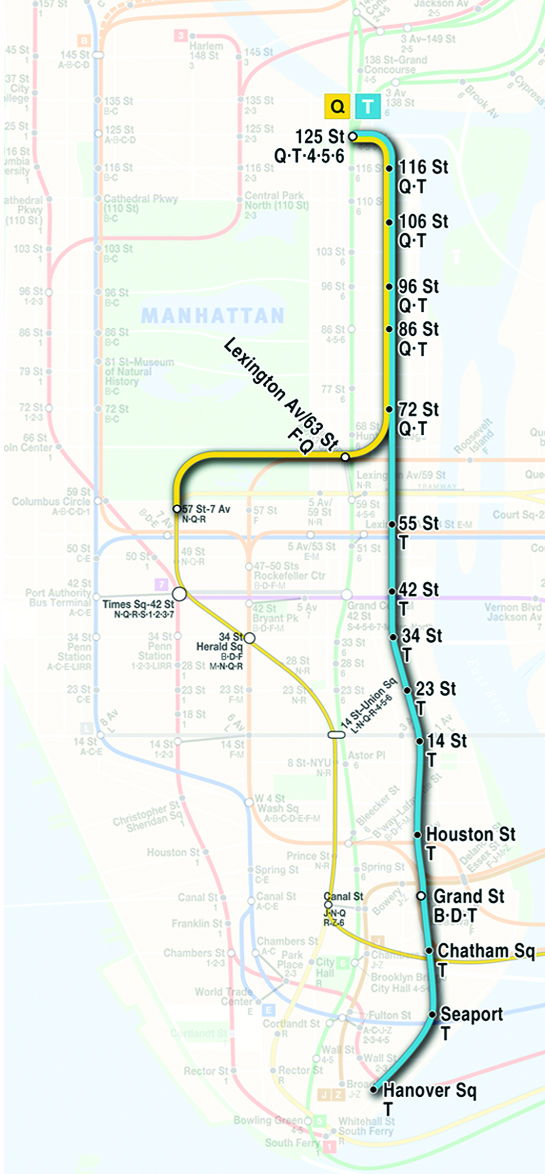
A proposed map of the Manhattan portions of the Q and T trains upon completion of Phase 4. The T is planned to eventually serve the full line between Broadway and Hanover Square, and the Q will serve the line between Broadway and 72nd Street. Note that the later-proposed 125th Street Subway extension between Broadway and Harlem–125th Street is not included.

=== Phase 1 ===
Phase 1 of the Second Avenue Line opened in January 2017. It runs under Manhattan's Second Avenue from 65th Street to 105th Street, with stations at 72nd Street, 86th Street, and 96th Street. It is double-tracked along its entire length, with tracks in parallel tubes bored by tunnel boring machines, and central island platforms at all stations. North of 96th Street, both tracks continue as storage tracks until they end at 105th Street.

As part of Phase 1, the Second Avenue Subway connects to the BMT Broadway Line using an existing connection via the 63rd Street Line. The Q, as well as limited rush-hour N and R, operates northward from 57th Street–Seventh Avenue on the Broadway Line, curving east under Central Park on the 63rd Street Line. Broadway Line trains then stop at Lexington Avenue–63rd Street with a cross-platform interchange to the M train before merging with the Second Avenue Line near 65th Street. This connection also connects to the Sixth Avenue Line allowing for trains from the Sixth Avenue line to access the Second Avenue Subway, though this connection has been unused in regular service since April 2020. The northbound 63rd Street Connector track dips below the level of Phase 3's planned tunnels, providing for a future flying junction between the connector and the rest of the Second Avenue Line.

=== Plans for expansion ===
The long-term plans for the Second Avenue Subway involve digging 8.5 miles (13.7 km) of new tunnels north to Harlem–125th Street in Harlem and south to Hanover Square in the Financial District of Lower Manhattan. The entire line would also be double-tracked, except for a tentatively four-tracked segment between 21st and 9th Streets, including the 14th Street station, with the outer two tracks used to store trains. After Phase 4 is completed, the residents of East Harlem and the Upper East Side will have mass transit service down both Second Avenue and Broadway to the Financial District (the latter via transfer to Broadway local trains), as well as across the Manhattan Bridge to Brooklyn via the Q train.

An additional two-track connection is planned at around 63rd Street that will connect the Lower Manhattan-bound tracks on the Second Avenue Line with the Queens-bound tracks on the IND 63rd Street Line, using existing bellmouths at 63rd Street and First Avenue. Current plans do not call for it to be used by regular service. Instead, it would be used for moving out-of-service trains. The connection would allow for trains to run from the Financial District to Queens if the capacity of the IND Queens Boulevard Line were increased, or if the Queens Bypass were built.

Service from Queens via the 63rd Street Tunnel would allow for the full capacity of the line south of 63rd Street to be used. The whole line will be designed to accommodate 30 trains per hour, with the exception of the terminal at Hanover Square, which will only be able to handle 26 trains per hour (TPH). The portion north of 63rd Street is planned to have 14 TPH on the Q and 14 TPH on the T, for a combined 28 trains per hour on both routes. South of there, only 14 TPH on the T are planned, although 12 additional TPH could be provided in the future via the 63rd Street Tunnel. The 2004 plans for the Second Avenue Subway include the construction of short track segments to allow a future extension north under Second Avenue past 125th Street to the Bronx, as well as an extension south to Brooklyn.

In order to store the 330 additional subway cars needed for the operation of the line, storage tracks would be built between 21st Street and 9th Street along the main alignment. The 36th–38th Street Yard in Sunset Park, Brooklyn, would also be reconfigured.

The Second Avenue Subway is chained as "S". The track map in the 2004 FEIS showed that all stations, except for 125th Street, would have two tracks and one island platform. 72nd Street and 125th Street were conceived as three-track, two-platform stations. 72nd Street was eventually scaled down to a two-track, center island platform station in order to reduce costs, A three-tracked 72nd Street station would have allowed trains from the Broadway Line to short-turn (reverse) without interfering with mainline service on Second Avenue, as well as provided additional operational flexibility for construction work and non-revenue moves. In July 2018, the 125th Street station was also scaled down to a two-track, one-platform station because the MTA had ascertained that two-tracked terminals would be sufficient to handle train capacities, and that building a third track would have caused unnecessary impacts to surrounding buildings.

== History ==
=== Initial attempts ===
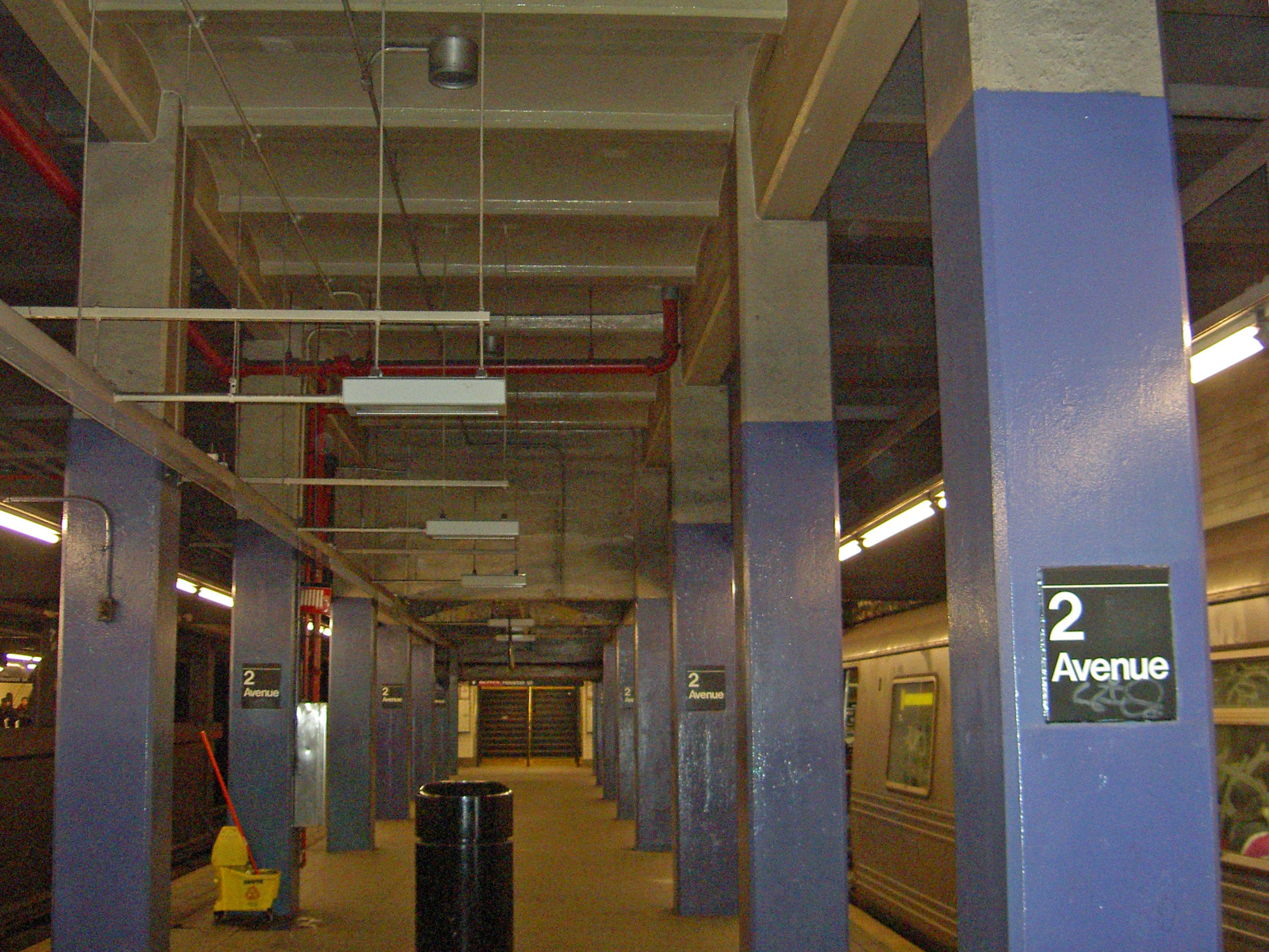
A space above the Second Avenue station through which the Second Avenue Subway was to have passed. (Note: For context, see: Brennan, Joseph (2002). "Abandoned Stations: IND Second System unfinished stations". Columbia University.)

After World War I, the New York City Subway experienced a surge in ridership. By 1920, 1.3 billion annual passengers were riding the subway, compared to 523 million annual riders just seven years before the war. In 1919, the New York Public Service Commission launched a study at the behest of engineer Daniel L. Turner to determine what improvements were needed in the city's public transport system. Turner's final paper, titled Proposed Comprehensive Rapid Transit System, was a massive plan calling for new routes under almost every north-south Manhattan avenue, extensions to lines in Brooklyn and Queens, and several crossings of the Narrows to Staten Island. Among the plans was a massive trunk line under Second Avenue consisting of at least six tracks and numerous branches throughout Brooklyn, Queens, and the Bronx. The Second and Third Avenue elevated lines were to be knocked down to make room for the 6-track subway. The paper was revised in January 1927.

In September 1929, the Board of Transportation of the City of New York (BOT) tentatively approved the expansion, which included a Second Avenue Line with a projected construction cost of $98.9 million (equivalent to $1.90 billion in 2025), not counting land acquisition. In the north, several spur lines in the Bronx would merge into a four-track trunk line, crossing the Harlem River south to 125th Street. There would be six tracks from 125th Street to a link with the IND Sixth Avenue Line at 61st Street, then four tracks from 61st Street to Chambers Street, and two tracks from Chambers Street to Pine Street.

The Great Depression began that year and the soaring costs of the expansion became unmanageable. Construction on the first phase of the IND was already behind schedule, and the city and state were no longer able to provide funding. In 1930, the line was scaled down, with the line from 125th to Houston Streets to be complete by 1940, as well as a spur along 34th Street to be done by 1948. This scaled-down plan was postponed in 1931. In 1932, the Board of Transportation modified the plan to further reduce costs, omitting a branch in the Bronx, and truncating the line's southern terminus to the Nassau Street Loop.

Further revision of the plan and more studies followed. By 1939, construction had been postponed indefinitely, with only a short length being completed above the Second Avenue station. The Second Avenue Line was relegated to "proposed" status, and was number 14 on the Board of Transportation's list of important transportation projects. The line was cut to two tracks with single northern branch through Throggs Neck, Bronx, a connection to the BMT Broadway Line in Manhattan, and a continuation south onto the IND Fulton Street Line in Brooklyn via that line's Court Street station. The subway's projected cost went up to US$249 million (equivalent to $5.50 billion in 2025). The United States' entry into World War II in 1941 halted all but the most urgent public works projects, delaying the Second Avenue Line once again.

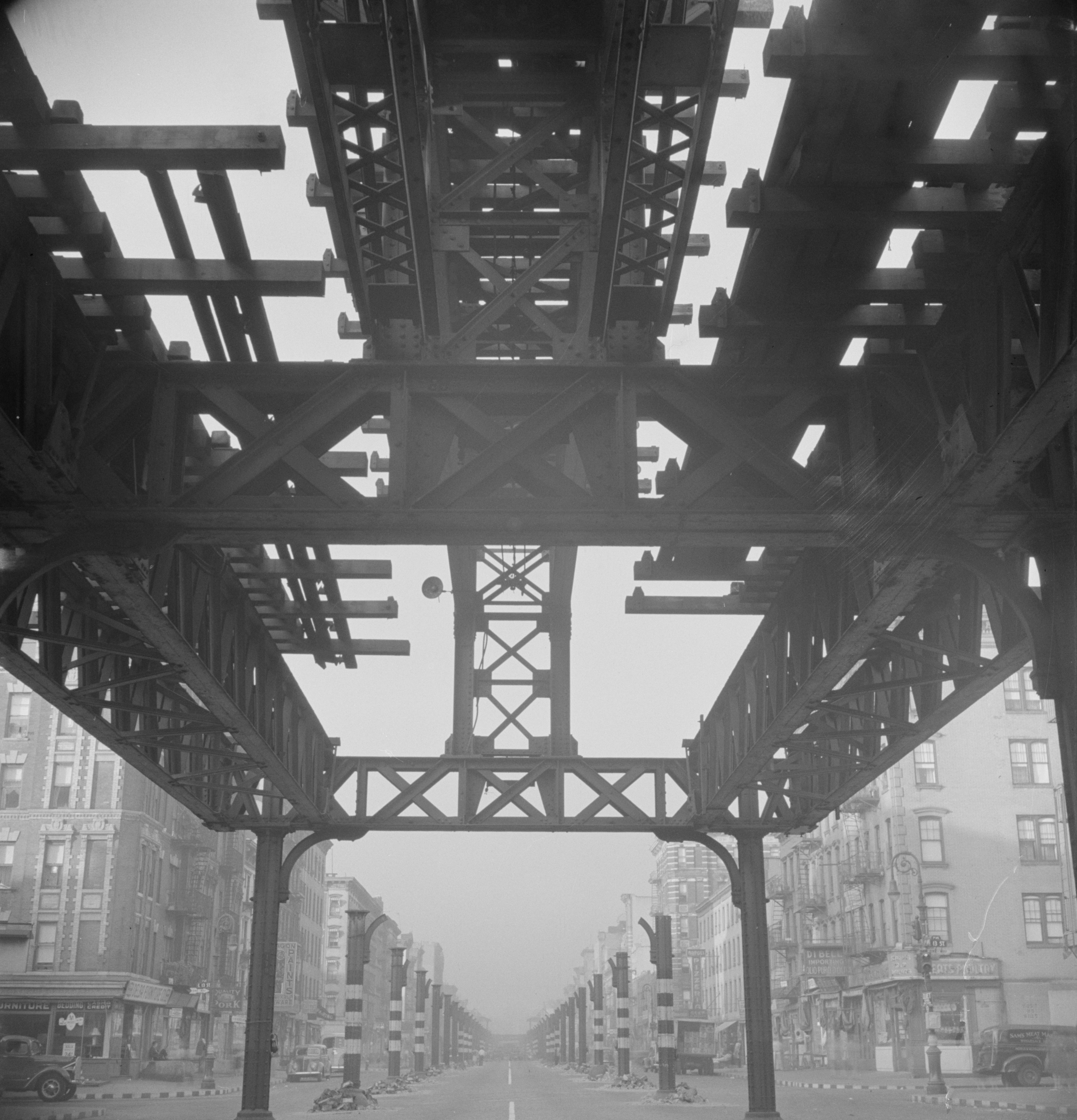
The Second Avenue El was demolished in September 1942. This photo was taken at First Avenue from 13th Street, looking south.

As part of the unification of the three subway companies that comprised the New York City Subway in 1940, elevated lines were being shut down all over the city and replaced by subways. The northern half of the Second Avenue Elevated, serving the Upper East Side and East Harlem, closed on June 11, 1940. The southern half, running through Lower Manhattan, East Midtown and across the Queensboro Bridge to Queens, closed on June 13, 1942. The demolition of the Second Avenue elevated caused overcrowding on the Astoria and Flushing Lines in Queens, which no longer had direct service to Manhattan's far East Side. The elevated line's closure, as well as a corresponding increase in the East Side's population, increased the need for a Second Avenue subway.

In 1944, BOT superintendent Philip E. Pheifer put forth a proposal for Second Avenue Subway services, which would branch extensively off to B Division. The subway was originally to be opened by 1951, but in 1945, plans for the Second Avenue Subway were again revised. Another plan was put forth in 1947 by Colonel Sidney H. Bingham, a city planner and former Interborough Rapid Transit Company (IRT) engineer. O'Dwyer and Gross believed that construction of a Second Avenue subway line would be vital to both increasing capacity on existing lines and allowing new branch lines to be built. Bingham's proposal involved more branch lines and track connections than did Phiefer's, and similar to the 1960s and 1990s phased proposals, was to be built in sections. In 1948, New York City was short $145 million of the $800 million program needed for rehabilitation and proposed capital improvements. The City petitioned the New York State Legislature to exceed its $655 million debt ceiling so that the city could spend $500 million on subway construction, but this request was denied.

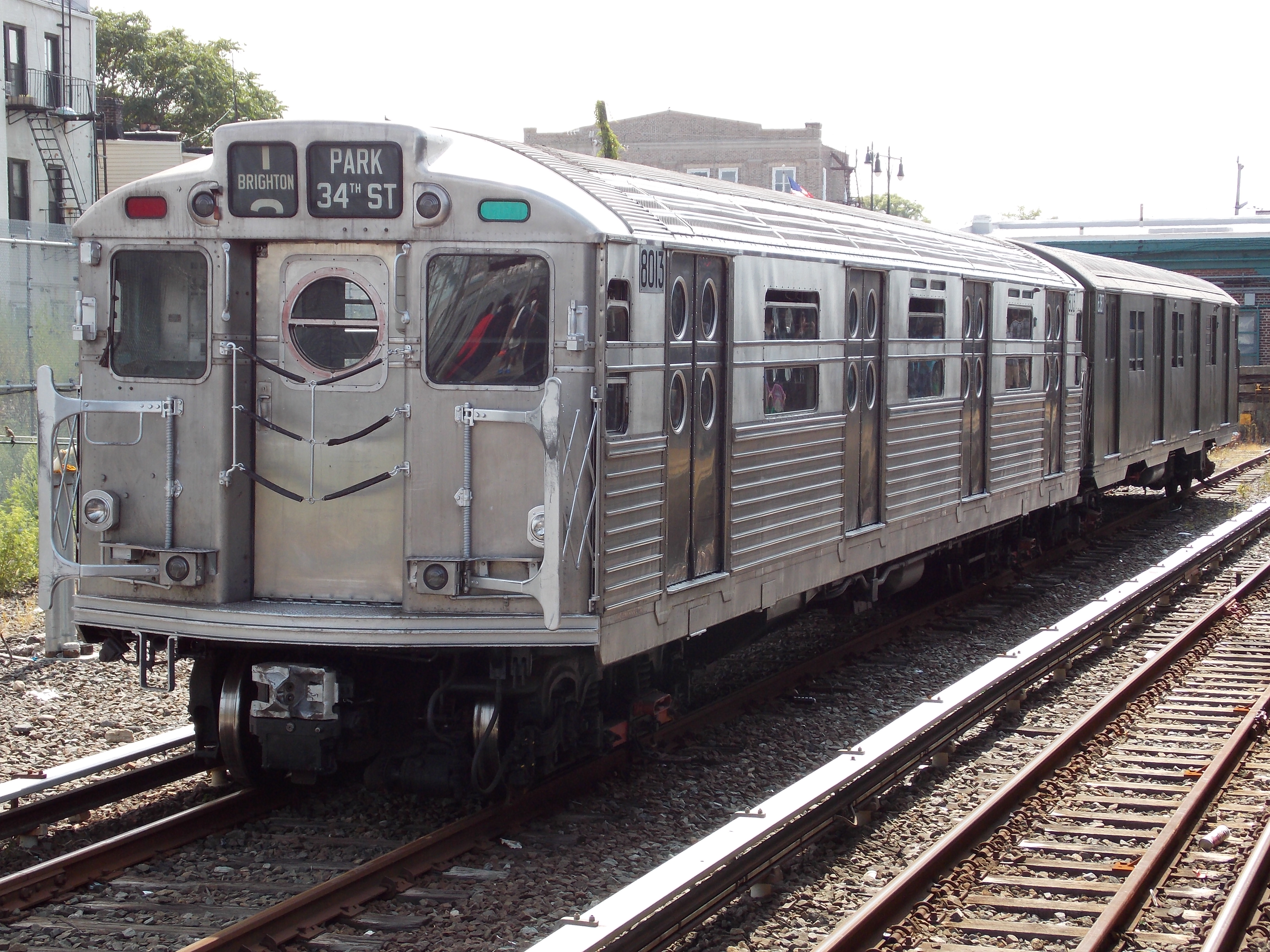
A R11 car, ten of which were built for the Second Avenue Subway.

The BOT then ordered ten new prototype subway cars made of stainless steel from the Budd Company. These R11 cars, so called because of their contract number, were delivered in 1949 and specifically intended for the Second Avenue Subway. They cost US$100,000 (equivalent to $1.40 million in 2025) each; the train became known as the "million dollar train". The cars featured porthole style round windows and a new public address system. Reflecting public health concerns of the day, especially regarding polio, the R11 cars were equipped with electrostatic air filters and ultraviolet lamps in their ventilation systems to kill germs.

In 1949, Queens and Lower Manhattan residents complained that the Second Avenue Subway would not create better transit options for them. In 1950, a revised plan involved connections from Queens. New York voters approved a bond measure for its construction in 1951, and the city was barely able to raise the requisite $559 million for the construction effort. However, the onset of the Korean War caused soaring prices for construction materials and saw the beginning of massive inflation. Money from the 1951 bond measure was diverted to buy new cars, lengthen platforms, and maintain other parts of the aging New York City Subway system. Out of a half-billion-dollar bond measure, only $112 million (equivalent to $1.40 billion in 2025), or 22% of the original amount, went toward the Second Avenue Subway. By then, construction was due to start by either 1952 or 1957, with estimated completion by 1958 at the earliest.

The Third Avenue Elevated, the only other elevated line in the area, closed on May 13, 1955, and was demolished in 1956. The Lexington Avenue Line was now the only subway transportation option on the East Side, leading to overcrowding. By 1957, the 1951 bond issue had been almost entirely used for other projects, and The New York Times despaired of the line's ever being built. "It certainly will cost more than $500 million and will require a new bond issue", wrote one reporter.

=== 1970s construction ===
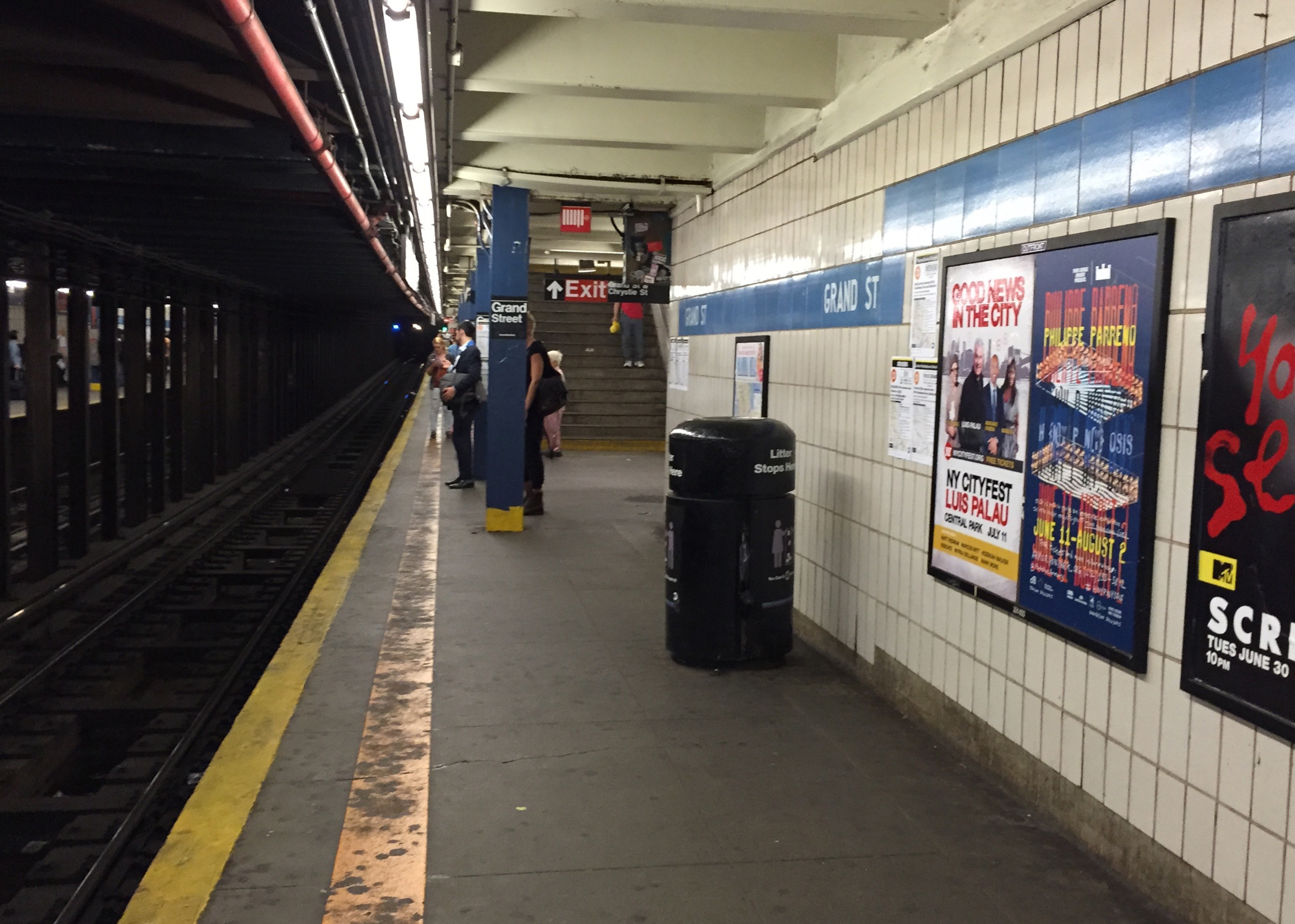
The Grand Street station, built as part of the Chrystie Street Connection, was originally conceived with a possible cross-platform interchange with the Second Avenue Subway.

As the early 1960s progressed, the East Side experienced an increase in development, and the Lexington Avenue Line became overcrowded. In 1962, construction began on a connection between the Manhattan and Williamsburg Bridges and the Sixth Avenue Line. This segment, the Chrystie Street Connection, was first proposed in the 1947 plan as the southern end of the Second Avenue line, which would feed into the two bridges. When opened in November 1967, the connection included the new Grand Street station on the Sixth Avenue Line (another station, 57th Street, opened in July 1968), and introduced the most significant service changes ever carried out in the subway's history. Grand Street, located under Chrystie Street (the southern end of Second Avenue) was designed to include cross-platform transfers between the Sixth Avenue and Second Avenue Lines.

Separately, in 1967, voters approved a $2.5 billion (worth about $24.1 billion in 2025) Transportation Bond Issue, which provided over $600 million (worth $0 billion today) for New York City projects, including for a 1968 Program for Action. The City secured a $25 million Urban Mass Transportation Act (UMTA) grant for initial construction. The Program for Action proposed a Second Avenue line to be built in two phases: a first phase north of 34th Street and a second phase south of there. The Second Avenue project, for a line from 34th Street to the Bronx, was given top priority.

The line's planned stops in Manhattan, spaced farther apart than those on existing subway lines, proved controversial. The Second Avenue line was criticized as a "rich man's express, circumventing the Lower East Side with its complexes of high-rise low- and middle-income housing and slums in favor of a silk stocking route". In response to protests, the MTA added stations at 72nd Street and 96th Street. The MTA issued a plan for a spur line, called the "cuphandle", to serve the heart of the Lower East Side. Branching off from the IND Sixth Avenue Line near the Second Avenue station, the spur would run east on Houston Street, turn north on Avenue C, and turn west on 14th Street, connecting to the BMT Canarsie Line.

A combination of Federal and State funding was obtained for the project. In March 1972, the entire cost of the section between 34th Street and 126th Street, according to the project's Draft Environmental Study, was estimated to be $381 million. In June 1972, it was announced that UMTA would grant $25 million for the construction of this section of the line. The MTA had requested $254 million in federal funds for the northern part of the line. Preliminary estimates of the cost of the southern portion of the line came to $450 million.

Construction on a tunnel segment between 99th and 105th Streets began in October 1972. A second segment between 110th and 120th Street in East Harlem started construction in March 1973. In October 1973, the line's Chinatown segment began construction at Canal Street under the foot of the Manhattan Bridge between Canal and Division Streets. A fourth segment started construction in July 1974, between Second and Ninth Streets in the East Village. In total, construction on the Second Avenue Line during the 1970s spanned over 27 blocks.

The city soon experienced its most dire fiscal crisis yet, due to the stagnant economy of the early 1970s, combined with the massive outflow of city residents to the suburbs. The system was already in decline. The subway had seen a 40% decrease in ridership since 1947, and a $200 million subsidy for the MTA, as well as a 1952 fare increase had not been enough to pay for basic upkeep for the subway system, let alone fund massive expansion projects like the Second Avenue Subway. When plans were finalized in 1971, the subway had been proposed for completion by 1980, but two years later, its completion date was forecast as 2000. In October 1974, the MTA chairman, David Yunich, announced that the completion of the line north of 42nd Street was pushed back to 1983 and the portion to the south in 1988.

In December 1974, New York City mayor Abraham Beame proposed a six-year transit construction program that would reallocate $5.1 billion of funding from the Second Avenue Line to complete new lines in Queens and to modernize the existing infrastructure, which was rapidly deteriorating and in dire need of repair. Beame issued a stop-work order for the line in September 1975, whereupon construction of the section between Second and Ninth Streets was halted, and no other funding was allocated to the line's construction. Besides the Chrystie Street Connection, only three sections of tunnel had been completed. These tunnels were sealed.

In 1978, when the New York City Subway was at its lowest point in its existence, State Comptroller Arthur Levitt stated that there were no plans to finish the line. During the 1980s, plans for the Second Avenue line stagnated. Construction on the 63rd Street Lines continued. The IND portion of the line opened in 1989 and extended to 21st Street–Queensbridge in Long Island City, Queens, but it did not include a connection to the Second Avenue line. Of this failure to complete construction, Gene Russianoff, an advocate for subway riders since 1981, stated: "It's the most famous thing that's never been built in New York City, so everyone is skeptical and rightly so. It's much-promised and never delivered."

=== 1990s plans ===
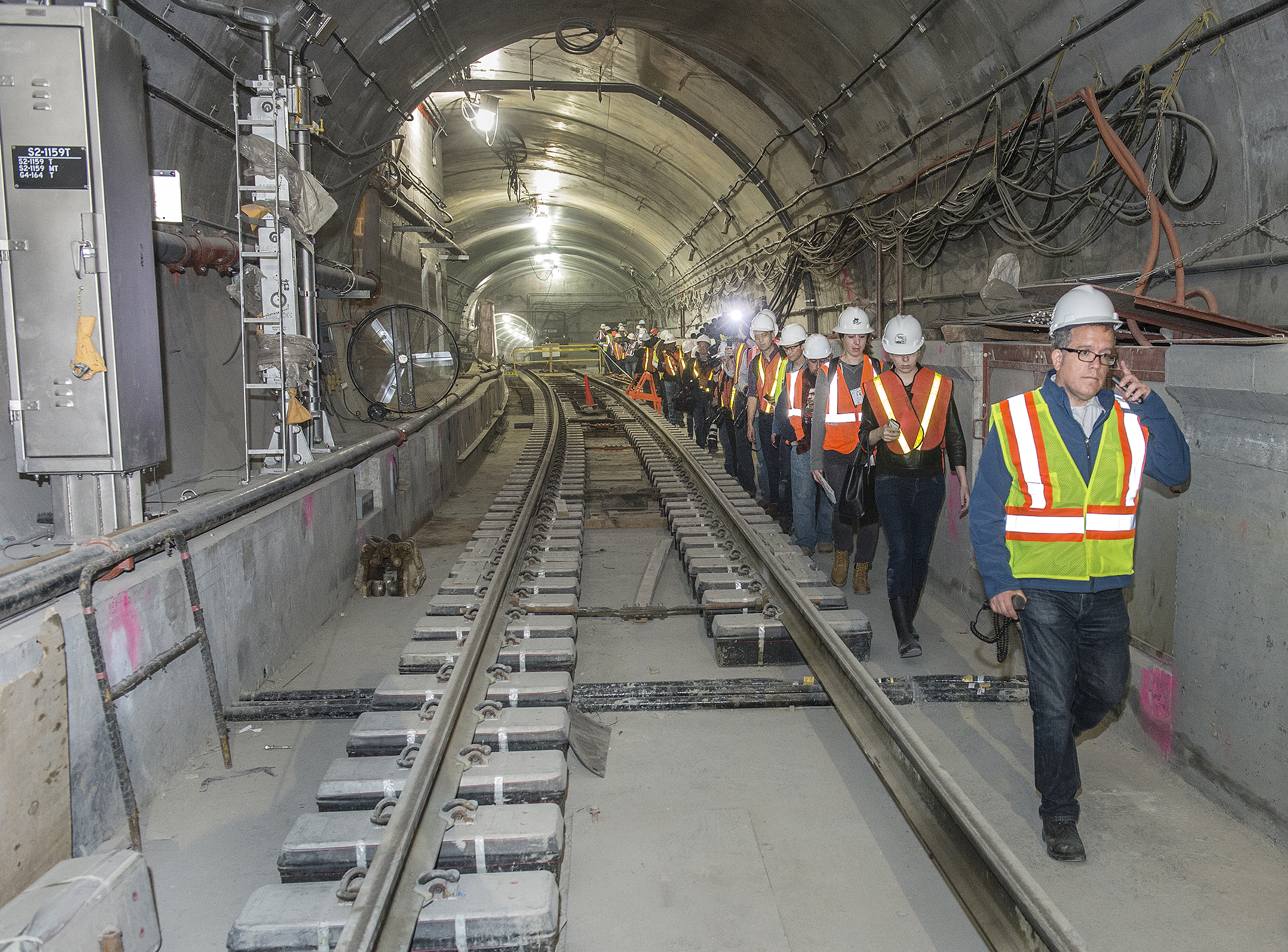
The track junction with the BMT 63rd Street Line south of 72nd Street

With the city's economic and budgetary recovery in the 1990s, there was a revival of efforts to complete construction of the SAS. Rising ridership on the IRT Lexington Avenue Line, the only subway trunk line east of Central Park, demonstrated the need for the Second Avenue Line, as capacity and safety concerns rose. The four-track IRT Lexington Avenue Line, the lone rapid transit option on the Upper East Side and East Harlem since the 1955 closure of the Third Avenue elevated, is the most crowded subway line in the country. The line saw an average of 1.3 million daily riders in 2015. This is more than the daily ridership of the entire second-busiest subway system in the U.S., the Washington Metro, as well as more than the combined daily riderships of San Francisco's and Boston's transit systems. Local bus routes are just as crowded during various times of the day, with the parallel M15 local and M15 Select Bus Service routes seeing 46,000 passengers per weekday in 2016, translating to 14.5 million passengers that year.

In 1991, then-New York Governor Mario Cuomo allocated $22 million to renew planning and design efforts for the Second Avenue line, but two years later, the MTA, facing budget cuts, removed these funds from its capital budget. In 1995, the MTA began its Manhattan East Side Alternatives (MESA) study, both a MIS and a DEIS, seeking ways to alleviate overcrowding on the Lexington Avenue Line and improve mobility on Manhattan's East Side. Second Avenue was chosen over First Avenue for logistical reasons. The MTA started the Lower Manhattan Access Study (LMA) in November 1997. The construction of the Second Avenue Subway from 63rd Street to Lower Manhattan was one of the five building alternatives developed by the study. A 1999 DEIS only proposed new subway service on Second Avenue from 63rd to 125th Street, as well as swapping the local and express services on the Broadway Line. A spur to Grand Central Terminal was considered, but later dropped.

Due in part to strong public support, the MTA Board committed in April 2000 to building a full-length subway line along the East Side, from East Harlem to Lower Manhattan. In May 2000, the MTA Capital Program Review Board approved the MTA's 2000–2004 Capital Program, which allocated $1.05 billion for the construction of the Second Avenue Subway. The next year, a contract for subway design was awarded to a DMJM Harris / Arup joint venture. A new draft statement proposed the full-length line from 125th to 14th Streets; in Lower Manhattan; it was decided to build the line under Water Street.

In December 2001, the Federal Transit Administration approved the start of preliminary engineering on a full-length Second Avenue Subway. The MTA's final environmental impact statement (FEIS) was approved in April 2004. This latest proposal is for a two-track line from 125th Street and Lexington Avenue in Harlem, down Second Avenue to Hanover Square in the Financial District. The final plan called for the full-length Second Avenue line to carry two services: the T, with a route emblem colored turquoise, as well as a rerouted Q train. Phase 1 rerouted the Q, the Broadway Express via the BMT 63rd Street Line and north along Second Avenue, to the Upper East Side at 96th Street. Phase 2 will extend the rerouted Q train to 125th Street and Lexington Avenue. In Phase Three, the new T train will run from 125th Street to Houston Street. The final phase will extend T train service from Houston Street to Hanover Square in Lower Manhattan.

The 1.8-mile (2.9 km) first phase was built within budget, at $4.45 billion. Its construction site was designated as being from 105th Street and Second Avenue to 63rd Street and Third Avenue. Deep bore tunneling methods were to be used in order to avoid the disruptions for road traffic, pedestrians, utilities and local businesses produced by cut-and-cover methods of past generations. Stations were to retain cut-and-cover construction. The total cost of the 8.5-mile (13.7 km) line is expected to exceed $17 billion. In 2014, MTA Capital Construction President Dr. Michael Horodniceanu stated that the whole line may be completed as early as 2029, and would serve 560,000 daily passengers upon completion. As of December 2016, only Phases 1 and 2 would be completed by 2029. The line is described as the New York City Subway's "first major expansion" in more than a half-century. It would add two tracks to fill the gap that has existed since the elevated Second and Third Avenue Lines were demolished in the 1950s. According to the line's final environmental impact statement, the catchment area of the line's first phase would include 200,000 daily riders.

=== Phase 1 construction ===
New York voters passed a transportation bond issue in November 2005, allowing for dedicated funding allocated for that phase. Its passage had been seen as critical to its construction, but the bond was passed only by a narrow margin, with 55% of voters approving and 45% disapproving. At the time, the MTA said that the project would be done in 2012 in case the city's 2012 Summer Olympics bid succeeded, which it had not. In December 2006, the United States Department of Transportation (USDOT) announced that they would allow the MTA to commit up to $693 million in funds to begin construction of the Second Avenue Subway and that the federal share of such costs would be reimbursed with FTA transit funds, subject to appropriations and final labor certification. The USDOT also later gave $1.3 billion in federal funding for the project's first phase, to be funded over a seven-year period. Preliminary engineering and a final tunnel design was completed by a joint venture between Aecom and Arup.

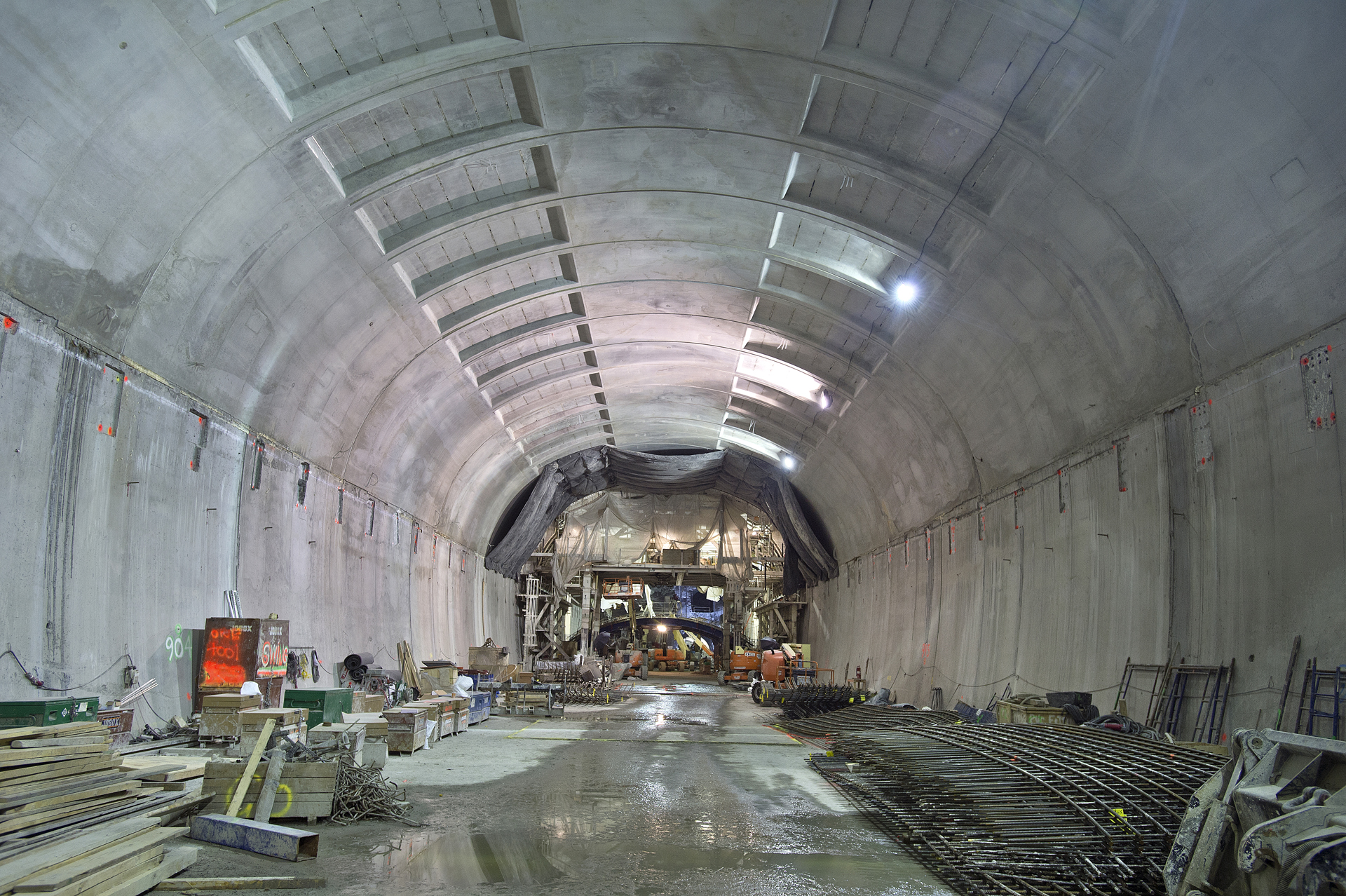
The ceiling of the 86th Street station in December 2013

In March 2007, upon completion of preliminary engineering, the MTA awarded a contract for constructing the tunnels, a launch box for the tunnel boring machine (TBM), and access shafts to S3, a joint venture of Schiavone Construction, Skanska USA Civil, and J.F. Shea Construction. A ceremonial groundbreaking took place on April 12, 2007, at the 99th Street tunnel segment built in the 1970s. Actual construction work began on April 23, 2007. At the time, it was announced that passengers would be able to ride trains on the new line by the end of 2013. Due to cost increases, several features of the subway were cut back soon after construction started: for instance, the 72nd Street station was downsized. The MTA also postponed its completion date several times to 2016.

In 2009, contracts were awarded for the 96th Street station box, as well as for excavation around the 86th Street stations. The TBM began boring the western tunnel southward from 96th Street in 2010. Contracts for tunnels to the Lexington Avenue–63rd Street station, and for the excavation of the 72nd Street station, were awarded in 2010. The following year, contracts were awarded for excavation of the cavern at the 86th Street station, as well as construction for the Lexington Avenue–63rd Street station.

The TBM, digging at a rate of approximately 50 feet (15 m) per day, finished its run at the planned endpoint under 65th Street on February 5, 2011, and started digging the eastern tunnel. On March 28, 2011, S3, having completed its task of completing the 7,200-foot (2,200 m) west tunnel to 65th Street, began drilling the east tunnel to the bellmouth at the existing Lexington Avenue–63rd Street station. The portion of the west tunnel remaining to be created was then mined using conventional drill-and-blast methods. In September 2011, the TBM completed its run to the Lexington Avenue–63rd Street station's bellmouth.

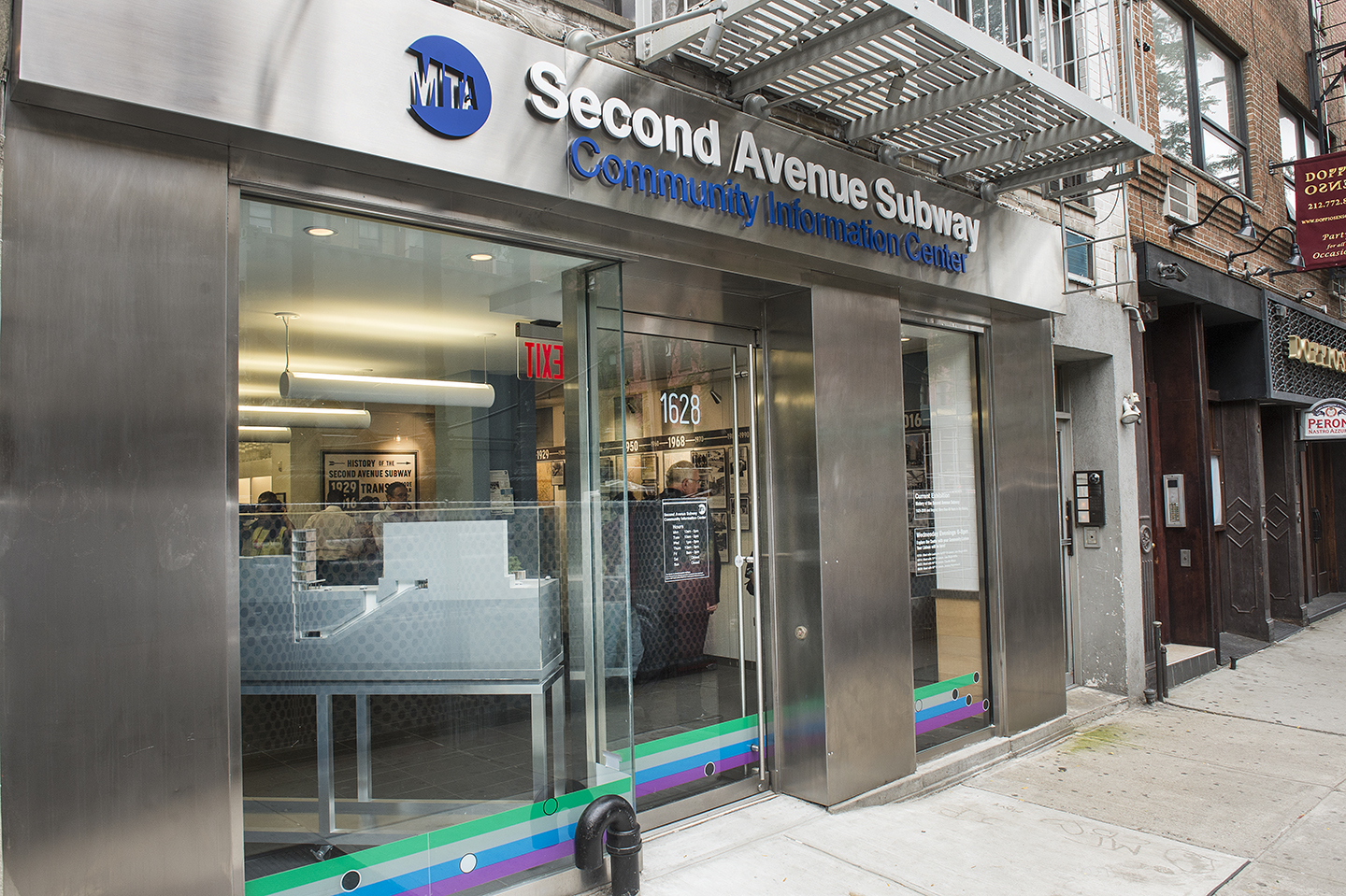
Second Avenue Subway Community Information Center for Phase 1

In July 2013, the MTA opened a Second Avenue Subway Community Information Center for Phase 1 at 1628 Second Avenue between 84th and 85th Streets. In the three years that followed, the center was visited over 20,000 times. The final contract for Phase 1 was awarded in June 2013. Blasting for the station caverns was finished in November 2013, and the muck houses were taken down at around the same time. In late 2013, many of the tracks and signal panels began to arrive at the construction site, to be installed on the line over the next few years.

In February 2016, the MTA allocated $66 million to speed up the construction of the first phase so that it could open in December. Concerns about the line's timely opening persisted through October and November. Test trains started running on October 9, 2016, and out-of-service Q trains started running through the subway in November 2016. The new Third Avenue entrance to the Lexington Avenue–63rd Street station opened on December 30, 2016. The ceremonial first train, with several prominent officials in attendance, ran on New Year's Eve, and regular service began at noon the next day. About 48,200 passengers entered the new stations on January 1, excluding passengers who toured the line by entering at a station in the rest of the system.

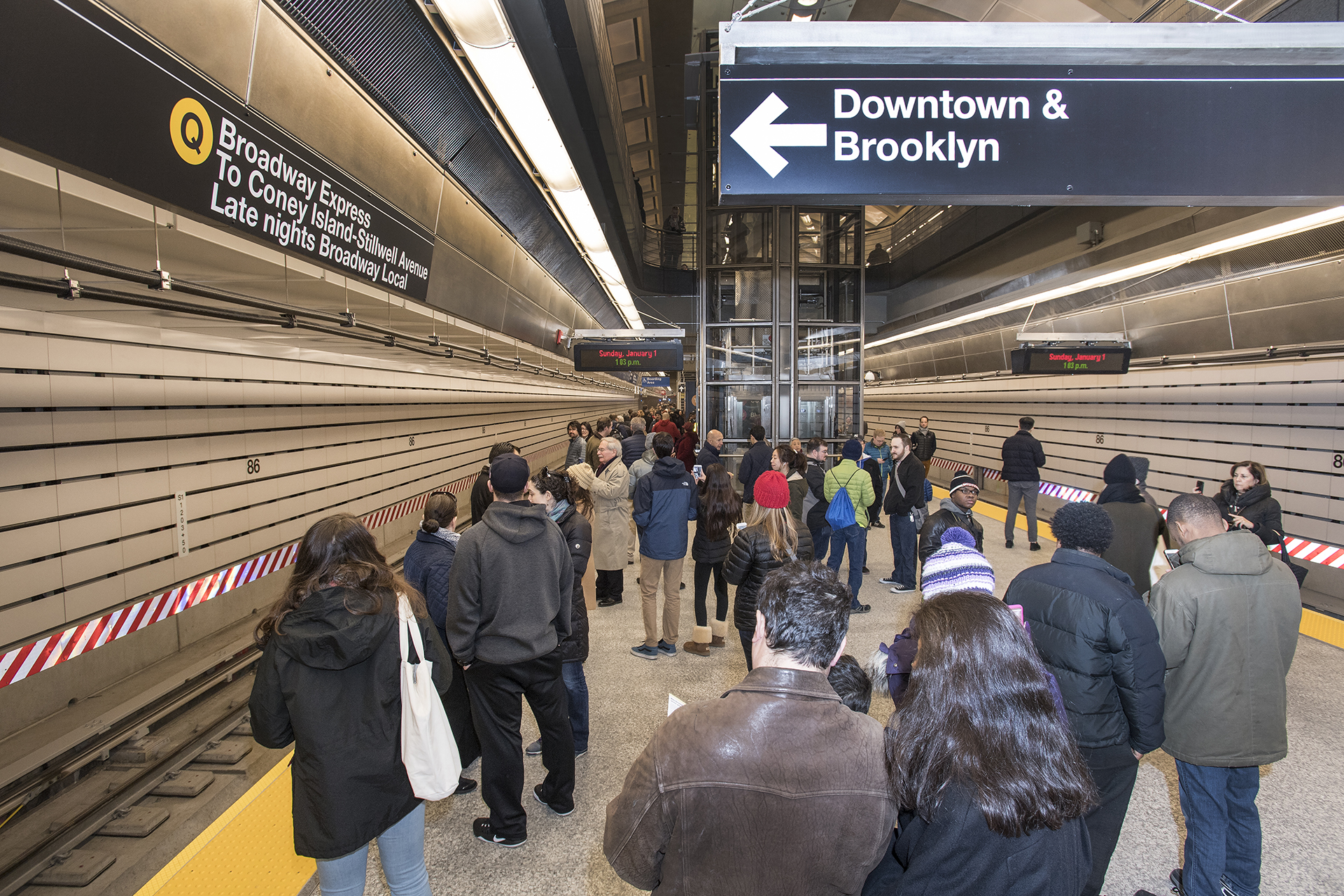
Opening day at 86th Street

Because of the opening of Phase 1, ridership on the Lexington Avenue Line at the 68th Street, 77th Street, 86th Street, and 96th Street stations decreased in January 2017 compared to January 2016. The Second Avenue Line's three stations and the renovated Lexington Avenue–63rd Street station saw an average weekday ridership of more than 150,000 by the end of January. The 72nd Street station was the busiest of the line's new stations, with an average daily ridership of 44,000. By April, taxi usage in the area also saw a decline of more than 20% compared to before the line's opening.

By February 2018, there were 190,000 riders per weekday, within the 5% margin of error for the 200,000-daily-rider estimate given in the Environmental Impact Statement. Rush-hour ridership was within 2% of projections. In November 2017, because of the increasing demand, Q service was increased by one trip during each rush hour, and one northbound R trip was rerouted from the IND Queens Boulevard Line to further boost service. This trip returns southbound in Q service.

=== Phase 2 construction ===
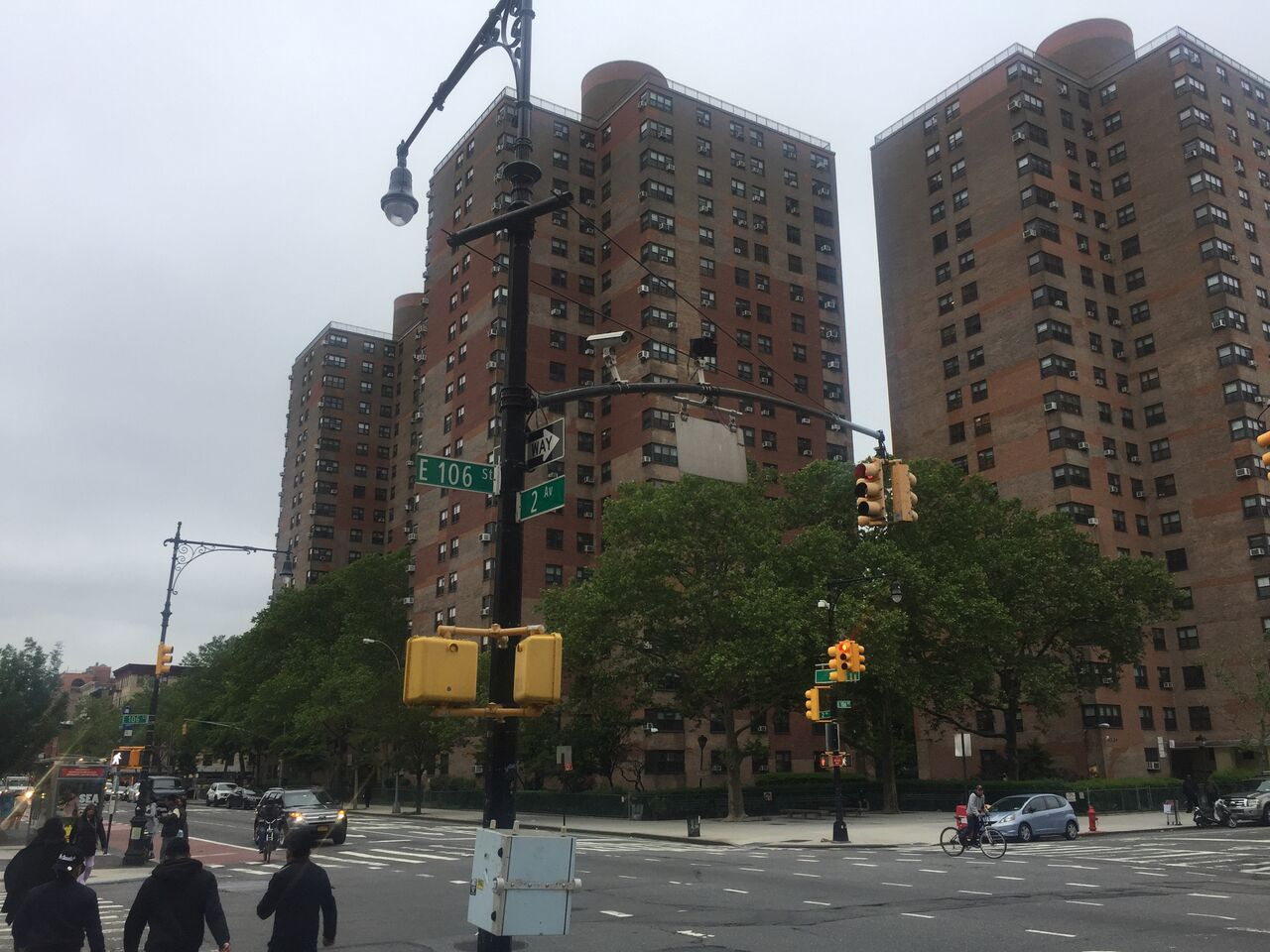
The location of the planned Phase 2 station at 106th Street and Second Avenue

The second phase, between 96th and 125th Streets, was allocated $535 million in the MTA's 2015–2019 Capital Plan for planning, design, environmental studies and utility relocation. Three new stations will be constructed at 125th Street, 116th Street and 106th Street. A transfer to the Lexington Avenue Line and an intermodal connection with Metro-North Railroad would be available at the Harlem–125th Street station.

The original plan called for the main line to turn west onto 125th Street with tail tracks to Fifth Avenue, while tail tracks would continue north on a spur via Second Avenue to 129th Street. However, the tail tracks to 129th Street, as well as a proposed ancillary building at 127th Street and Second Avenue, were removed in a June 2018 update to the plans. A bellmouth provision for extension to the Bronx remains, North of 120th Street, the line will be constructed by TBMs. South of 120th Street, the line will utilize the 99th–105th and 110th–120th Streets tunnel sections built during the 1970s, with a cut-and-cover tunnel connecting the segments between 105th and 110th Streets.

By August 2017, preliminary work on the line was underway, and design of the project was being performed by Phase 2 Partnership, a joint venture of Parsons-Brinckerhoff and STV. The EIS and design were finished in 2018. In July 2018, the MTA published a Supplemental Environmental Assessment for the SAS FEIS. The FTA issued a Finding of No Significant Impact for the project on November 15, 2018. The administration of Joe Biden approved funding for Phase 2 of the Second Avenue Subway in November 2021, and land acquisition for Phase 2 started in April 2022. The MTA began soliciting bids for the first construction contracts in July 2023. The MTA awarded a contract for utility relocations in January 2024, In August 2025, the MTA board awarded a $1.97 billion contract for the construction of tunnels for the northern section of Phase 2 to Connect Plus Partners, a joint venture between Halmar International and FCC Construction. Groundbreaking for Phase 2 took place on June 8, 2026; the tunnels were planned to be completed in 2032.

=== 125th Street Subway – crosstown to Broadway ===
In 2023, the MTA considered extending the line westwards from the Phase 2 terminus of 125th Street in their 2023 Twenty-Year Needs Assessment. An extension to Broadway was considered to deliver "significant benefits". In January 2024, Governor of New York Kathy Hochul announced that the MTA would begin studying a western extension of the line, with three new stations on 125th Street at Malcolm X Boulevard, St. Nicholas Avenue and Broadway. This was estimated to cost around $7.6 billion, however savings could be made by constructing the tunnels concurrently with Phase 2. In January 2026, the MTA published initial feasibility work on the extension to Broadway, estimating that the extension would have around 164,000 daily riders, cost around $7.7 billion to build, with tunneling starting in 2028. To navigate the "mixed-face" geology of 125th Street—a complex layer of loose sand, gravel, and high water tables—the study recommended using pressurized tunnel boring machines, digging a tunnel up to 100 feet (30 m) deep beneath existing subway tunnels. The report proposed a "tunnel-only" strategy that could save hundreds of millions of dollars by reusing the Phase 2 machines for the 125th Street expansion.

=== Phases 3 and 4 – south to Hanover Square ===
Phase 3, which has no funding commitments, would extend the line southward along Second Avenue from 63rd Street to Houston Street. Upon its completion, a new service will operate running between 125th and Houston Streets. Phases 2 and 3 may cost up to a combined total of $14.2 billion.

Phase 4, which also has no funding commitments, will provide an extension from Houston Street to a permanent terminus, with storage tracks, at Hanover Square. These storage tracks, initially recommended in the SDEIS, would allow for the storage of four trains, and they would run south of Hanover Square from Coenties Slip to a traffic island near Peter Minuit Plaza at a depth of 110 feet (34 m). The Hanover Square terminal is only planned to be able to turn back 26 trains per hour instead of 30 as less capacity will be needed on the line south of 63rd Street. The Hanover Square station will be deep enough to allow for the potential extension of Second Avenue Subway service to Brooklyn through a new tunnel under the East River.

== Design and cost ==
=== Features ===
The stations on the line were built to be wider than most other underground subway stations in the system. Because of this, Horodniceanu likened the Second Avenue Subway stations to the stations on the Washington Metro. All stations on the line feature 615-foot-long (187 m) platforms, with 800–1,400 ft (240–430 m) overall lengths to provide space for power stations and ventilation plants. Tracks are built on rubber pads, which reduces noise from trains.

In August 2006, the MTA revealed that all future subway stations—including stations on the Second Avenue Subway and the 7 Subway Extension, as well as the new South Ferry station—would be outfitted with air-cooling systems to reduce the temperature along platforms by as much as 10 °F (6 °C). In early plans, the Second Avenue Subway was also to have platform screen doors to assist with air-cooling, energy savings, ventilation, and track safety, but this plan was scrapped in 2012 as cost-prohibitive. Platform screen doors may be constructed at Phase 2 stations depending on the results of studies being conducted for their installation elsewhere.

=== Construction methods ===
The construction of the 8.5 miles (13.7 km) of the Second Avenue Subway underneath densely populated Manhattan will require the use of several construction methods, depending on the section of the line. The line's tunnels will largely consist of twin tunnels with diameters of up to 23.5 feet (7.2 m). About 90% of the tunneling is to be performed by tunnel boring machines. The rest will be done using the cut-and-cover method, or through the use of mined drill-and-blast, for sections averaging 275 meters (902 ft) in length, namely the station boxes. The methods used to construct the sections of the line were confirmed in 2003, with a modification of the section north of 120th Street announced in 2016.

Phases 1 & 2			Phases 3 & 4
Streets	Construction method	Remarks	Streets	Construction method	Remarks
Lenox–Park Avs	Soft Ground Tunnels		64–58	Tunnel Boring Machine
Park–3 Avs	Mined with Cut and Cover	125 St Station	58–56	Cut and Cover	55 St Station
3 Av–120 St	Tunnel Boring Machine		56–43	Tunnel Boring Machine
120–118	Rebuilt, existing	Bellmouth / TBM Launch ↑	43–41	Mined with Cut and Cover	42 St Station
118–115	Rebuilt, existing	116 St Station	41–34	Tunnel Boring Machine
115–109	Existing		34–32	Cut and Cover	34 St Station
109–105	Cut and Cover	106 St Station	32–24	Tunnel Boring Machine
105–99	Existing		24–22	Mined with Cut and Cover	23 St Station
99–92	Cut and Cover	96 St Station / TBM Launch ↓	22–15	Tunnel Boring Machine
92–86	Tunnel Boring Machine		15–11	Cut and Cover	14 St Station
86–83	Mined with Cut and Cover	86 Street Station	11–Hanover	Undecided
83–72	Tunnel Boring Machine
72–69	Mined with Cut and Cover	72 Street Station
69–63	Tunnel Boring Machine

==== Phase 1 ====
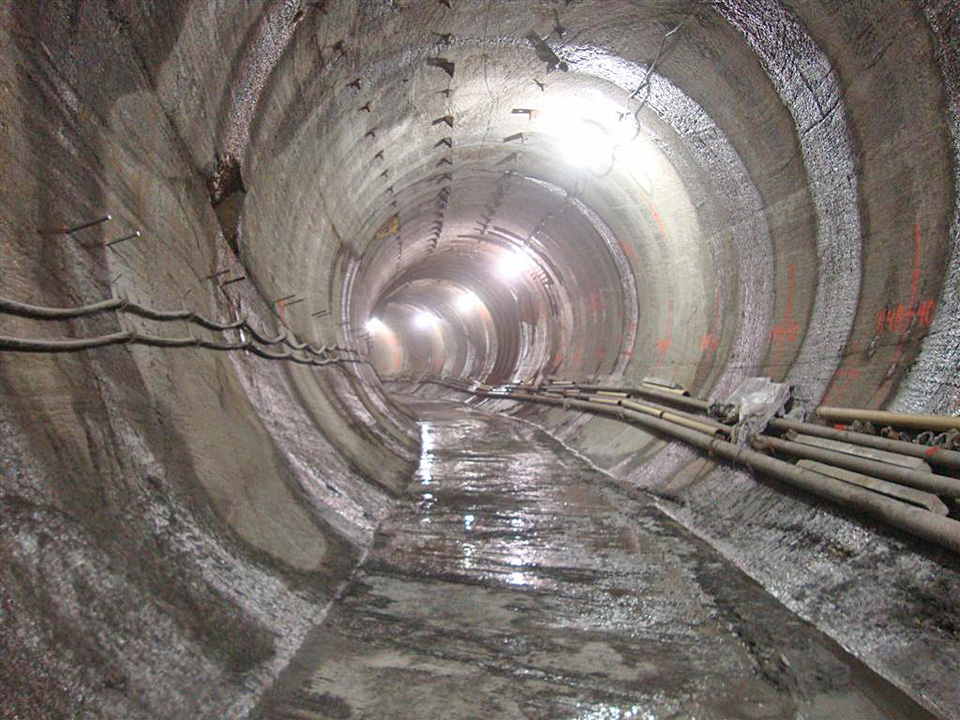
Tunnel at 64th Street

Phase 1 of the Second Avenue Subway was constructed between the Lexington Avenue–63rd Street station on the 63rd Street Lines and an existing tunnel segment between 99th Street and 105th Street, with a terminal station at 96th Street. In Phase 1, tunneling was completed between East 63rd Street and East 92nd Streets through the use of TBMs. The TBM launch box was 814-by-75-foot-wide (248 by 23 m), and is now part of the 96th Street station. Two access shafts were constructed for the 72nd Street station. Slurry or diaphragm walls, 1.1 meters (3.6 ft) wide and 6.1 meters (20 ft) long and about 35 meters (115 ft) deep, were built alongside the sections between East 93rd and 95th Streets.

Since the rock is shallower between East 91st and 93rd Streets, 1.1-meter-diameter (3.6 ft) secant piles did the same work at shallower depths. Earth excavation was conducted between walls once they were installed, and box structures were built using a bottom-up construction method. Temporary decking constituted the top of the boxes, and the decking both braced the excavation and supported the walls and Second Avenue traffic.

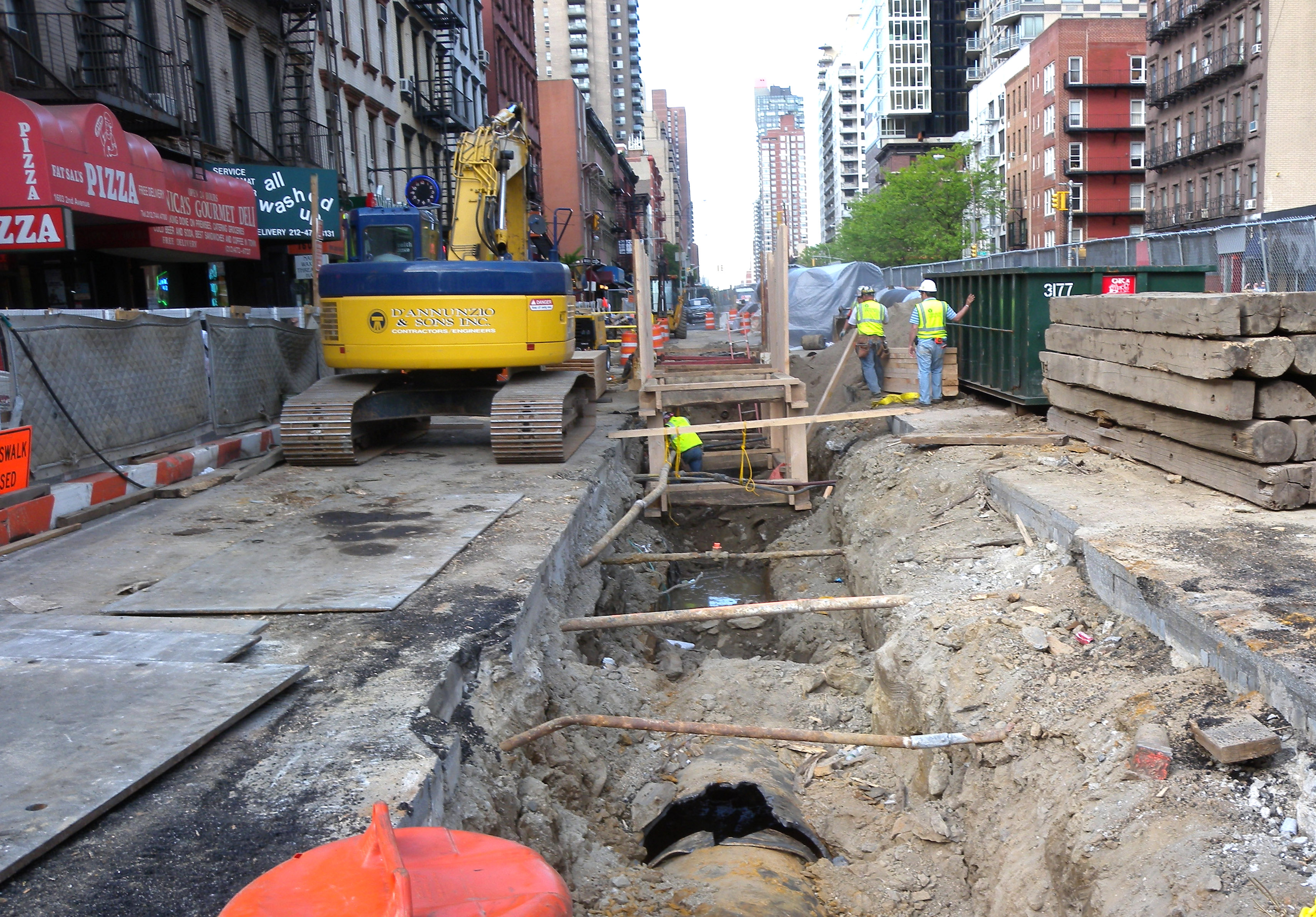
Street-level work at 83rd Street

The stations at 86th and 72nd Streets were mined. This was challenging, given the number of expensive high rise properties in their vicinity. The 96th Street cut-and-cover station was about 15 meters (49 ft) deep, making it one of the shallowest stations being built on the line. The shallowness was so that the new line could align with the preexisting piece of subway tunnel built in the 1970s between 99th and 105th Streets. Stations at the two mined stations are between 25.9 and 27.4 meters (85 and 90 ft) deep in rock. The construction method that was used was supposed to ease concerns for buildings above the station sites, because only two shafts were required for excavation.

Of the below-ground obstacles, Arup director of construction David Caiden stated: "It's a spaghetti of tunnels, utilities, pipes and cables—I've never seen anything like it." Complicating the process, the project must go over, or under, subway lines, Amtrak railway lines, and the Queens-Midtown Tunnel linking Manhattan and Queens, in later phases. There were geological anomalies along the way of Phase 1. Manhattan's geology changes along the subway's length, passing through rock and soft ground, consisting of sands, silts, and clays over Manhattan schist, and there are faults and shear zones as well as fractured rock.

Hard-rock TBMs 6.7 meters (22 ft) in diameter, 450 feet (140 m) in length, and 485 short tons (433 long tons) in weight were used to tunnel during the first phase, progressing at a rate of about 20 meters (66 ft) per day.

==== Phase 2 ====
Phase 2 will extend the line north from the 96th Street station to the Harlem–125th Street subway station at Lexington Avenue. North of 120th Street, it will be constructed through the use of TBMs. The TBM Launch Box will be located between 118th Street and 120th Street on Second Avenue. The TBMs will head north under Second Avenue from 120th Street before turning slightly east to curve under the Wagner Houses, turning west on 125th Street, crossing Lexington Avenue, before ending either 325 feet (99 m) east of Lenox Avenue or 275 feet (84 m) to the west of Lenox Avenue to accommodate storage tracks. The tunnels near the 125th Street station would need to go through soft soil in addition to diving underneath the existing IRT Lexington Avenue Line. The soft-soil tunnels are in contrast to the hard-rock bored tunnels south of 92nd Street and the cut-and-cover tunnels north of that point (necessitated because Manhattan's rock profile drops sharply north of 92nd Street). The line is designed as to not preclude the construction of a station at Lenox Avenue and the extension of the line west along 125th Street.

South of 120th Street, the line will utilize a tunnel section built during the 1970s, located between 110th Street and 120th Street. This section will have tracks and other essential equipment installed, like that of the rest of the line. Cut-and-cover will be used to connect the existing tunnel section to the bored section to the north (at 120th Street) and to the portion of the line already in operation to the south (at 105th Street) to maximize the use of the tunnel sections built in the 1970s. A bellmouth will be constructed to allow for a future extension to the Bronx at 118th Street. The storage tracks west of the 125th Street station would replace the storage tracks north of the 96th Street station, which would then be used in revenue service as part of Phase 2.

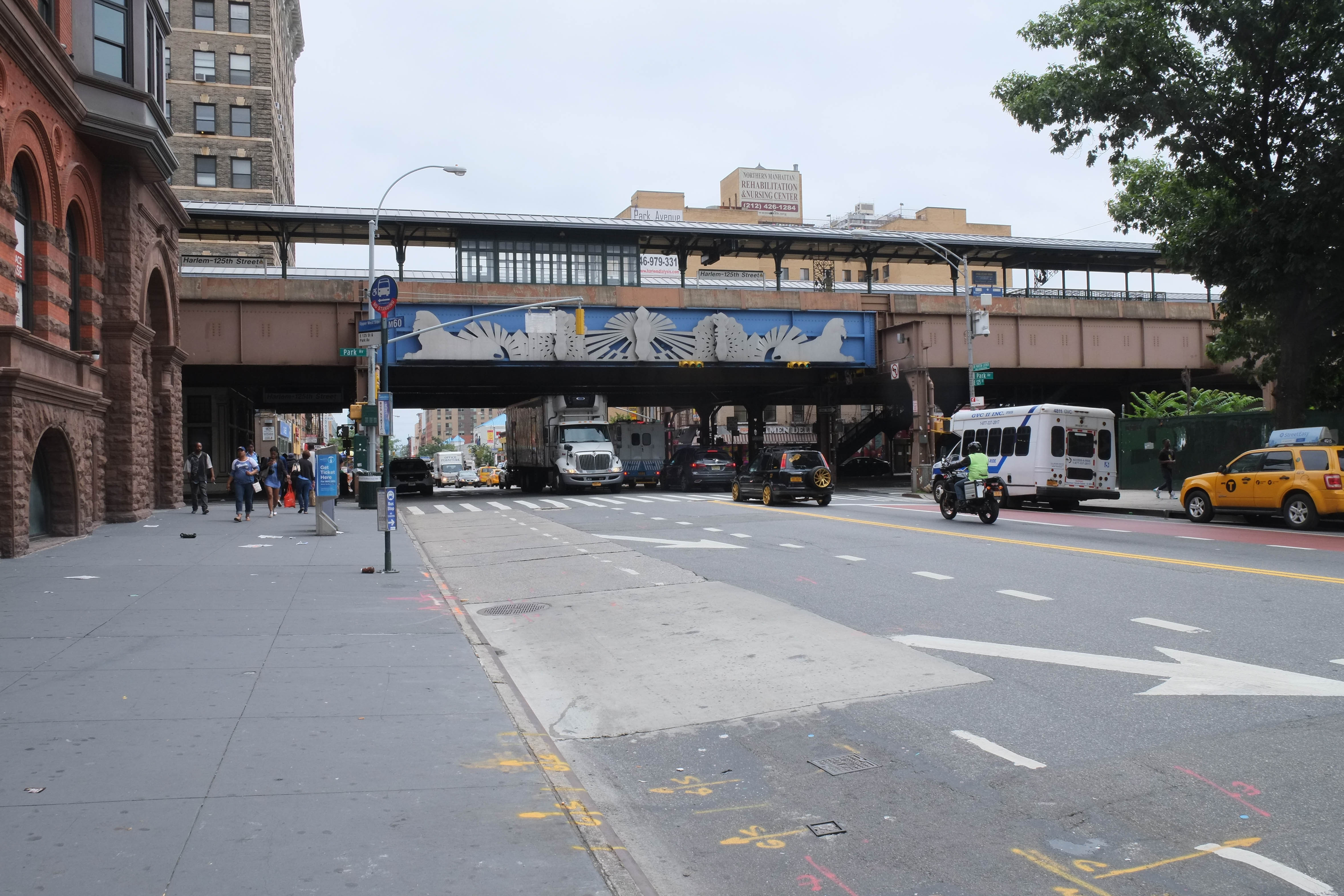
The Harlem–125th Street subway station, planned as part of phase 2, would contain an intermodal transfer to Metro-North trains at Harlem–125th Street (pictured).

A transfer will be constructed at the eastern end of the Second Avenue Subway's Harlem–125th Street station to connect to the IRT Lexington Avenue Line's 125th Street station. A new lower-level mezzanine will house the connection between the two stations, directly connecting to the downtown platform for Lexington Avenue service. The direct connection to the staircases to the upper level will be rebuilt. At the western end of the station, staircases will lead to Park Avenue, allowing passengers to walk to the Metro-North Railroad's Harlem–125th Street station.

The station entrances for 106th Street and 116th Street will be located on the east side of Second Avenue so as to avoid utilities located on the west side of the street and to avoid potential adverse effects to the East Harlem Historic District.

==== Phases 3 and 4 ====
Phases 3 and 4 will extend the line south from 63rd Street to Houston Street and Hanover Square, respectively. As part of Phase 3, a connection to the IND 63rd Street Line would be built, allowing for non-revenue moves into Queens. This connection will be constructed through underground drilling and blasting. Bellmouths already exist for this connection east of the Lexington Avenue–63rd Street station. This section, like the rest of the line, will mainly consist of a two-track line. Between 21st Street and 9th Street, two additional tracks will be constructed on either side of the main alignment to allow for the storage of eight trains. This location was selected due to the sufficient depth of the area. The third phase would pass above several East River tunnels, including the 63rd Street Tunnel, the 60th Street Tunnel, the 53rd Street Tunnel, the Steinway Tunnel at 42nd Street, and the East River Tunnels at 32nd and 33rd Streets.

Like Phase 1, the sections between stations will largely be constructed through the use of TBMs, while stations will be constructed through cut-and-cover and mining, allowing for the construction of station caverns, shafts, and entrances. Five transfers are planned to connect stations on the Second Avenue Line and nearby stations on adjacent lines, increasing travel options for passengers. The transfer at Grand Street will require the construction of a mezzanine below the existing station, allowing for a vertical transfer to be constructed. The existing station will have to be rebuilt to accommodate the increased volume of passengers using the station. The Houston Street station's transfer to the Second Avenue station of the IND Sixth Avenue Line would require some construction within the existing station.

The remaining three transfers are being proposed, and will be constructed, barring the increased cost of their construction. The transfer to the BMT Canarsie Line's Third Avenue station would consist of a passageway that will be 200 feet (61 m) long. The most complicated of the transfers will be the connection between the 42nd Street station and the Grand Central station on the IRT Flushing Line. To allow for the connection to be built, a 900-foot long tunnel would be built under 42nd Street from the west side of Third Avenue to Second Avenue.

The Flushing Line station might have to be significantly reconstructed in anticipation of the increased volume of passengers and due to Americans with Disabilities Access requirements for the transfer. To allow for necessary vents and emergency exits to be built, cut-and-cover would be used. The final transfer would be between the 55th Street station and the Lexington Avenue–53rd Street station on the IND Queens Boulevard Line. Either shielded mining or cut-and-cover would be used to complete the connection. The existing station would have to be modified to allow for the transfer passageway to be built.

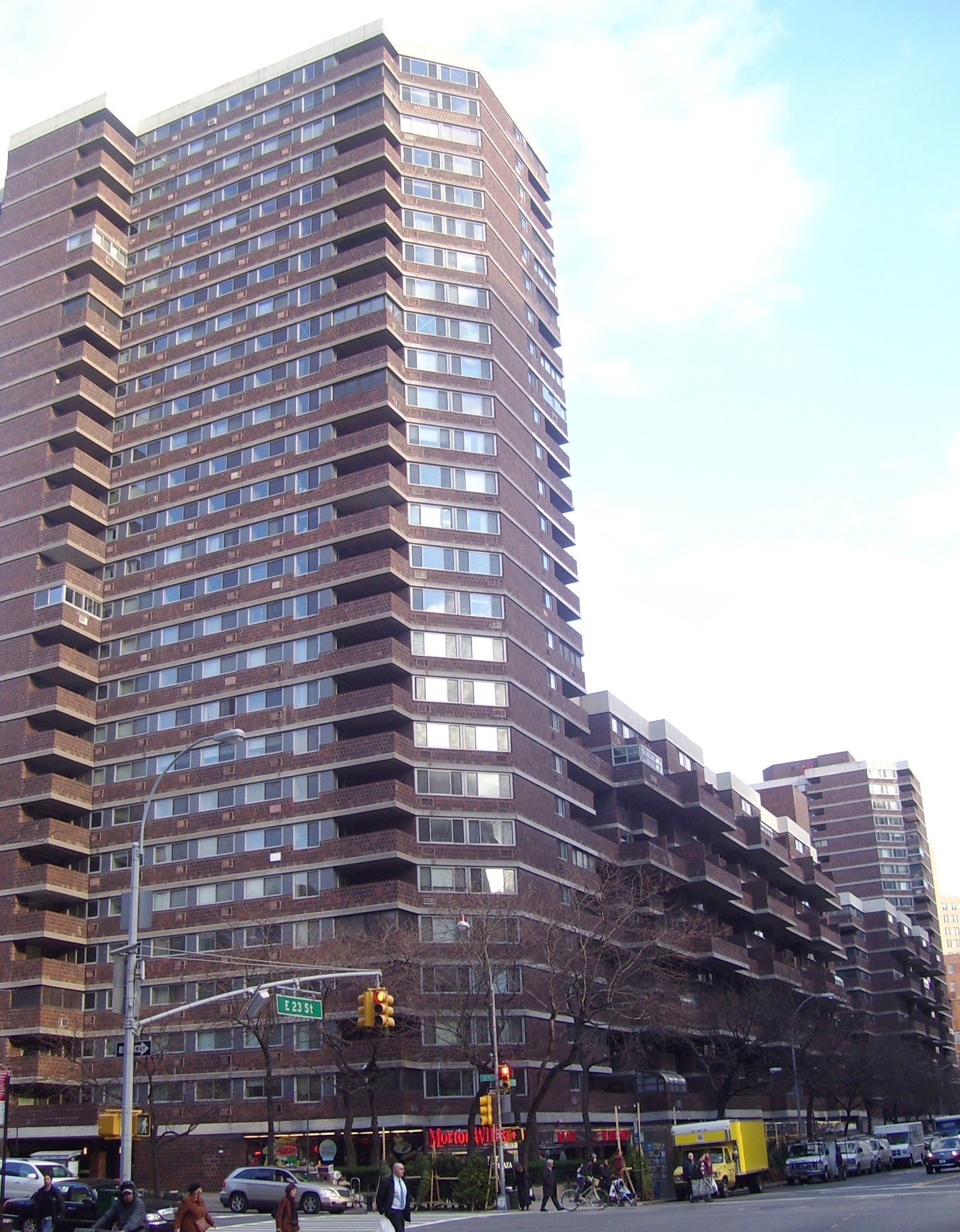
As part of Phase 3, a station would be built at Second Avenue and 23rd Street (pictured).

Three construction options were evaluated during the project's Environmental Impact Study for the portion of the line between 11th Street and Hanover Square. One option known as the Shallow Chrystie Option would mainly use cut and cover, while the Deep Chrystie Street and Forsyth Options would use a combination of tunneling by Earth Pressure Balance Machines (EPBMs) and cut and cover. The Shallow Chrystie Option would have used the existing Confucius Plaza tunnel section between Canal and Division Streets. Like the plan from the 1970s, there would have been a cross-platform transfer to the existing Grand Street station, with the transfer expected to be heavily used.

This option would require digging up Sara Delano Roosevelt Park to the east as Chrystie Street is not wide enough to fit four tracks. Under this option, a track connection would be built to allow trains from Second Avenue to run via the Manhattan Bridge north tracks to allow service to Brooklyn. The Forsyth Option would curve below the park to Forsyth Street and the station would be built under Forsyth Street, requiring a 200-foot transfer passageway that would be less convenient than the other options.

The Deep Chrystie Option would have the Second Avenue Subway run deeper underground, running underneath the existing Grand Street station, with a mezzanine in between the two stations. In order to allow for sufficient room for stairways to transfer to the Second Avenue Line, the Grand Street station would be widened to have twenty foot wide platforms. No track connection would be built under this option, and the Confucius Plaza tunnel section would not be used for subway service, but it instead might be used for ancillary subway facilities. Currently, this is the preferred option.

South of the terminal at Hanover Square, two tail tracks will be constructed through the use of a TBM to allow for the storage of four trains. The tracks would be built at a depth of about 110 feet (34 m) under Water Street, allowing the line to be deep enough to tunnel under the East River for a possible future extension into Brooklyn. Cut-and-cover would be used to build a vent facility at a traffic island located at Water and Whitehall Streets.

=== Cost ===
There was controversy over the high cost of the line as a whole. The project was divided up into four phases, in part, to maximize the ability of the project to receive funding from the Federal Government as part of the Department of Transportation's New Starts Program. The initial projections for the cost of the line were made in the 2004 FEIS, with Phase 1 estimated to cost $3.8 billion, Phase 2 estimated to cost $3.4 billion, and Phases 3 and 4 each estimated to cost $4.8 billion.

Phase 1 ended up costing $500 million over its original budget of $3.8 billion—still a very high price compared to other new subway systems worldwide. Regulations set by the Buy America Act forced the MTA to purchase materials made in the United States, which led to objections when an MTA contractor bought a fire suppression system made in Finland. Finally, the private and public sector could not cooperate smoothly on the project, further raising costs. Of the $4.5 billion cost for Phase 1, $2.4 billion was allocated to building the three new stations and renovating the Lexington Avenue–63rd Street station. Meanwhile, $500 million was spent on design and engineering, and another $734 million was for building tunnels between the stations, tracks, signals, and trackside systems.

The rest of the cost, $800 million, was spent on "construction management, real estate, station artwork, fare-collection systems and other sundry items". The stations' cost was magnified by the depth of the stations and the enormity of the caverns that needed to be excavated. The Second Avenue Subway stations have full-length mezzanines, like the original IND but unlike other deep-level projects such as London's Elizabeth line. The stations will have full-length mezzanines as opposed to smaller mezzanines for each entrance to accommodate anticipated ridership for the full-length line and to comply with emergency egress requirements.

In December 2016, after it was announced that Phase 2 might cost $6 billion, transit experts expressed concern that the Second Avenue Subway might be so excessively costly as to preclude construction of Phases 3 and 4, as well as future expansions. One expert stated that the Phase 1 project was the most expensive subway project in the world, and that compared to other subway systems around the world, the cost of building new subways in New York City was much higher. The Second Avenue Subway's per-mile construction cost is higher than that of other projects in similar cities like London's Crossrail and Paris's Grand Paris Express, which themselves are among the most expensive underground-railway projects in the world. MTA officials stated that the Second Avenue Subway cost as much as it did only because of the complex underground infrastructure in Manhattan, as well as the fact that the New York City Subway operates 24/7 service.

=== Artwork ===
For Phase 1 of the Second Avenue Subway, four contemporary artists were chosen to design artwork for the 96th, 86th, 72nd, and 63rd Street stations. The project consisted of four permanent installations: Blueprint for a Landscape by Sarah Sze at 96th Street; Subway Portraits by Chuck Close at 86th Street; Perfect Strangers by Vik Muniz at 72nd Street; and Elevated by Jean Shin at 63rd Street. These public artworks were sponsored and commissioned as part of the MTA Arts & Design program.

== Service patterns ==
=== Routes ===

The opening of Phase 1 extended Q service to 96th Street from its former terminal at 57th Street. The Q service has a rush-hour service frequency of 7 to 10 trains per hour. By contrast, the IRT Lexington Avenue Line's express tracks (4 and 5 trains) have an estimated rush-hour frequency of 30 trains per hour, or one train approximately every 2 minutes in each direction. As part of the 2004 Final Environmental Impact Study (FEIS) for the line, the Q service was planned to have a frequency of 14 trains per hour during rush hours, but this was revised due to MTA schedule changes.

A few rush hour N trains that formerly short-turned at 57th Street began to run to 96th Street in January 2017. The northbound trips are labeled as Q trains via the Sea Beach Line to reduce passenger confusion. Starting in November 2017, one northbound R train has served the line during weekday mornings, boosting service. From April 2019 to April 2020, weekend and evening M service was also diverted on the Second Avenue Subway to accommodate extra passengers during the 14th Street Tunnel shutdown.

In Phase 2, all current services will be extended to 125th Street and Lexington Avenue. As part of the 2004 FEIS, it was planned for the Q service to be increased to 19 trains per hour to accommodate the projected increase in ridership. In order to allow for the construction of Phase 3, bellmouths have been constructed at the turnoff to the IND 63rd Street Line.

=== Future full-length designation ===

When the construction of Phase 3 is completed, a new T service will operate from Broadway to Houston Street. After Phase 4 opens, T service will run the full length of the line, from Broadway to Hanover Square. T service is planned to operate at a frequency of 14 trains per hour during rush hours, with the combined frequency north of 72nd Street with Q service being 28 trains per hour. With the opening of Phase 3, the frequency of Q service is planned to be reduced from 19 to 14 trains per hour.

The MTA decided to designate the future service with the letter T, in part because:

- H is the Rockaway Park Shuttle's internal route designator, which has occasionally been used publicly, most notably from 1986–93 and again in 2012–13 following Hurricane Sandy.
- The letters I and O are too easily confused with the numbers 1 and 0, respectively.
- The letter K was used until the late 1980s to denote services on the IND Eighth Avenue Line, and earlier on the BMT Jamaica Line, and thus is not preferred.
- The letters P, U and Y are more easily confused with common words.
- The letter V was in use at the time (and until 2010) to denote services on the IND Sixth Avenue Line and IND Queens Boulevard Line.

The T's route emblem is colored turquoise (hex triplet #00ADD0, which could also be considered robin's egg blue or teal) because the color had also been used for the JFK Express in the past. In 2011, turquoise was considered "the color of the year", and at the time of the color's selection in the 2000s, it was considered a very upscale color.

== Station listing ==
Three stations are part of Phase 1, which opened in January 2017. Three more are planned for Phase 2 (including one transfer to an existing line); three more in the 125th Street Subway extension (including three transfers); six more in Phase 3 (including up to four transfers); and four more in Phase 4 (including one transfer).

Station service legend
Stops all times	Stops 24 hours a day
Stops all times except late nights	Stops every day during daytime hours only
Stops late nights only	Stops every day during overnight hours only
Stops weekdays during the day	Stops during weekday daytime hours only
Stops weekends and weekday evenings	Stops during weekend daytime and weekday evening hours
Stops rush hours only	Stops during weekday rush hours only
Station closed	Station closed
Time period details
Disabled access	Station is compliant with the Americans with Disabilities Act
↑	Station is compliant with the Americans with Disabilities Act in the indicated direction only
↓	Station is compliant with the Americans with Disabilities Act in the indicated direction only
	Elevator access to mezzanine only

Neighborhood (approximate)	Disabled access	Station	Location	Phase	Services	Opened	Transfers & Notes
Manhattanville, Morningside Heights	Disabled access	Broadway	125th Street & Broadway	125 St Subway		(proposed)	1 train via transfer at 125th Street (Note: Select in-system transfers that have been confirmed if the full-length line is constructed.); Northern terminal for Q train (125 St Subway) and T train (Phase 3)
Harlem	Disabled access	St. Nicholas Avenue	125th Street & St. Nicholas Avenue	125 St Subway		(proposed)	A B C D trains via transfer at 125th Street; M60 SBS (to LaGuardia Airport)
Harlem	Disabled access	Malcolm X Boulevard	125th Street & Malcolm X Boulevard	125 St Subway		(proposed)	2 3 trains via transfer at 125th Street; M60 SBS (to LaGuardia Airport)
East Harlem	Disabled access	Harlem–125th Street	125th Street & Lexington–Park Avenues	2		September 2032 (under construction)	4 5 6 <6> trains via transfer at 125th Street; M60 SBS (to LaGuardia Airport); Metro-North Railroad at Harlem–125th Street; Northern terminal for Q train (Phase 2)
East Harlem	Provision for expansion to the Bronx						
East Harlem	Disabled access	116th Street	116th Street & 2nd Avenue	2		September 2032 (under construction)	M15 SBS (southbound only); Would be located in unused tunnel between 115th to 120th Streets
East Harlem	Disabled access	106th Street	106th Street & 2nd Avenue	2		September 2032 (under construction)	M15 SBS (southbound only)
Upper East Side (Yorkville)	Disabled access	96th Street	94th–96th Streets & 2nd Avenue	1	N Q R	January 1, 2017	M15 SBS (southbound only); Northern terminal for Q trains (and limited N and R trains) in Phase 1
Upper East Side (Yorkville)	Disabled access	86th Street	83rd–86th Streets & 2nd Avenue	1	N Q R	January 1, 2017	M15 SBS (southbound only), M86 SBS
Upper East Side (Lenox Hill)	Disabled access	72nd Street	69th–72nd Streets & 2nd Avenue	1	N Q R	January 1, 2017	M15 SBS (southbound only)
Upper East Side (Lenox Hill)	N Q R trains split to/from BMT Broadway Line via BMT 63rd Street Line (Phase 1)						
East Midtown	T train continues down Second Avenue (Phase 3)						
East Midtown	Disabled access	55th Street	55th Street & 2nd Avenue	3		(proposed)	4 6 <6> E F <F> trains via proposed transfer at Lexington Avenue/51st Street (Note: Transfers are "under evaluation" and have not been confirmed yet.); M15 SBS (southbound only)
Turtle Bay	Disabled access	42nd Street	42nd Street & 2nd Avenue	3		(proposed)	4 5 6 <6> 7 <7> S trains via proposed transfer at Grand Central–42nd Street; Metro-North Railroad at Grand Central Terminal; Long Island Rail Road at Grand Central Madison; M15 SBS (southbound only)
Murray Hill	Disabled access	34th Street	34th Street & 2nd Avenue	3		(proposed)	M15 SBS (southbound only), M34 & M34A SBS to East River Ferry
Kips Bay	Disabled access	23rd Street	23rd Street & 2nd Avenue	3		(proposed)	M15 SBS (southbound only), M23 SBS
East Village	Disabled access	14th Street	14th Street & 2nd Avenue	3		(proposed)	L train via proposed transfer at Third Avenue; M15 SBS (southbound only)
East Village	Disabled access	Houston Street	Houston–3rd Streets & 2nd Avenue	3		(proposed)	F <F> trains via proposed transfer at Second Avenue; M15 (southbound only); Southern terminal for T train (Phase 3)
Chinatown	Disabled access	Grand Street	Grand & Chrystie Streets	4		(proposed)	B D trains via transfer at Grand Street
Chinatown	Disabled access	Chatham Square	East Broadway & Bowery	4		(proposed)	at Worth Street
Financial District	Disabled access	Seaport	Fulton & Water Streets	4		(proposed)	M15 SBS (at Fulton Street)
Financial District	Disabled access	Hanover Square	William & Water Streets	4		(proposed)	M15 SBS (at Old Slip); Southern terminal for T train (Phase 4)
Provision for expansion to Brooklyn

== See also ==
- Fulton Center
- Lower Manhattan–Jamaica/JFK Transportation Project
- Transportation in New York City
