= Romania–United States relations =

- Romania: United States

Diplomatic mission
- Embassy of Romania, Washington, D.C.: Embassy of the United States, Bucharest

Relations between Romania and the United States were formally established in 1880, with the appointment of Eugene Schuyler, a renowned and talented diplomat and historian, as the first American diplomatic representative to Romania. After Romania left the Eastern Bloc in 1989, US-Romanian relations have matured into a strategic partnership that encompasses a wide range of political, military, economic and cultural issues. The US supported Romania's entry into NATO, setting the stage for further integration into Europe. Today, Romania is a strong ally of the United States, and the two countries work together to build democracy, fight terrorism, and promote regional security and stability. United States is Observer bureau of the BSEC and both countries are Observer bureau of the CBSS.

In addition to close historical and cultural ties, Romania is one of the most consistently pro-American nations in Europe and in the world. According to a 2018 European poll, 78% of Romanians view the United States favorably. This is the second-highest pro-American sentiment in the EU, after Poland. Another poll showed that a very large percentage of Romanians, 87%, want future US ambassadors to Bucharest to continue supporting the fight against corruption in Romania. The same poll showed that 74% of Romanians want the United States to remain the main strategic partner of Romania.

== History ==
=== Early history ===
The earliest contacts between the two countries date to the 1830s when James Buchanan sought to create new trading routes on the Danube and in the Black Sea. In 1839, the American consul to Constantinople urged the Department of State to form consular offices in the Danubian Principalities with the role of increasing trade in the Danube harbors. Though not approved by the Department of State, the first consulate of the United States in the Principalities was established in Galați in 1844. The first career consul to Galați was appointed by President Buchanan in 1858 and was approved by Domnitor Alexandru Ioan Cuza a year later, on 10 November 1859. Other consulates were opened in Ismail, Brăila, and Iași, with the first consulate of Bucharest opening in 1864. The United States openly backed Romania during its War of Independence and recognized its independence on 14 October 1878, in a letter written by President Rutherford B. Hayes and delivered to Bucharest by the American consul to Galați.

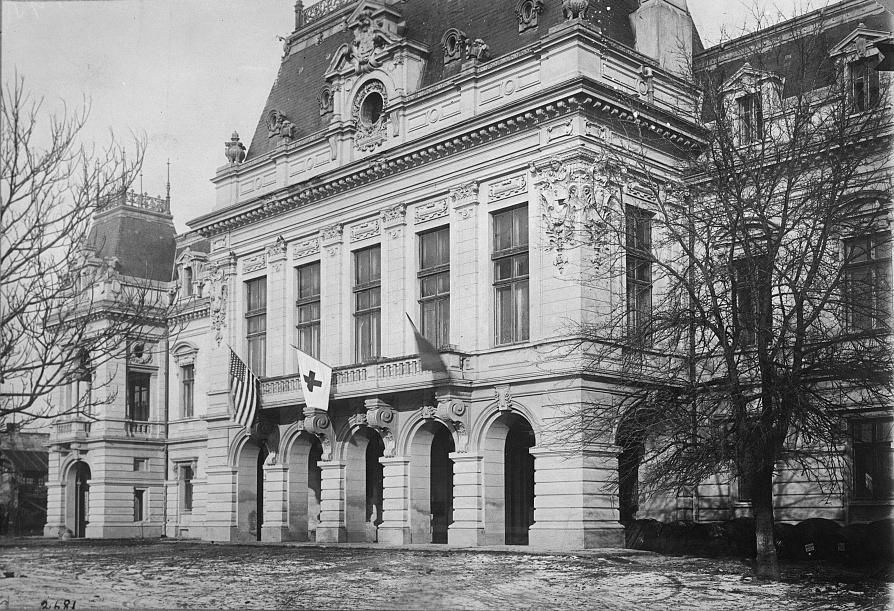
The American Hospital at the Roznovanu Palace in Iași, 1918

The official diplomatic relations between Romania and the United States started in 1880 when Eugene Schuyler was appointed as diplomatic agent and consul general of the United States of America to Romania. This was followed by the official recognition of the new Kingdom of Romania on 7 April 1881. Before World War I, the Romanian imports to America were declared subject to the "most favored nation" clause in an executive order issued by President William Howard Taft. A similar act was endorsed by the Romanian authorities in 1912. Although American support for Romania during the war was limited, an American Red Cross mission was sent to the country to provide humanitarian aid starting in 1917. In 1918, Romania's situation was also addressed by President Woodrow Wilson in his Fourteen Points, where it was demanded that the occupying Central Powers armies should evacuate the country. Wilson's support for self-determination also helped in establishing the eventual union with Transylvania.

In the United States, Romanians had also volunteered to join the US Army in fighting on the Western Front. Although the Romanian volunteer unit could not be established before the end of the war, the attempt strengthened the relationship between the two countries. Furthermore, the initiative succeeded in increasing the Romanian enlistments in the army, with 3,200–3,500 Romanians ending up serving in various American units in France, while some volunteers from Youngstown, Ohio managed to form a company size unit – the 112th Trench Mortar Battery.

=== Interwar period ===
Following the end of the Great War, the relations between Romania and the United States continued to increase. In 1921, Peter Augustus Jay was appointed as the first minister plenipotentiary to Romania. The cultural relations between the two countries also improved with publicized conference tours of important cultural figures taking place, while the number of Romanian students in top American universities increased as well. On the economic level, American companies continued to invest in Romania such as the Ford Motor Company opening an assembly plant in the country, and the "Româno-Americana" Society under Standard Oil of New Jersey expanding its operations.

=== World War II ===
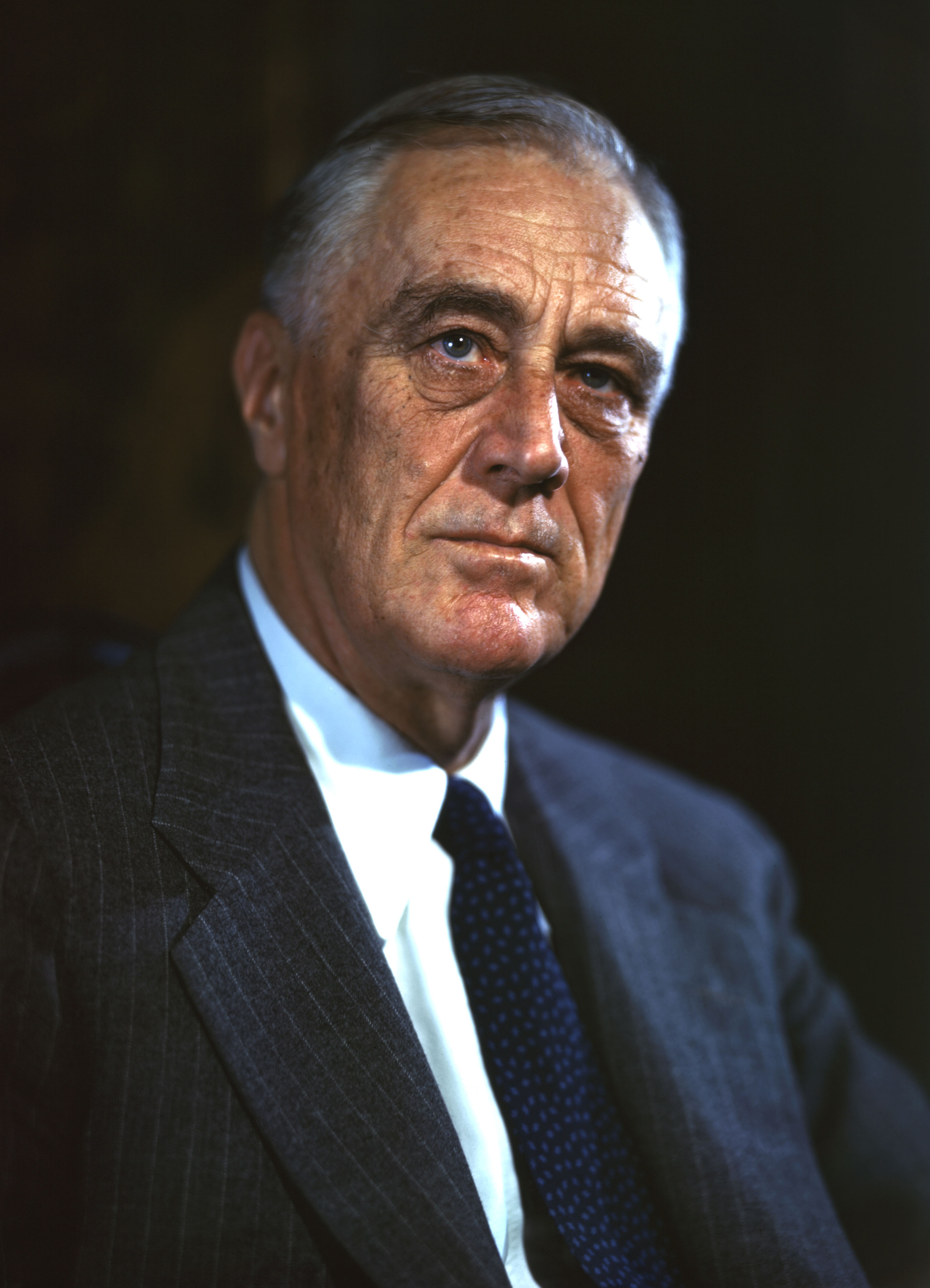
Franklin D. Roosevelt,
US president from 1933 to 1945

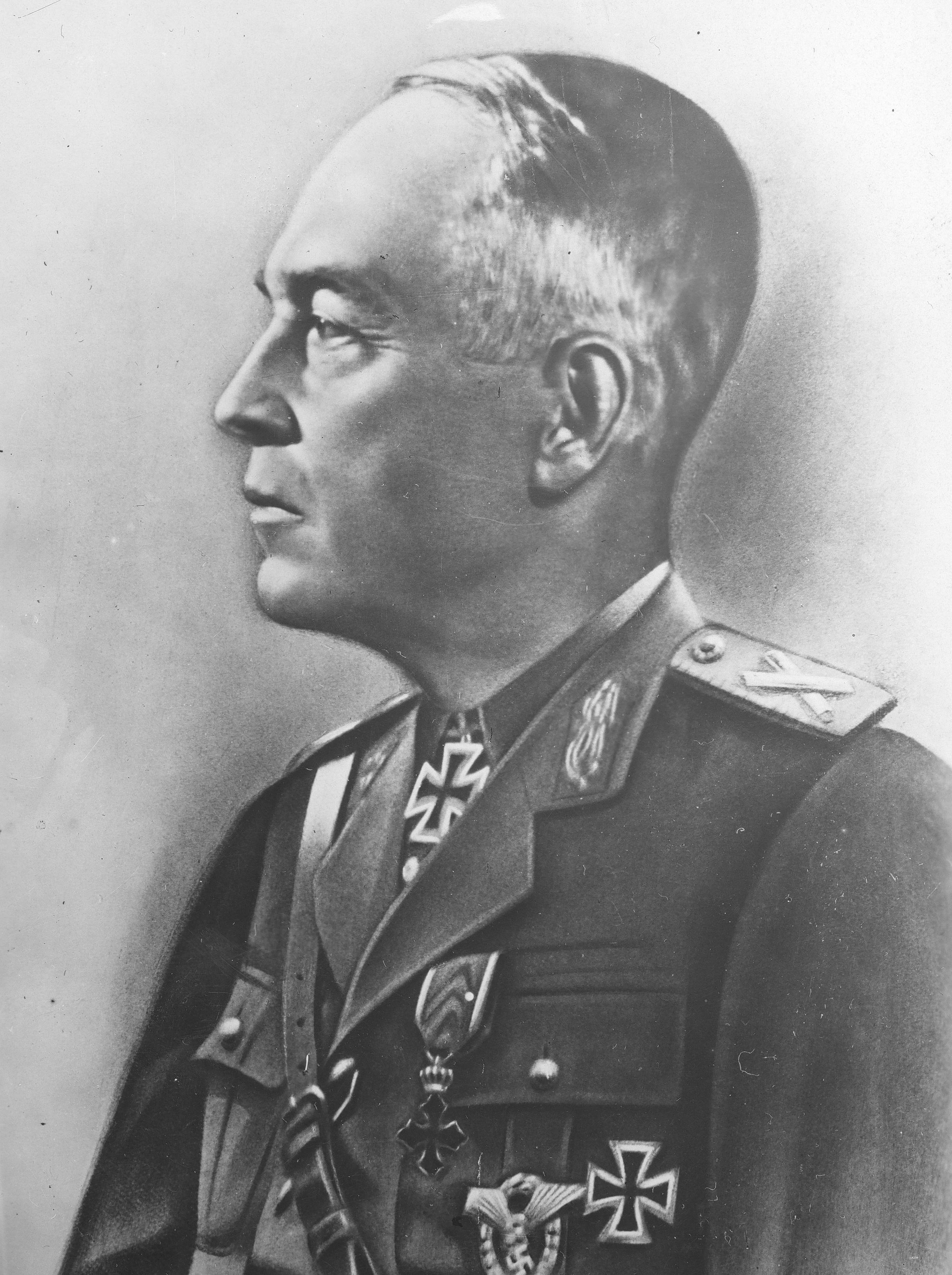
Ion Antonescu,
Conducător of Romania from 1940 to 1944

On 5 June 1942, in the midst of World War II, the United States declared war on Axis-aligned Romania, in response to Romania having declared war on the United States on December 12 of the previous year. The US declared war on Hungary and Bulgaria the same day. The declaration of war passed both houses of Congress unanimously, by votes of 361–0 in the House of Representatives and 73–0 in the Senate.

After the war declaration, the United States led a bombing campaign over the country which aimed to knock out Romania's oil exports to Nazi Germany. The most notable raid of this campaign was the low-level raid on Ploiești, code-named Operation Tidal Wave, on 1 August 1943, which saw the loss of over 50 B-24 Liberator bombers. In the aftermath of the raids, oil transports to Germany were severely affected although Romania's oil production failed to be destroyed. Allied casualties amounted to 1,500 POW and 1,706 KIA. After Romania changed sides in 1944, the American prisoners were repatriated during Operation Reunion.

=== Cold War ===
Socialist Republic of Romania–United States relations

- Romania: United States

Diplomatic mission
- Embassy of Romania, Washington, D.C.: Embassy of the United States, Bucharest

Relations remained strained during the Cold War while Romania was under communist influence. Bilateral relations began to improve in the early 1960s with the signing of an agreement providing for partial settlement of American property claims. Cultural, scientific, and educational exchanges were initiated, and in 1964 the legations of both nations were promoted to full embassies.

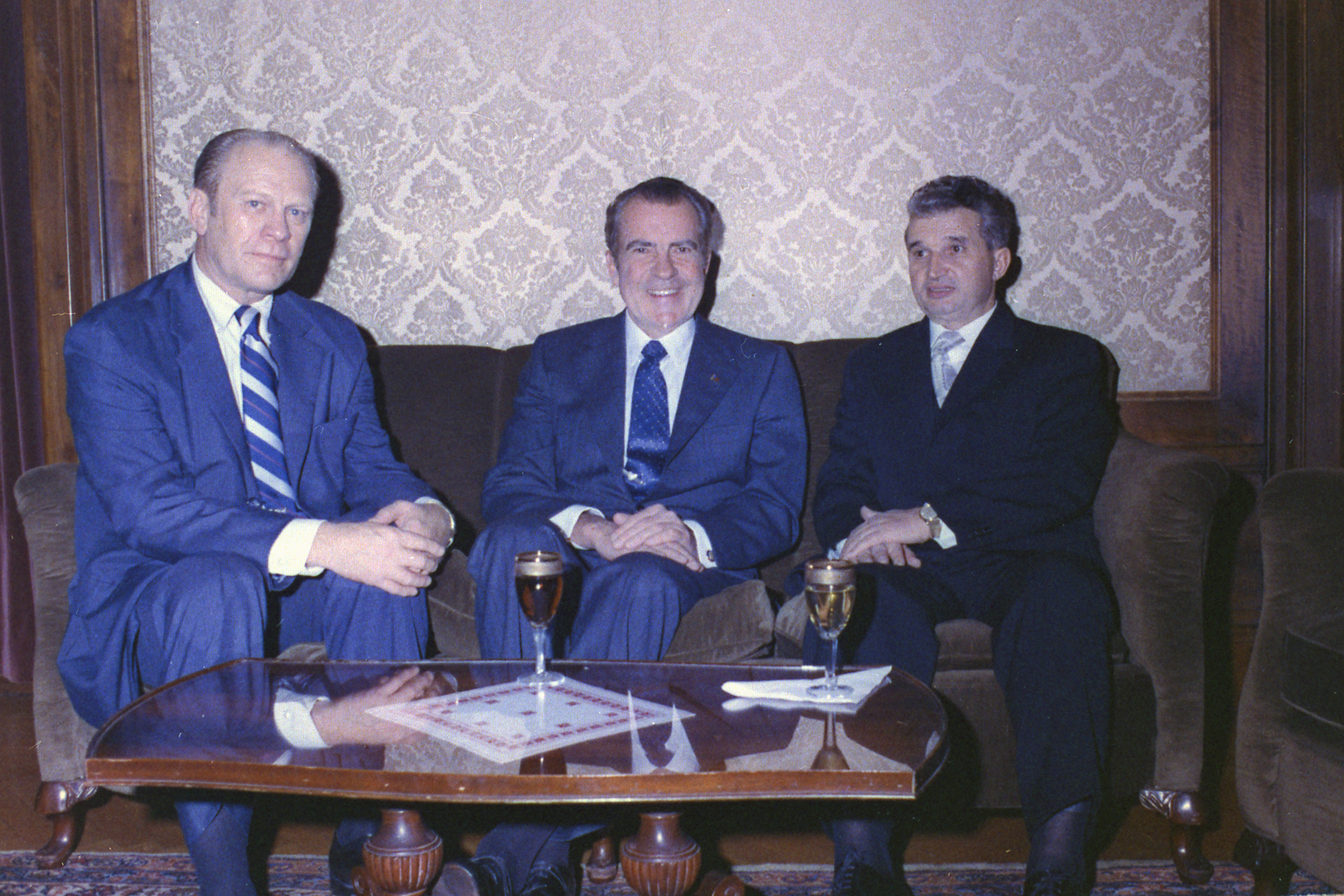
Gerald Ford, Richard Nixon and Nicolae Ceaușescu in 1973

After Communist Party general secretary Nicolae Ceaușescu began to distance Romania from Soviet foreign policy, as in Romania's continued diplomatic relations with Israel and denunciation of the 1968 invasion of Czechoslovakia, President Richard Nixon paid an official visit to Romania in August 1969. Despite political differences, diplomacy continued between US and Romanian leaders throughout the 1970s, culminating in the 1978 state visit to Washington by President Ceaușescu and his wife Elena.

In 1972, a consular convention to facilitate the protection of citizens and their property in both countries was signed. Overseas Private Investment Corporation (OPIC) facilities were granted, and Romania became eligible for US Export-Import Bank credits.

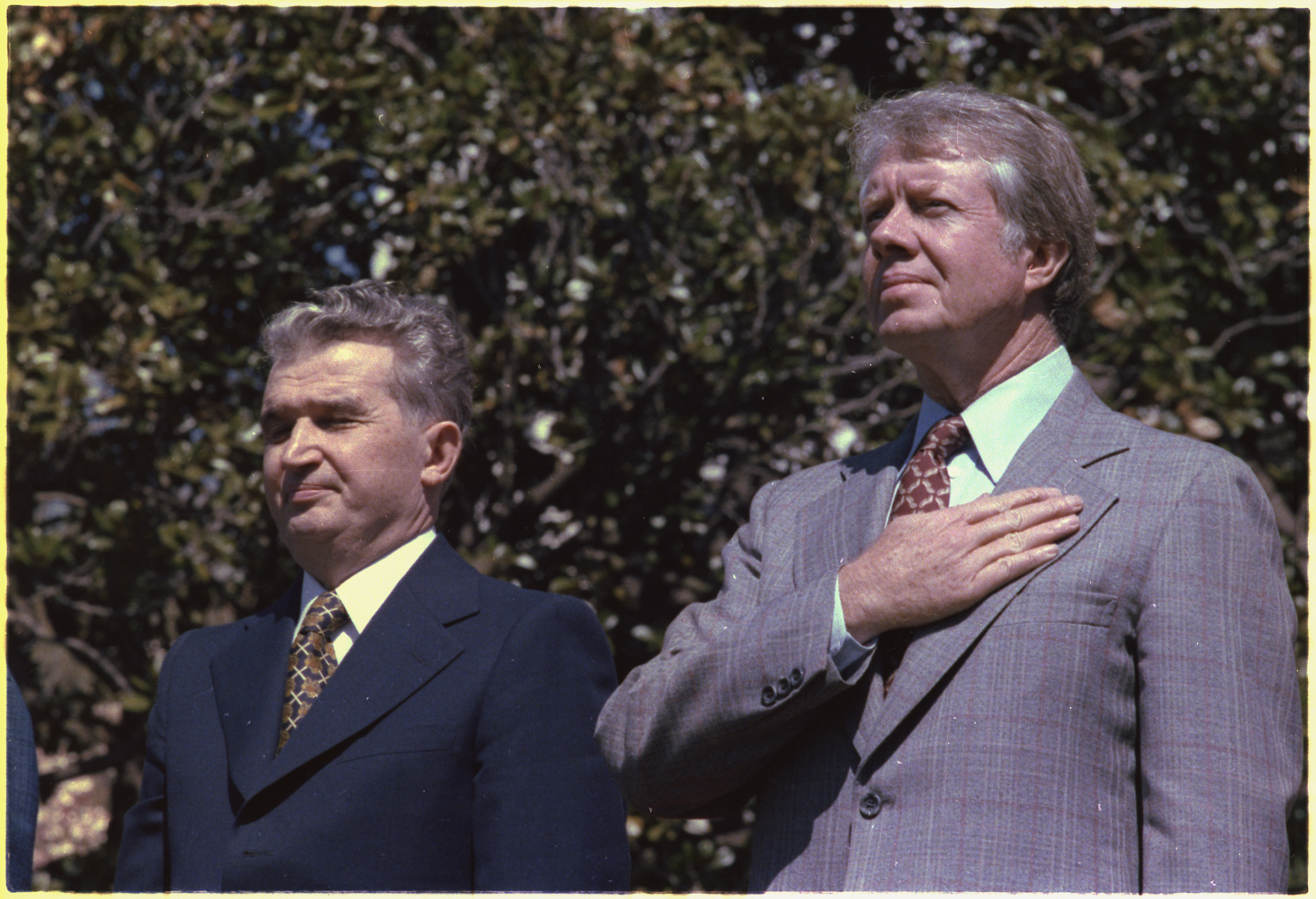
Ceaușescu with Jimmy Carter, 12 April 1978

A trade agreement signed in April 1975 accorded most favored nation (MFN) status to Romania under section 402 of the Trade Reform Act of 1974 (the Jackson-Vanik amendment that links MFN to a country's performance on emigration). This status was renewed yearly after a congressional review confirmed a presidential determination that stated Romania was making progress toward freedom of emigration. In 1984, Romania became the only Warsaw Pact country to ignore the Soviet demands and participate in the Olympic Games held in Los Angeles that year.

In the mid-1980s, criticism of Romania's deteriorating human rights record, particularly regarding the mistreatment of religious and ethnic minorities, spurred attempts by Congress to withdraw MFN status. In 1988, to preempt congressional action, Ceaușescu renounced MFN treatment, calling Jackson-Vanik and other human rights requirements unacceptable interference in Romanian sovereignty.

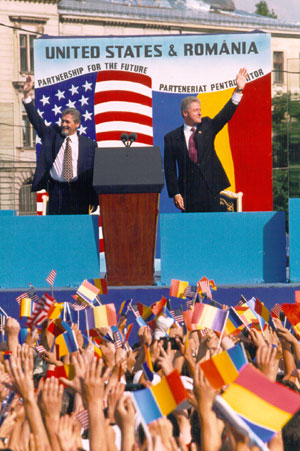
Emil Constantinescu and Bill Clinton in Bucharest on 11 July 1997. During the visit Clinton declared Romania "free of communism".

After welcoming the revolution of December 1989 with a visit by Secretary of State Baker in February 1990, the US Government expressed concern that opposition parties had faced discriminatory treatment in the May 1990 elections, in which the National Salvation Front won a sweeping victory. The slow progress of subsequent political and economic reform increased that concern, and relations with Romania declined sharply after the June 1990 Mineriad, where an anti-NSF sit-in was suppressed by Romanian police. Anxious to cultivate better relationships with the US and Europe, and disappointed at the poor results from its gradualist economic reform strategy, the Stolojan government implemented economic reform and conducted free and fair parliamentary and presidential elections in September 1992. Encouraged by the conduct of local elections in February 1992, US Deputy Secretary of State Lawrence Eagleburger visited in May 1992. Congress restored MFN in November 1993 in recognition of Romania's progress in instituting political and economic reform. In 1996, the US Congress voted to extend permanent MFN graduation to Romania.

=== Present relations ===
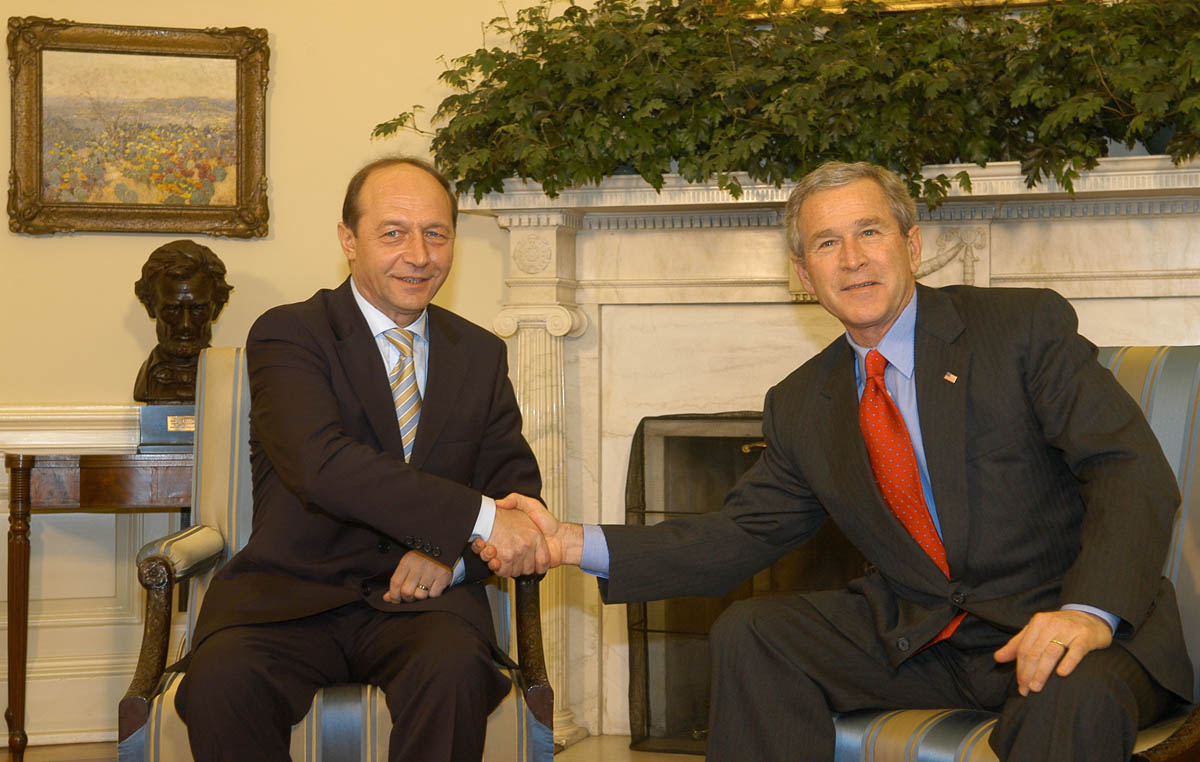
Romanian president Traian Băsescu with US president George W. Bush, 2005

As Romania's policies became unequivocally pro-Western, the United States moved to deepen relations. President Bill Clinton visited Bucharest in 1997. The two countries initiated cooperation on shared goals, including economic and political development, defense reform, and non-traditional threats (such as trans-border crime and non-proliferation).

Following the attacks of 11 September 2001, Romania was fully supportive of the US in the global war on terror. Romania was part of the American-led "Coalition of the Willing" that supported the invasion of Iraq in 2003. Romania was invited to join the North Atlantic Treaty Organization (NATO) in November 2002 and formally joined NATO on 29 March 2004, after depositing its instruments of treaty ratification in Washington, D.C. President George W. Bush helped commemorate Romania's NATO accession when he visited Bucharest in November 2002. On that occasion, he congratulated the Romanian people on building democratic institutions and a market economy after the fall of communism. Romanian troops served alongside US troops in Afghanistan and were among the last to withdraw from Iraq.

In March 2005, President Traian Băsescu made his first official visit to Washington to meet with President Bush, Secretary of State Condoleezza Rice, Secretary of Defense Donald Rumsfeld, and other senior US officials. In December 2005, Secretary Rice visited Bucharest to meet with President Băsescu and to sign a bilateral defense cooperation agreement that would allow for the joint use of Romanian military facilities by US troops. The first proof of principle exercise took place at Mihail Kogălniceanu Air Base from August to October 2007.

Romania formally terminated its mission in Iraq on 4 June 2009, and pulled out its troops. On 23 July, the last Romanian soldiers left Iraq. Three Romanian soldiers had been killed during their mission, and at least eight were wounded.

In 2011, the United States and Romania issued the "Joint Declaration on Strategic Partnership for the 21st Century Between the United States of America and Romania." The two countries identified key areas for enhanced cooperation, focusing on their political-military relationship, law-enforcement cooperation, trade and investment opportunities, and energy security. The United States and Romania are mutually committed to supporting human rights, strengthening the rule of law, and increasing prosperity in both countries. Romania and the United States also have ties in the form of business, arts and academic programs, including the Future Leaders Exchange (FLEX) for high school students and a Fulbright Program managed by the bilateral Fulbright Commission. Romania's promotion of greater cooperation among its Black Sea neighbors in the areas of defense, law enforcement, energy, economic development, and the environment complements the US goal of enhancing stability in this sensitive and vital region.

In October 2013, the Romanian Government allowed the United States military to use the Mihail Kogălniceanu Air Base for US troop withdrawal from Afghanistan after the closure of the Transit Center at Manas.

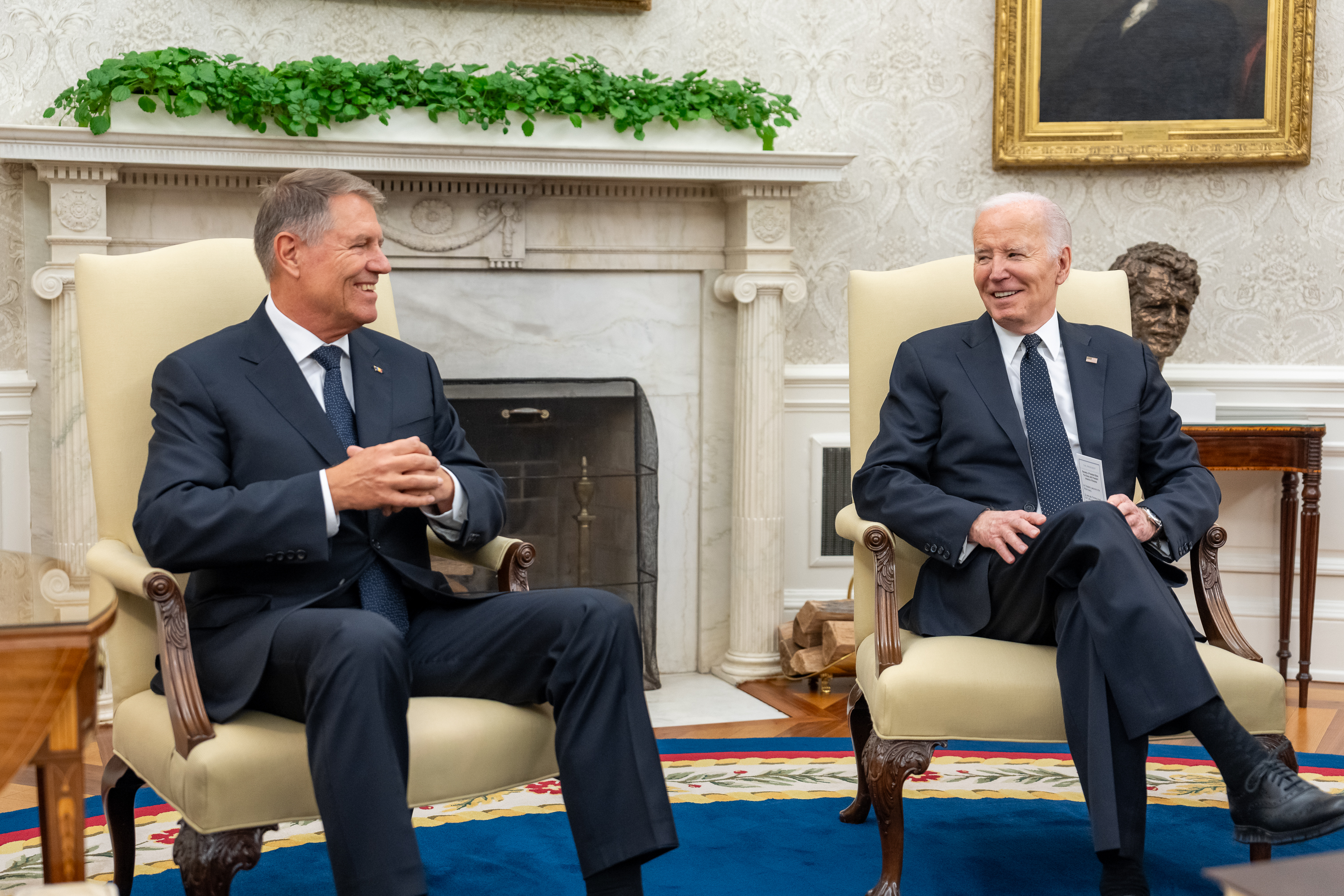
Romanian president Klaus Iohannis with American president Joe Biden, 2024

In 2024, the US Government informed its Romanian counterpart that the Romanian Armed Forces can access funds for the modernization programs through the Foreign Military Financing program. Under this program, the Romanian side can access up to 4 billion dollars in direct loans as well as up to 8 billion dollars attracted by contracting loans from the financial markets.

Romania joined the Visa Waiver Program in January 2025. At the 61st Munich Security Conference in February 2025, vice president JD Vance held a speech in which he criticised Romania for annulling the result of its 2024 presidential election following the surprise victory of Călin Georgescu in the first round.

Following the Iran war, Romania allowed United States to use the Mihail Kogălniceanu and Câmpia Turzii air bases to deploy refueling aircraft participating in the ongoing military operations in Iran.

== Economic relations ==
Following the 1989 revolution, Romania's economy began to transition from state control to capitalism. The country worked to create a legal framework consistent with a market economy and investment promotion. Romania became a member of the European Union in 2007. In 1992, the United States and Romania signed a bilateral investment treaty (BIT), which came into force in 1994. In 2003, before Romania's accession to the EU, the United States and Romania amended the BIT, which remains in effect. Romania attracts US investors interested in accessing the European market, with relatively low costs and a well-educated, tech-savvy population being major draws. In Romania, major US firms operate in the energy, manufacturing, information technology and telecommunications, services, and consumer products sectors. Top Romanian exports to the United States include machinery, vehicle parts, steel, and metallic items, and fertilizers.

== Resident diplomatic missions ==
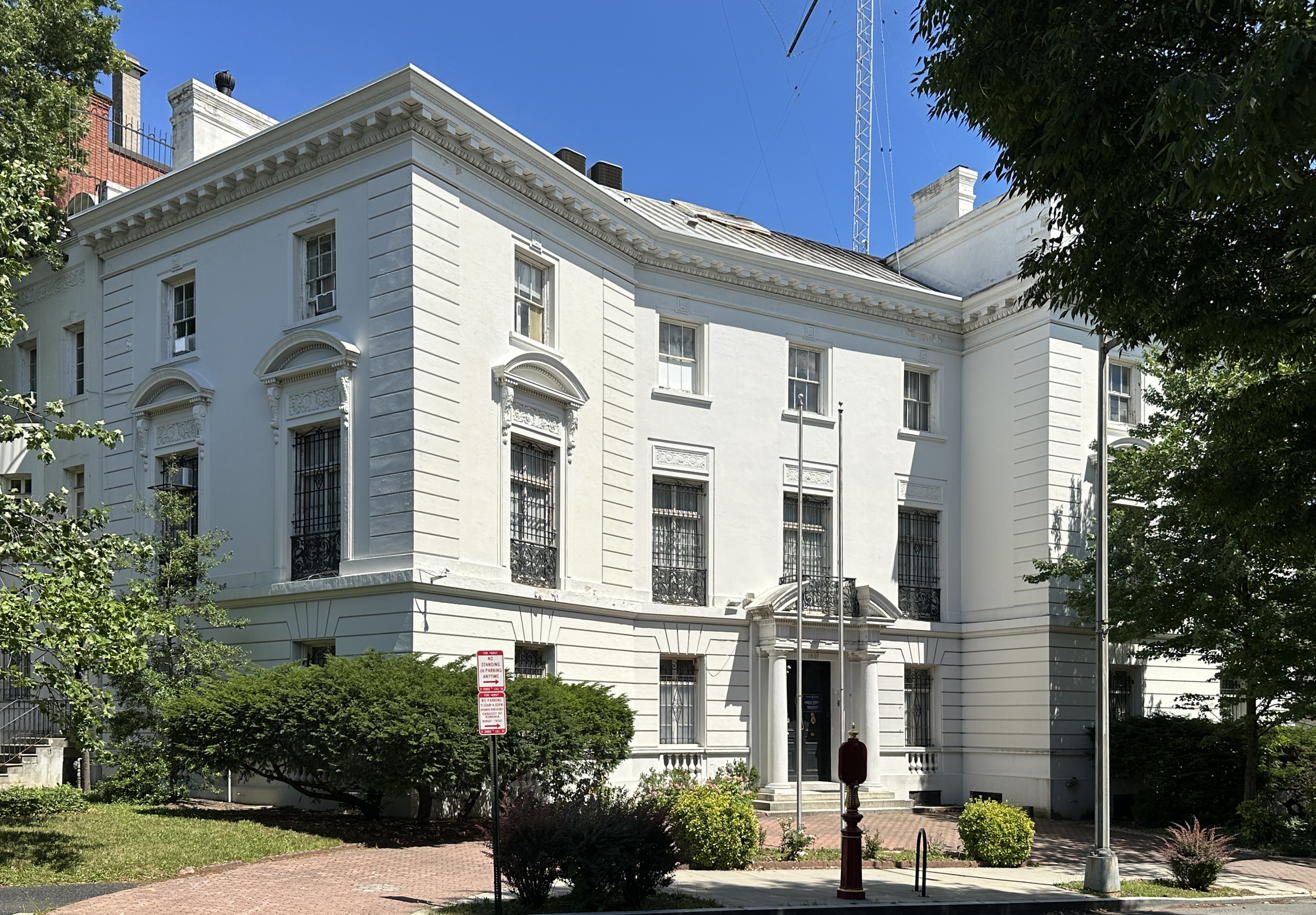
Embassy of Romania, Washington, D.C. seen in 2026

of Romania in the United States

- Embassy (1): Washington, D.C.
- Consulate General (5): Chicago, Los Angeles, New York City, Miami, Houston
- Honorary Consulate General (1): Atlanta
- Consulate Honorary (17): Boston, Cleveland, Dallas, Detroit, Hartford, Indianapolis, Las Vegas, Minneapolis, New Orleans, Norfolk, Norman, Philadelphia, Portland, Phoenix, Sarasota, San Francisco, Sacramento

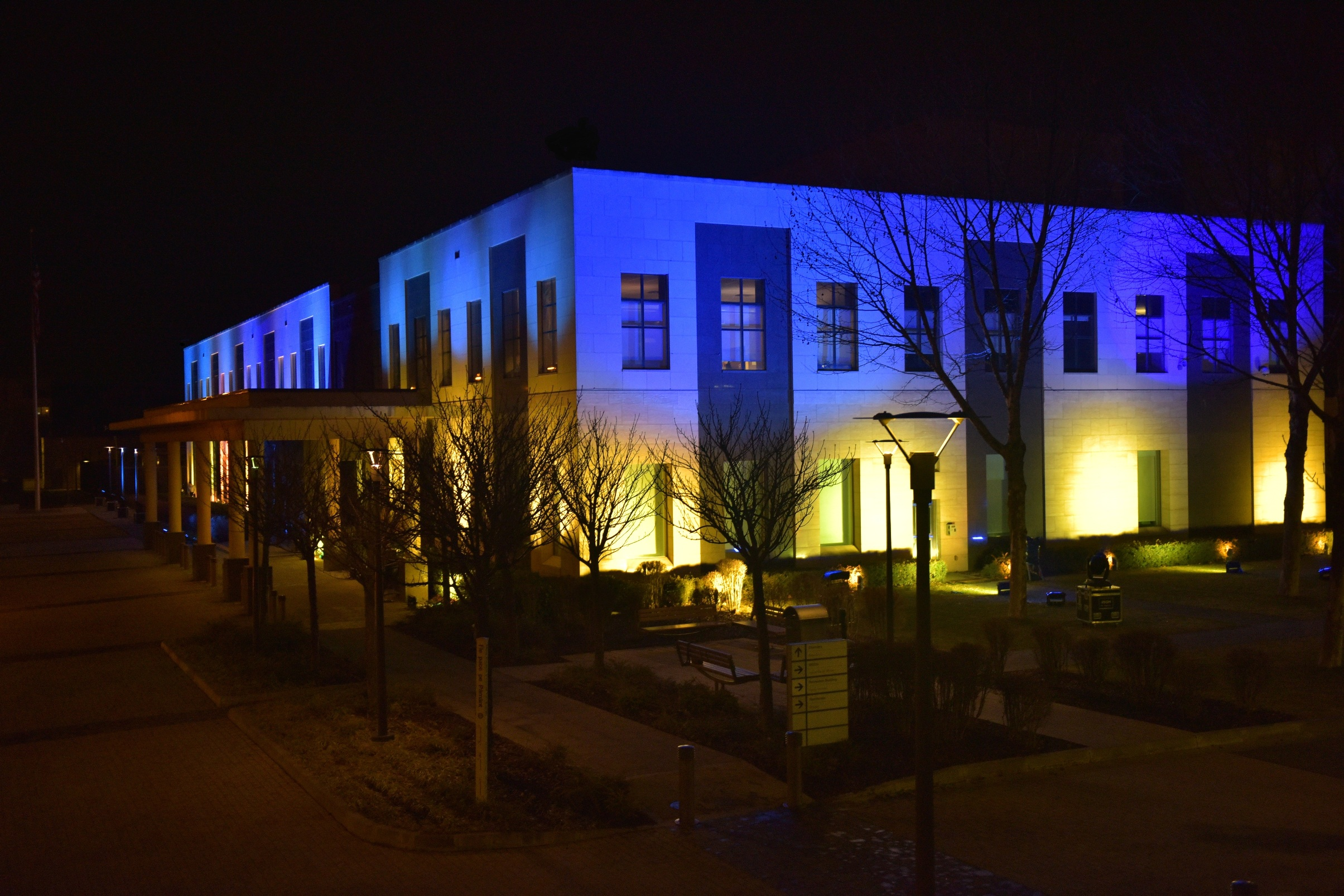
Embassy of the United States, Bucharest

of United States in Romania

- Embassy (1): Bucharest

== U.S military deployments to Romania ==
=== 99th Military Base Deveselu ===
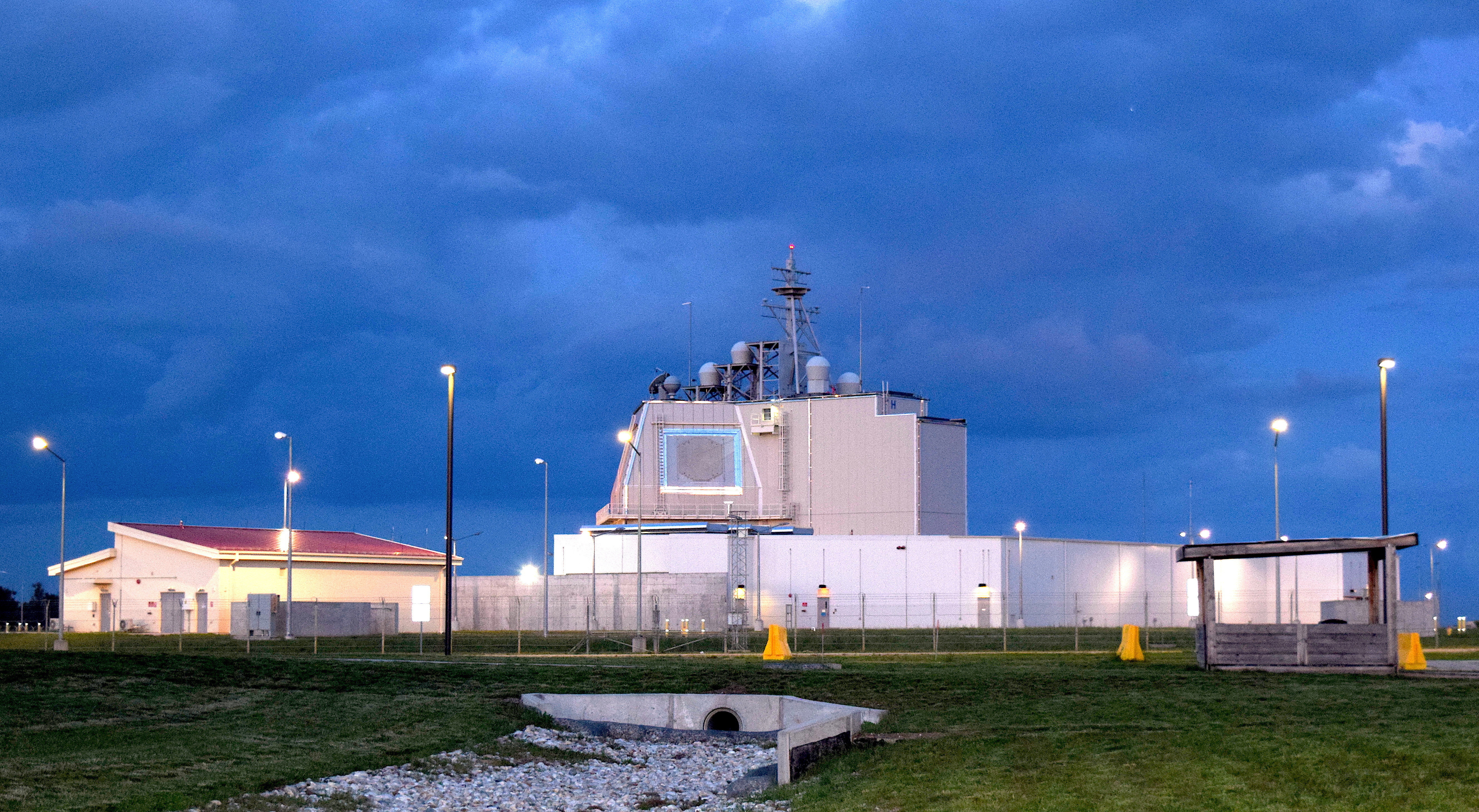
The Aegis Ashore Missile Defense Complex Romania

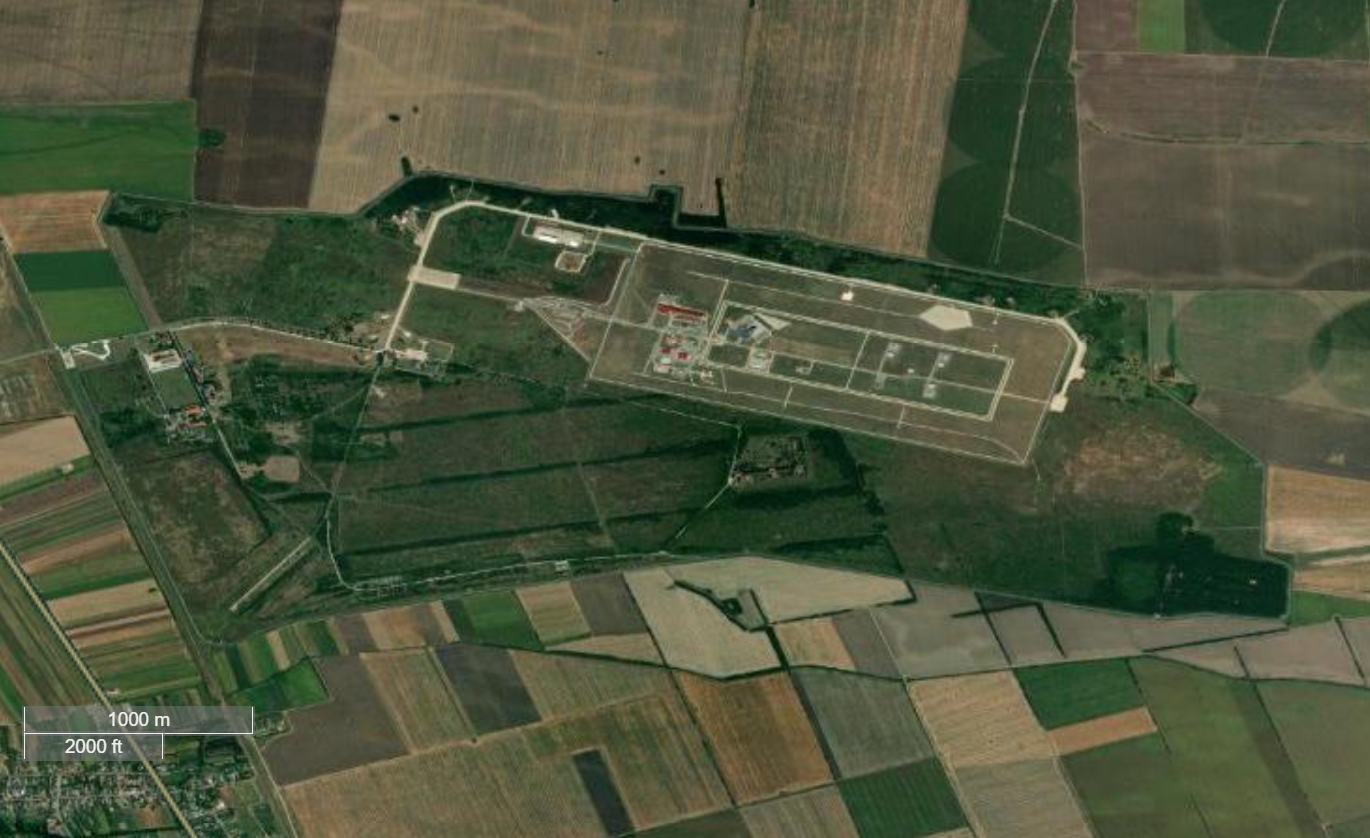
Satellite view of the base

The Romanian Air Force 91st Air Base was closed in 2003, forcing approximately 200 personnel into early retirement; about 15 still live in the commune in the "airmen neighborhood".

The airbase near Deveselu was selected for the NATO missile defense system employing Aegis Ashore Ballistic Missile Defense System and the inauguration ceremony was held in December 2015. The system uses the SM-3 Block I.B. interceptor. There are about 500 Romanian soldiers, 250 U.S. troops, and other personnel working at the base.

On 29 April 2022, a ceremony was held at the base with the occasion of the 10th anniversary of its establishment. On this occasion, the military colours of the 99th Military Base Deveselu were decorated with the Order of Military Virtue.

=== 57th Air Base Mihail Kogălniceanu ===
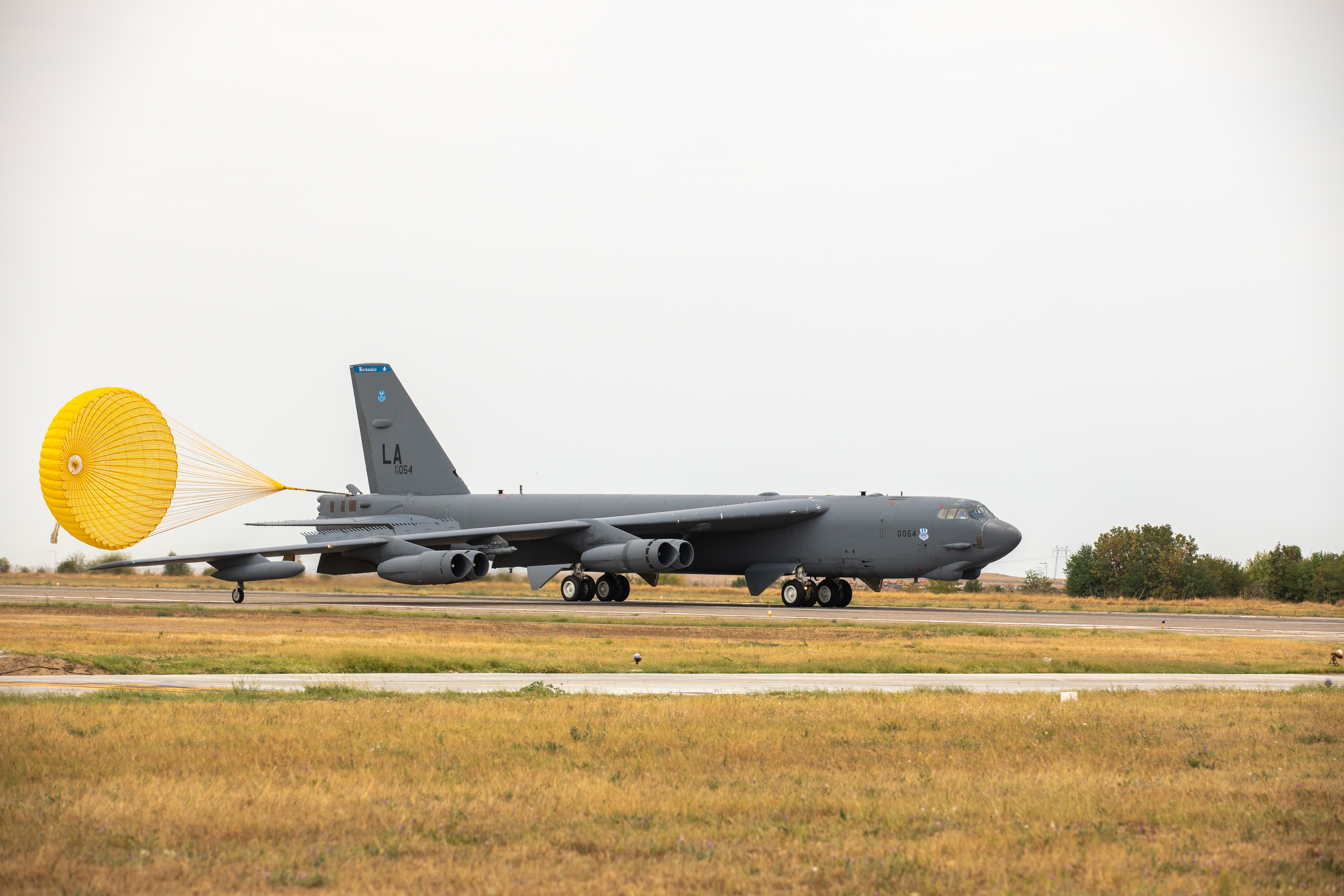
US Air Force B-52H Stratofortress taxis at Mihail Kogălniceanu Air Base

The base has been used by the US Military since 1999. In 2003, it became one of four Romanian military facilities that have been used by US military forces as a staging area for the invasion of and counter-insurgency efforts in Iraq, operated by the 458th Air Expeditionary Group. It was intended to become one of the main operating bases of United States Army Europe's Joint Task Force East (JTF-E), a rotating task force initially to be provided by the US 2nd Cavalry Regiment, which was to grow to a brigade-sized force eventually. The JTF-E concept was reduced to the Army-only Task Force East, but the base still retains an important role, given added weight by the annexation of Crimea by the Russian Federation. As of 2024, the base hosts over 4,500 American soldiers.

During the first three months of the 2003 invasion of Iraq, the airport was transited by 1,300 cargo and personnel transports towards Iraq, comprising 6,200 personnel and about 11,100 tons of equipment.

Starting in 2019, the United States Army has stationed units at the base on nine-month rotations. In 2022, elements of the 101st Airborne Division arrived at the base, an event which marked the first deployment of the 101st Division to Europe in nearly 80 years. As part of the Bomber Task Force mission, B-52 Stratofortress bombers operated from the base for the first time in 2024. Also in 2024, construction work began on expanding the base, which will become the largest NATO base in Europe, able to house over 10,000 American and NATO soldiers and civilians.

=== 71st Air Base Câmpia Turzii ===
The first United States Air Force use of the Câmpia Turzii Air Base happened in 2008 with the deployment of F-15E Strike Eagles in support of the air policing missions for the Bucharest Summit that happened in the same year. In 2021, the base began modernization with the help of the United States through the William M. (Mac) Thornberry National Defense Authorization Act for Fiscal Year 2021 part of the European Deterrence Initiative program. Further base upgrades were completed in 2023.

Since 2021, the US Air Force has also stationed MQ-9 Reaper drones at the base. The drones are operated by the 731st Expeditionary Attack Squadron.

== High-level mutual visits ==
Guest	Host	Place of visit	Date of visit
(Kingdom of Romania) Colonel Sergiu Voinescu	(United States) President Rutherford B. Hayes	Washington, D.C.	November 1880
(Kingdom of Romania) Queen Marie	(United States) President Calvin Coolidge	New York	1926
(Socialist Republic of Romania) Prime Minister Ion Gheorghe Maurer	(United States) President Lyndon B. Johnson	New York	26 June 1967
(United States) President Richard Nixon	(Socialist Republic of Romania) President Nicolae Ceaușescu	Bucharest	2–3 August 1969
(Romania) President Nicolae Ceaușescu	(United States) President Richard Nixon	White House, Washington, D.C.	24 October 1970
(Romania) President Nicolae Ceaușescu	(United States) President Richard Nixon	White House, Washington, DC, Wilmington, Cleveland, Hartford, and New York.	4–7 December 1973
(United States) President Gerald Ford	(Socialist Republic of Romania) President Nicolae Ceaușescu	Bucharest, Sinaia	2–3 August 1975
(Socialist Republic of Romania) President Nicolae Ceaușescu	(United States) President Jimmy Carter	White House, Washington, D.C., New York, Chattanooga, Dallas, Houston, and New Orleans	11–17 April 1978
(Romania) President Ion Iliescu	(United States) President Bill Clinton	White House, Washington, D.C.	19–23 April 1993
(Romania) President Ion Iliescu	(United States) President Bill Clinton	White House, Washington, D.C.	25–29 September 1995
(United States) President Bill Clinton	(Romania) President Emil Constantinescu (Romania) Prime Minister Victor Ciorbea	Bucharest	11 July 1997
(Romania) President Emil Constantinescu	(United States) President Bill Clinton	White House, Washington, D.C., Chicago, San Francisco	14–17 July 1998
(Romania) President Emil Constantinescu	(United States) President Bill Clinton	Washington, D.C.	23–25 April 1999
(Romania) Prime Minister Adrian Năstase	(United States) President George W. Bush	White House, Washington, D.C.	29 October – 1 November 2001
(United States) President George W. Bush	(Romania) President Ion Iliescu	Bucharest	23 November 2002
(Romania) Prime Minister Adrian Năstase	(United States) President George W. Bush	White House, Washington, D.C.	28–29 March 2004
(Romania) Prime Minister Adrian Năstase	(United States) President George W. Bush	White House, Washington, D.C.	18–21 July 2004
(Romania) President Traian Băsescu	(United States) President George W. Bush	White House, Washington, D.C.	8–9 March 2005
(Romania) President Traian Băsescu	(United States) President George W. Bush	White House, Washington, D.C.	26–28 July 2006
(United States) President George W. Bush	(Romania) President Traian Băsescu	Bucharest	2–4 April 2008
(United States) Vice President Joe Biden	(Romania) President Traian Băsescu	Bucharest	22 October 2009
(Romania) President Traian Băsescu	(United States) President Barack Obama	McCormick Place, Chicago	20–21 May 2012
(Romania) President Klaus Iohannis	(United States) President Barack Obama	White House, Washington, D.C.	31 March – 1 April 2016
(Romania) President Klaus Iohannis	(United States) President Donald Trump	White House, Washington, D.C.	9 June 2017
(Romania) President Klaus Iohannis	(United States) President Donald Trump	White House, Washington, D.C.	20 August 2019
(United States) Vice President Kamala Harris	(Romania) President Klaus Iohannis	Bucharest	11 March 2022
(Romania) President Klaus Iohannis	(United States) President Joe Biden	White House, Washington, D.C.	7 May 2024
(Romania) President Klaus Iohannis	(United States) President Joe Biden	Walter E. Washington Convention Center, Washington, D.C.	9–11 July 2024

== See also ==
- Foreign relations of Romania
- Foreign relations of the United States
- List of Romanian ambassadors to the United States
- Romanian Americans
- Romanian-American organizations
- Romanian-American University
- Alabama–Romania National Guard Partnership
- Vin americanii!
