= Alabama–Romania National Guard Partnership =

Alabama–Romania State Partnership
- Part of the U.S. European Command State Partnership Program
- Origin: 1993
- Country president: Nicușor Dan
- Prime minister: Ilie Bolojan
- Minister of defense: Radu Miruță
- Ambassador to U.S.: Andrei Muraru
- Ambassador to Romania: Darryl Nirenberg
- State Governor: Kay Ivey
- Adjutant general: MG Sheryl Gordon
- 2012 Engagements: 6
- NATO member: Yes (2004)
- EU member: Yes (2007)

Romania

The Alabama–Romania National Guard Partnership is one of 25 European partnerships that make up the U.S. European Command State Partnership Program and one of 88 worldwide partnerships that make-up the National Guard State Partnership Program. Romania signed a bilateral affairs agreement with the U.S. Department of Defense and the state of Alabama in July 1993 establishing the Alabama–Romania State Partnership Program. Since then, the ALNG has fostered a solid relationship and continues to be a viable enabler in building capacity in Romania.

The Alabama National Guard, which became one of the first states to participate in the SPP, has witnessed the fruits of its enduring relationship with the Romanian military. Army Maj. Gen. Perry G. Smith, former Alabama Adjutant General, said his soldiers and airmen have taught the Romanians skills acquired during combat deployments and as well as those learned by responding to Hurricane Katrina and other disasters at home. Smith noted that on one day in April 2011, the state suffered 58 tornadoes, requiring him to activate 3,000 National Guardsmen to assist in response efforts. This has given the Alabama Guard solid experience to share with the Romanian military, Smith said, including its processes for providing defense support to civilian authorities and the courses-of-action development process the military uses to present commanders with decision-making options. The two countries' special operators, military police, infantry and logistics elements work together through the program.

The ALNG has conducted over 140 engagements since partnership inception. Engagements have focused on NATO interoperability, promoting political stability, assisting in the development of democratic institutions and open market economies, demonstrating military subordination and support to civil authorities, projecting U.S. humanitarian values and providing support to deploying troops in support of the current war fight.

== History ==
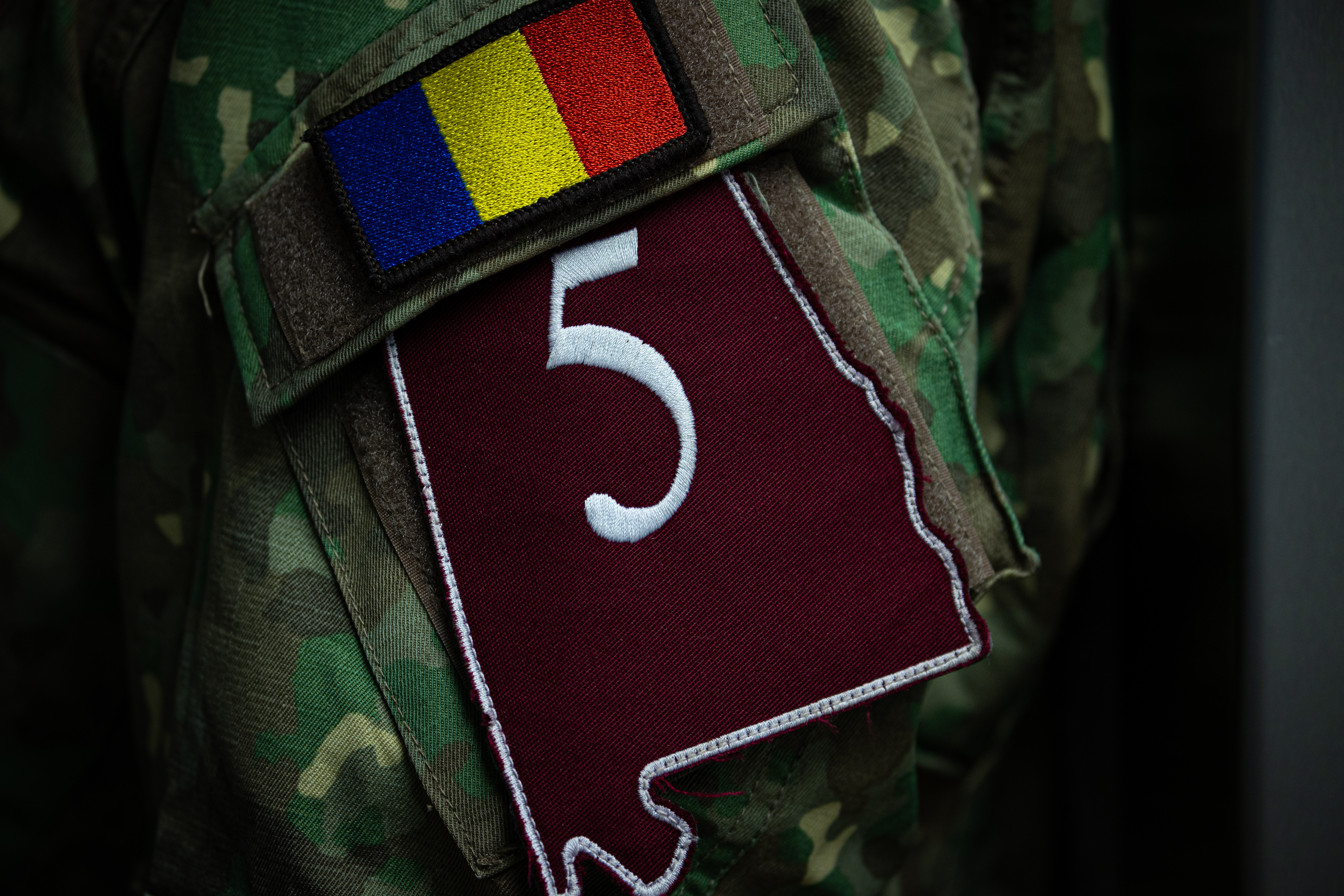
Patch worn by a Romanian soldier during the Best Warrior 2023 competition hosted by the Alabama National Guard

"It's all about relationships. As National Guard members get on the ground and start working with the Romanians, they develop life-long relationships. And people can get things done a lot better if they know and trust each other." - MG Perry Smith, Former Adjutant General, Alabama National Guard

- State Partnership was established 14 JUL 93.
- NATO Partner 29 MAR 04, EU membership JAN 07, and a UN member.
- Romania continues to work through economic and political reforms.
- Romania's middle class continues to grow.
- Armed Forces consist of land, air, and naval forces.
- The Alabama National Guard has participated in humanitarian missions to provide glasses, medical and dental examinations to the Romanian people.
- Continued participation in JTF East.
- Military to civilian events have expanded. Focus is on disaster response and security assistance.
- In 2009, the state conducted a security assistance visit to discuss future Military to Civilian participation with Romania.
- Focus for Military to Military events include unit level training events with encompasses medical and logistical plans training, military police operations, and special operations familiarization.

The Alabama-Romania SPP began with familiarization events designed to introduce the Romanian Ministries of National Defense and Interior to Alabama National Guard exercise methods and procedures and has evolved to include in and out of country events contributing to what is now one of the United States European Command's (EUCOM) most strategic bilateral relationships. The program began to develop through the use of traveling contact team (in country events), familiarizations (out of country events), orientations and exercises and the partnership with the Alabama National Guard met its primary end state when Romania became a member of the North Atlantic Treaty Organization (NATO) in 2004.

The Partnership continues to develop Romanian military capabilities and improve Romania's ability to partner with the United States and NATO in global peacekeeping operations and the War on Terrorism utilizing skills enhanced by the Alabama National Guard, the U.S. Army, Navy, Air Force and Marine Corps and in accordance with the guidelines set forth in U.S. EUCOM's Country Campaign Plan and the U.S. Ambassador's Mission Strategic Resource Plan. The focus of the partnership centers on the continued effective and efficient execution of familiarizations and demonstrations of U.S. and NATO techniques through the use of events conducted by teams traveling into Romania and through visits and joint activities in the United States, Europe, and Africa.

In 2012, EUCOM funded 64 events in support of further developing Romania's military and disaster response capabilities; of these 9 were conducted directly by the Alabama National Guard in addition to one Flight Deployment by the 187th Fighter Wing from Alabama's Air National Guard, an event that was instrumental in Romania's decision to purchase F-16 aircraft over other multi-role air frames. For 2013 Alabama National Guard has been specifically asked by the Romanian Ministry of Defense to conduct 10 out of over 80 events proposed events for the fiscal year.

At this time events conducted to develop Romania's military capabilities have led to their contribution of maintaining two full battalions of soldiers in Afghanistan in addition to supporting efforts in Iraq while efforts were focused there and peacekeeping efforts in Kosovo. As we prepare for a drawdown in Afghanistan exercises and both in and out of country events continue to prepare troops scheduled to deploy, but also focus on developing programs to ensure that experienced soldiers maintain the skills obtained from their down-range deployments and pass those lessons learned on to upcoming soldiers or other pre-deployment units.

The Alabama National Guard has also had the opportunity to contribute to Romania from a humanitarian standpoint, as volunteers donated assets to support two different orphanages with clothing, bedding, and exercise equipment for use in rehabilitation of children with disabilities. Alabama's efforts resulted in Humanitarian Assistance to these facilities, which subsequently encouraged local donations. As FY 12 began to come to a close Alabama National Guard had the opportunity to share its expertise in the area of disaster response when asked to participate as observers in an engineering exercise that focused on the construction of its levies for flood control and how to manage the consequences of a failure in this system.

In 2012, Soldiers from Alabama and Romania participated in six joint events, including military police operations, range control operations, medical operations, and Tisa River disaster response. In addition, then Romanian Chief of General Staff, Lieutenant General Stefan Danila, made an official visit to Alabama in September 2012. During this visit, Danila spoke with MG Perry Smith, then Adjutant General of the Alabama Army and Air National Guard, on the future of cooperation between Romania and Alabama. The Romanian delegation visited two air bases and the Training Center of the Alabama Air National Guard.

In 2013, the Alabama National Guard assisted the Romanian military with the development of such important functions as family readiness groups and post deployment activities, to include development of briefs by counselors and military chaplains as well as develop relationships between Alabama units and Romanian units in order to ensure effective continuity of the level of demonstration conducted between these "sister" units in subsequent FY events as the relationships mature.

== Partnership focus ==
The focus for 2013:

- Host-Nation Support
- Reception, Staging, Orientation, and Integration
- Chemical-Biological-Radiological-Nuclear-Environmental
- Disaster Response
- Cyber Security

The focus for 2014:

- Host-Nation Support
- Reception, Staging, Orientation, and Integration
- Chemical-Biological-Radiological-Nuclear-Environmental
- Disaster Response
- Joint Tactical Air Control
- Air Force & base development
- Contingency Operation Support

== Gallery ==
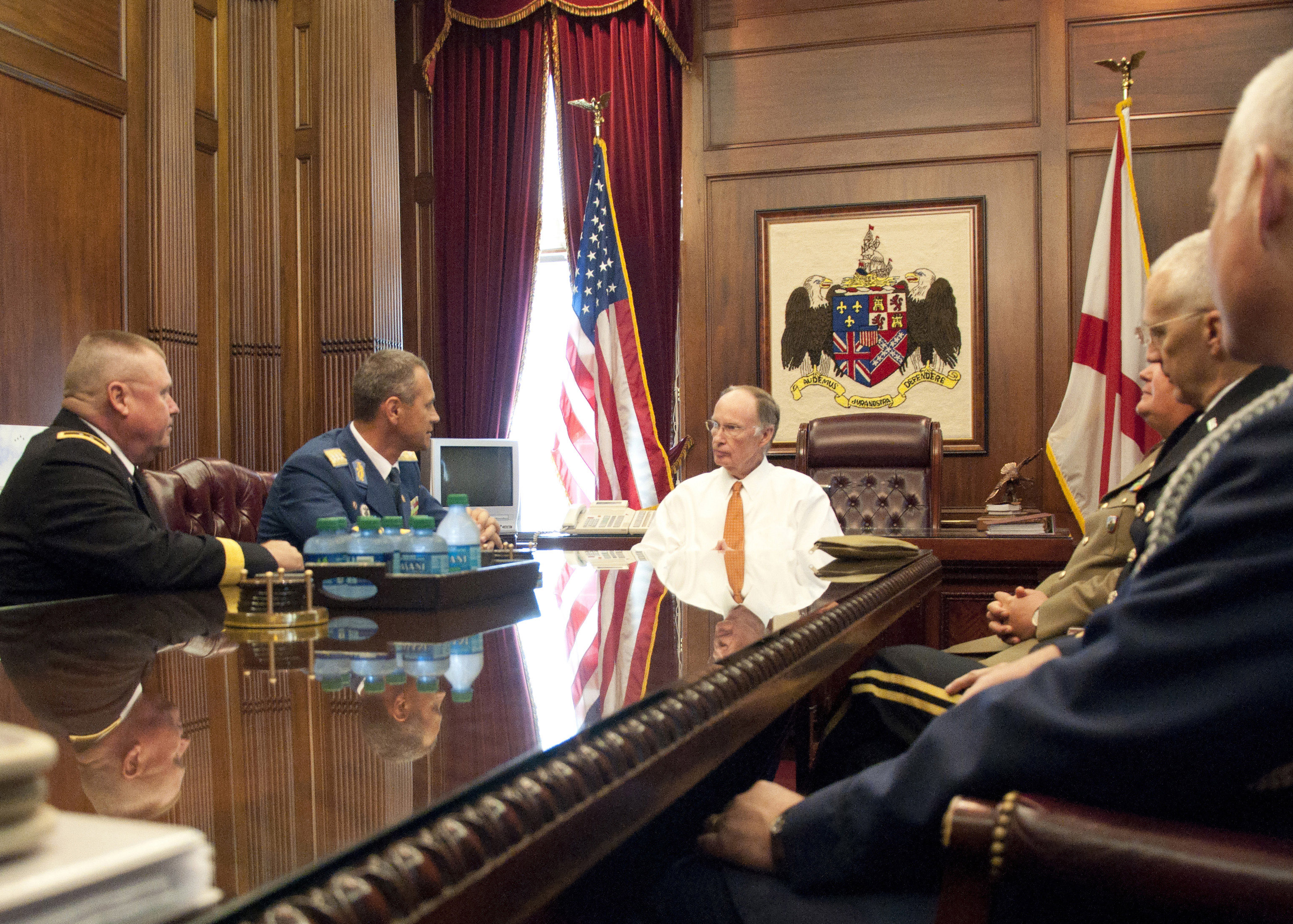
Romania's Chief of Defense and Alabama's Adjutant General meet with Alabama Governor Robert Bentley, September 2012

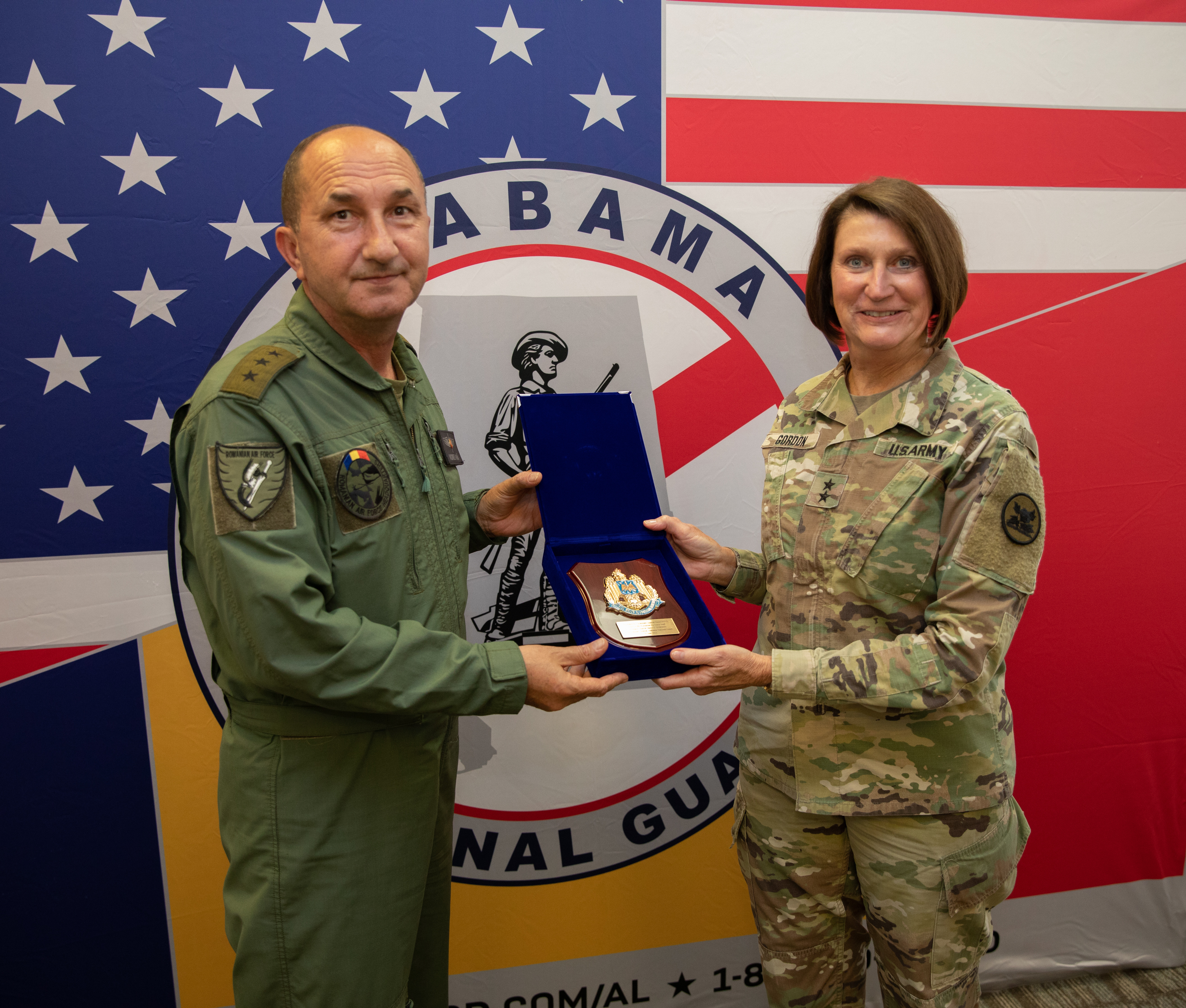
Romanian Air Force Chief of Staff Lt. Gen. Viorel Pană and Adjutant General Sheryl Gordon exchange gifts during an official visit

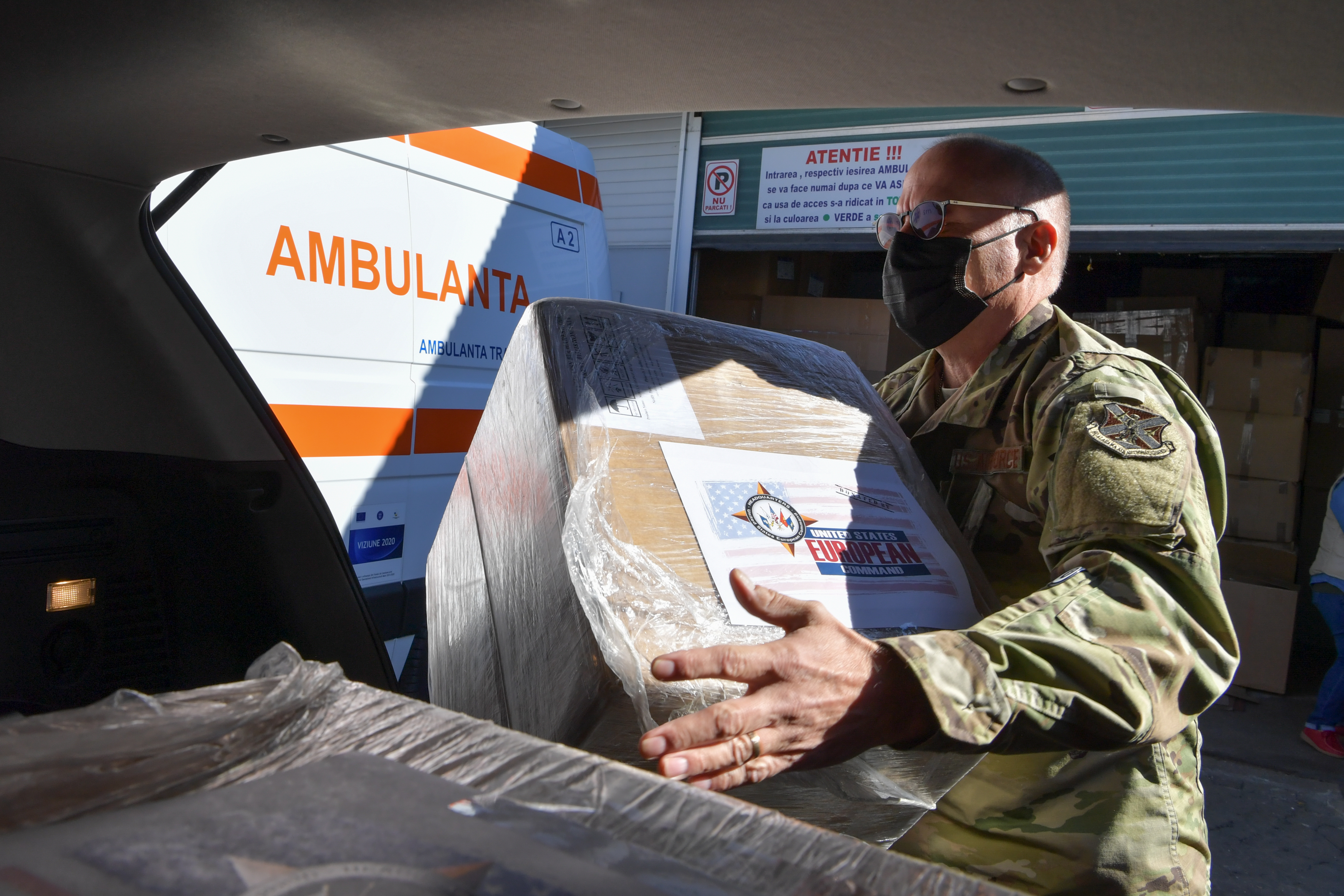
COVID-19 test kits delivered by the Alabama National Guard in 2021

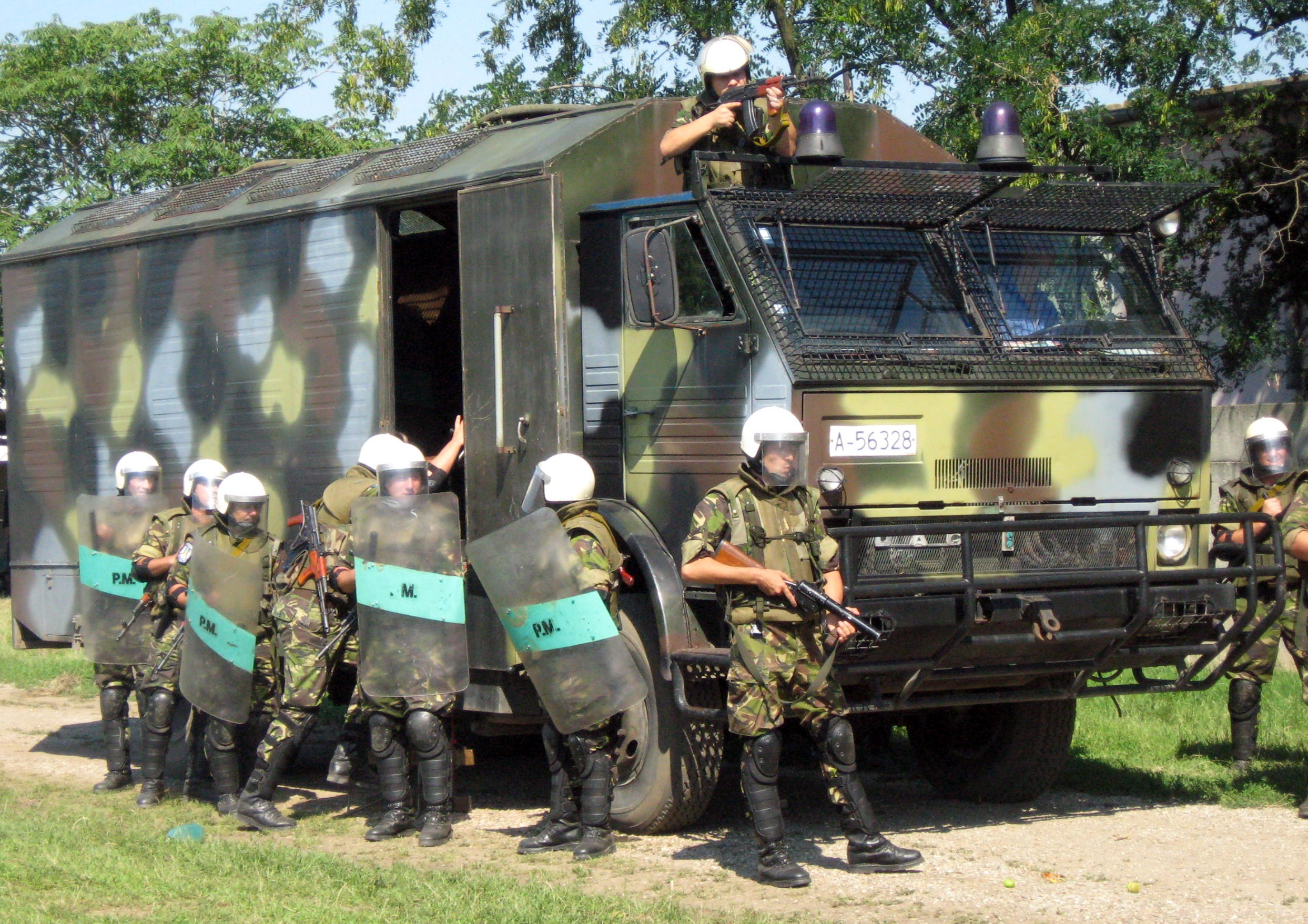
Romanian 265th Military Police Battalion practice training operations with Alabama Army National Guard military police in Romania, January 2013

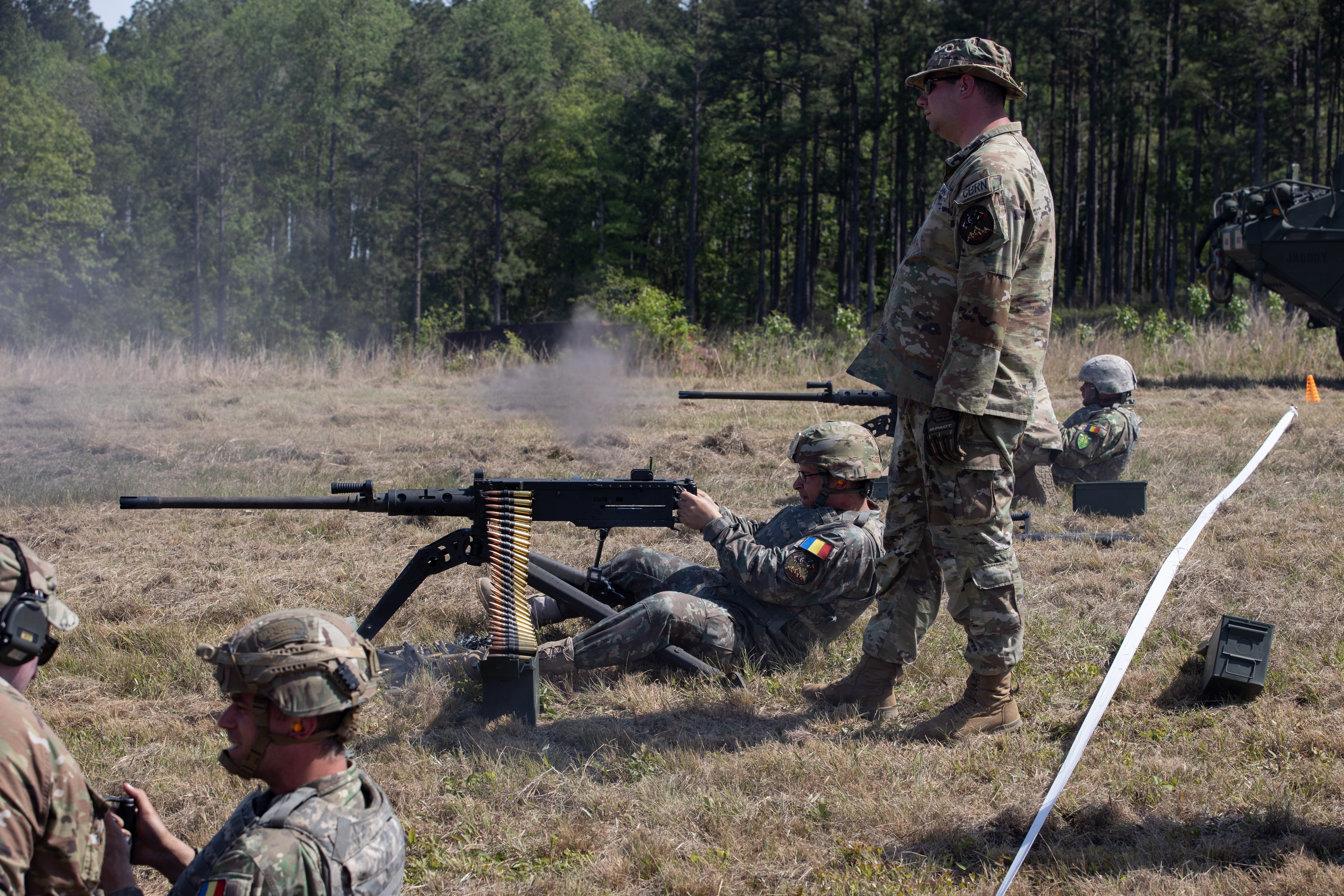
Alabama's 31st CBRN Brigade and Romania's 72nd NBC Defense Battalion training at Camp Shelby, April 2022

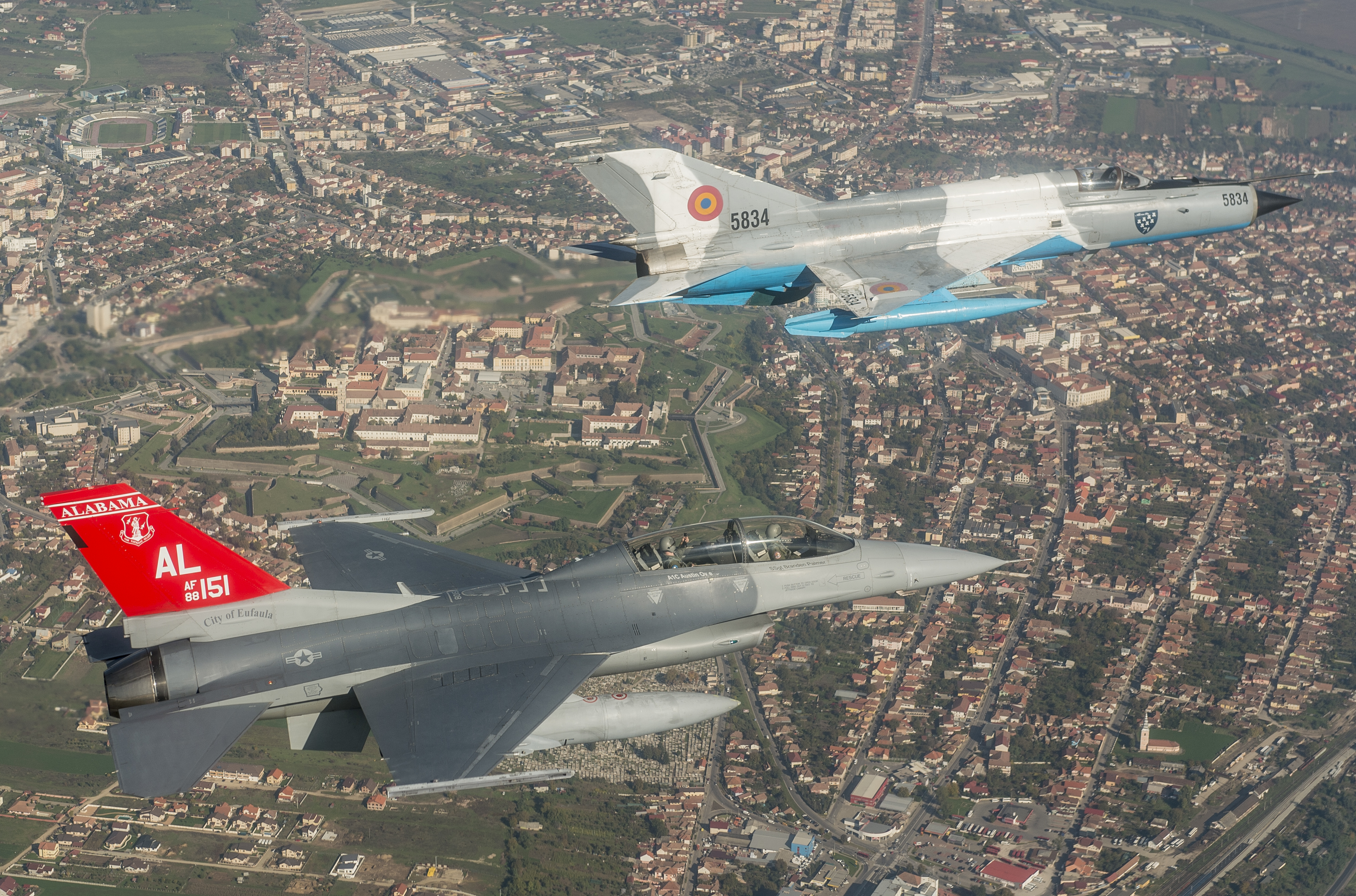
F-16 of the 100th Fighter Squadron flies in formation with a MiG-21 LanceR, Dacian Viper 2015 exercise

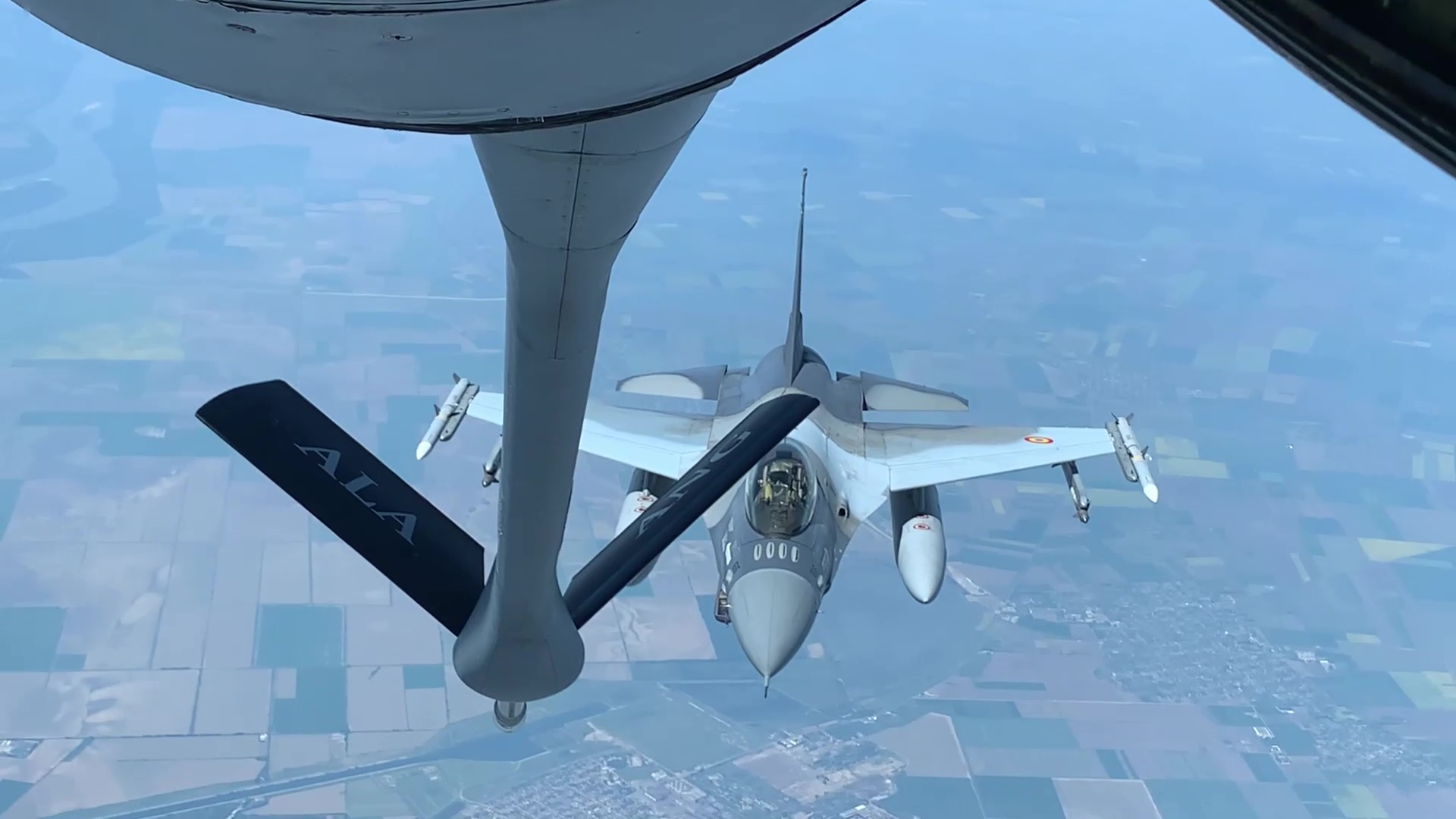
Romanian F-16 of the 53rd Fighter Squadron practice mid-air refueling with a KC-135 of the 117th Air Refueling Wing

== See also ==
- Romania–United States relations
