= Romanian-American organizations =

This is a list of Romanian-American organizations.

== Business ==
- Romanian-American Center Focus Publishing, Publisher of the Romanian-American Yellow Pages and Romanian Impact Magazine
- Romanian-American Chamber of Commerce
- Romanian-American Committee for private property
- Romanian-American Network Inc. a Romanian heritage and cultural oasis in USA
- Romanian Business Professionals is a non-profit organization with a membership that adheres to three primary objectives: networking and mutual support; learning/advancement of the members; Impacting the Romanian community (primarily in the US)

== Health care ==
- Romanian Medical Society of New York

== Culture ==
- Romanian-American Congress
- Romanian Folk Art Museum and Gift Gallery
- Romanian Student Club of Illinois
- League of Romanian Societies of America
- Maryhill Museum of Art
- Round Table Society NFP, Chicago, IL
- Organization of Romanian Americans (ORA) Carmichael, CA
- Romanian American Society of Washington State, Seattle, WA
- American Romanian Cultural Society; Seattle, WA
- Romanian American National Heritage Award; USA

== News ==
- Romanian Tribune newspaper published in Chicago in Romanian for this ethnic group living in United States
- Nine O'Clock, Daily English-language Romanian newspaper
- Gandacul de Colorado, Romanian newspaper in USA
- Romanian - American classified ads portal
- Radio27online.com
- Global Connect Network Inc.(GCN, GCNTV) Romanian IPTV, WebTv and Satellite TV company, providing Romanian TV channels to Romanians living in Canada and United States. https://www.gcntv.net

== Religion ==
- The Romanian Orthodox Monastery of Detroit, Romanian Orthodox monastery situated in the north of Detroit
- Romanian-Christian Music Association
- Romanian Orthodox Episcopate of America, Romanian administration for the Romanian-Orthodox parishes of USA
- Romanian Orthodox Parishes of USA and Canada, directory of Romanian Orthodox parishes in North America
