= Round Table Society =

The Round Table Society was a volunteer-run, charitable non-profit organization based in Chicago, Illinois. It was endorsed by the Romanian General Consulate, and the organization's mission was to facilitate intercultural exchange, strengthen the Romanian-American community, and create a sense of unity and belonging. The organization had no religious or political affiliations.

During the course of its existence, RTS offered many programs to the Romanian community of Chicago, including training webinars and even free housing for new families and individuals moving to Chicago from Romania, and several cultural and traditional events, including a Romanian Film Festival in Chicago.

RTS was founded by young volunteers from Chicago, including Ioana Salajanu, Relu and Cerasela Stan, Laszlo Revesz, Mihai Lehene, Catalin Viorel NAN and Carmen Sauciuc.

According to the Illinois Secretary of State, the non-profit organization underwent involuntary dissolution on April 11, 2008.
