= Haralamb H. Georgescu =

American architect

Haralamb Georgescu Harlan Georgesco
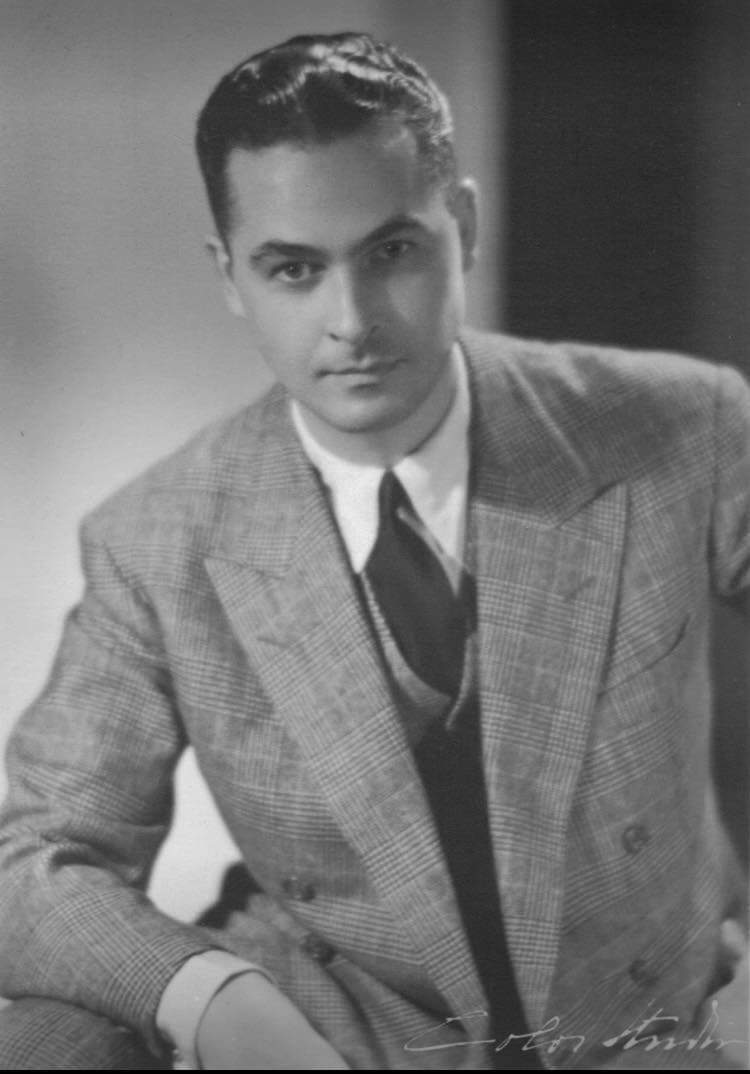
- Born: 1908 (age 117–118); București
- Occupation: Architect
- Children: Christopher Georgesco, sculptor, California
- Buildings: ARO Palace Hotel in Brașov * Halele Obor in București * Imobilul ARO in București

Haralamb H. Georgescu (1908–1977), also known as Harlan Georgesco, was a twentieth century Romanian-American modernist architect. He had a 44-year career spanning time in both Romania and the United States before dying in California in 1977.

== Early life and education ==
Georgescu was born in Pitești, Argeș (Romania) in 1908. He attended the Catholic Grammar School in Piteşti, the Junior High School in Iaşi, and the Senior High School in Alba Iulia before graduating from the Polytechnic Institute of Bucharest School of Architecture in 1933. He practiced architecture in Bucharest from 1933 until 1947 during which time he designed apartment buildings, hotels, theaters, churches, office buildings, factories and residences; some in collaboration with architect Horia Creangă, grand son of the famous Romanian writer Ion Creangă.

== Appointments ==
- 1939 – Appointed consulting architect to the City of Bucharest.
- 1940 – Appointed professor of architecture, School of Architecture at the Polytechnic Institute of Bucharest.
- 1941 – Appointed consulting architect to the Telephone Company of Bucharest.
- 1945 – Tenure granted as professor of architecture.

== Building ==
Buildings in Bucharest designed by Georgescu include:

- The ARO Motion Picture Theatre (800 seats, now Patria Cinema)
- The National Theatre (2,400 seats)
- Pescarus Restaurant at Herastrau Lake
- Mon Jardin and the Melody Bar Night Club
- The ARO Hotel in Braşov
- The Malaxa Steel Mill for 10,000 employees
- The Romanian Life Insurance Company buildings at 91 Victory Avenue in Bucharest
- The Obor Market

Other work outside of Bucharest included:

- The Romanian pavilion at the Leipzig Sample Fair
- The Concordia Plant railroad car factory in Ploeshti

As architect to King Michael:

- The Yacht Club in Eforie on Sea
- Summer Residence
- Boathouse at Snagov near Bucharest

== Awards ==
- First prize for the Bucharest City Hall competition in 1936
- First prize for the Bucharest City Hall Club for Employees in 1942
- First prize for the Savings and Deposit Bank of Bucharest

== United States ==
In 1945, Romania fell under Soviet domination and Georgescu fled on September 16, 1947, arriving in the United States five weeks later on October 21. Four months later in February 1948, he was appointed professor of architecture (visiting associate) at the University of Nebraska School of Architecture in Lincoln, where he taught Elementary Design, Advance Design and Civic Art. He resigned in 1951 to relocate his young family to Los Angeles, California, where he was employed by interior designer Paul László (1951–1953), McAllister & Wagner Architects (1953–1954), and Kenneth Lind,(1954–1957). In 1957 Georgescu opened his own practice in partnership with James Larson before going on his own in 1959.

Georgescu's projects in the United States included:

- St. Mary's Orthodox Church, 3256 Warren Road, Cleveland, Ohio
- St. George Orthodox Cathedral, 9 Mile Road, Southfield, Michigan
- Apartment building at 691 Levering Avenue, Westwood, Los Angeles, California.
- Apartment building on Dorothy Avenue in West Los Angeles, California.
- Pasinetti Residence, 1421 Summitridge Drive, Beverly Hills, California.
- Georgesco Residence, 420 S. Westgate Avenue, Brentwood, California.
- Residence on Crescent Avenue, Beverly Hills, California.
- Residence on Kearsarge Street, Brentwood, California.
- Residence on Arno Way, Pacific Palisades, California.
- California Home for the Aged in Reseda, California
- Several residences, restaurants and other projects in and around Palm Springs, California

Many biographies on Georgescu cite the Pasinetti Residence as his best example of residential work in the U.S. built for his client, Italian writer and academic P. M. Pasinetti, also known as Pier Maria Pasinetti, in 1958, this modernist house was featured in the January 1959 issue of Arts & Architecture Magazine. Pasinetti used the house as a part-time residence from 1958 until he died in 2006.

Between 1959 and 1963, Georgescu was associated with Palm Springs-based designer Howard Lapham and designed several large residences, apartment buildings, restaurants and a country club in the desert resort communities in and around Palm Springs.

In the 1960s, Georgescu developed several visionary proposals for the city of Los Angeles with an articulated system of 640-foot high-rise towers containing vertical streets and suspended house lots. His proposals were widely published and highly praised by architectural critics, but never built.

== Death ==
Georgescu died in an accident in Venice, California, in 1977 at age 69. In a eulogy by Nathan H. Shapira of University of California, Los Angeles, Georgescu was described as an avid traveler and a talented writer and critic. Georgescu was survived by his son, Christopher Georgesco, a sculptor.

Part of Georgesu's Archives were acquired in 2008 by the J. Paul Getty Trust Library, of The Getty Research Institute. The remainder of his Archives are at The Mincu University of Architecture and Urbanism, in Bucharest, Romania.
