= Christopher Georgesco =

American sculptor (born 1950)

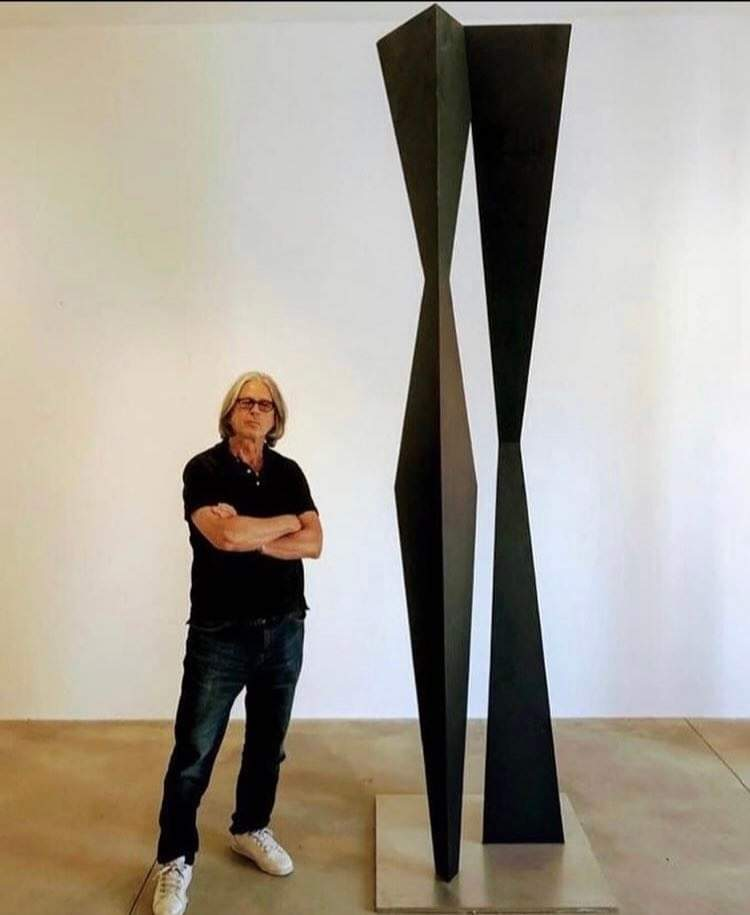
- Sculptor Christopher Georgesco
- Born: 25 June 1950 (age 76); Lincoln, Nebraska, U.S.
- Education: Santa Monica College; University of Santa Monica
- Occupation: Sculptor
- Years active: 1968–present

Christopher Georgesco (Romanian: Georgescu; born June 25, 1950 in Lincoln, Nebraska) is an American sculptor. He is the son of modernist architect Haralamb H. Georgescu.

He began his career in Venice, California in 1968, where he worked until 1980. His studio was located on Abbot Kenny, formerly West Washington Blvd. His first Show was at Newspace Gallery, Los Angeles, where he continues to be represented more than 35 years later.

He now lives on the outskirts of Palm Springs, where he built a Studio Compound.

His first solo show was deemed an overnight success by William Wilson, critic for The Los Angeles Times, and was picked up by L.A.'s top collectors. Wilson also cited Christopher Georgesco as "pushing the art world's masterpiece button" with his 10-foot-tall (3.0 m) Totemic Concrete & Steel Columns and Tripods. His first solo show was followed by an exhibition at the Los Angeles County Museum of Art titled L.A.8.

In an article in Art News, Richard Armstrong, the former curator of the La Jolla Museum of Contemporary Art, CA, cited Christopher Georgesco as being one of the most interesting sculptors in Los Angeles." Armstrong also claims Christopher Georgesco has few peers among L.A. Sculptors in an article in Art in America." Georgesco has continued to work with the same vocabulary of shapes for the last 35 years. He exhibited in the Netherlands, and The Ludwig Forum Museum in Aachen, Germany.

== Public collections ==
- American Embassy, Bucharest, Romania
- Metropolitan Museum of Art, New York, NY
- Grand Hyatt Hotel, Tokyo, Japan
- La Jolla Museum of Contemporary Art, California
- Laguna Beach Museum of Contemporary Art, California
- Palm Springs Art Museum, Palm Springs, California
- University of California Los Angeles, California
- University of Santa Barbara, California
- Valley Presbyterian Hospital, Los Angeles, California
- Plaza Pasadena, City of Pasadena, California
- King World Productions, Los Angeles, California
- Princes Cruise Lines, Installation Italy
- Caribbean Cruise Lines, Installation Norway
- Knapp Communications, Los Angeles, California
- McCrory Corporate, New York, NY
- Raychem Corporation, Los Angeles, California
- Sea Horse Corporation, Manzanillo, Mexico
- Pasadena City College, California
- City of Palm Springs, California
