= Horia Creangă =

Romanian architect

- Born: 20 July 1892; Bucharest, Kingdom of Romania
- Died: 1 August 1943 (aged 51); Vienna, Austria
- Education: Bucharest School of Architecture; École des Beaux-Arts
- Occupation: Architect
- Spouse: Lucia Dumbrăveanu
- Children: 1
- Buildings: ARO building

Horia Creangă (20 July 1892 – 1 August 1943) was a Romanian architect and key figure of the modernist movement in Romania. Described as "the true founder of the modernist age" in his native county, he is best known as the designer of the first large scale modernist building in Romania, the ARO building on Magheru Boulevard, Bucharest, completed in 1931.

== Early life ==
Born in Bucharest on 20 July 1892, the grandson of the famous Romanian writer Ion Creangă, he studied at the Bucharest School of Architecture in 1916 before attending the École des Beaux-Arts in Paris, graduating in 1925. His mentor, Gustave Umbdenstock, then secured a position for him in the Romanian Nord Railway company, and in late 1926, he returned to Romania with his wife Lucia.

== Career ==
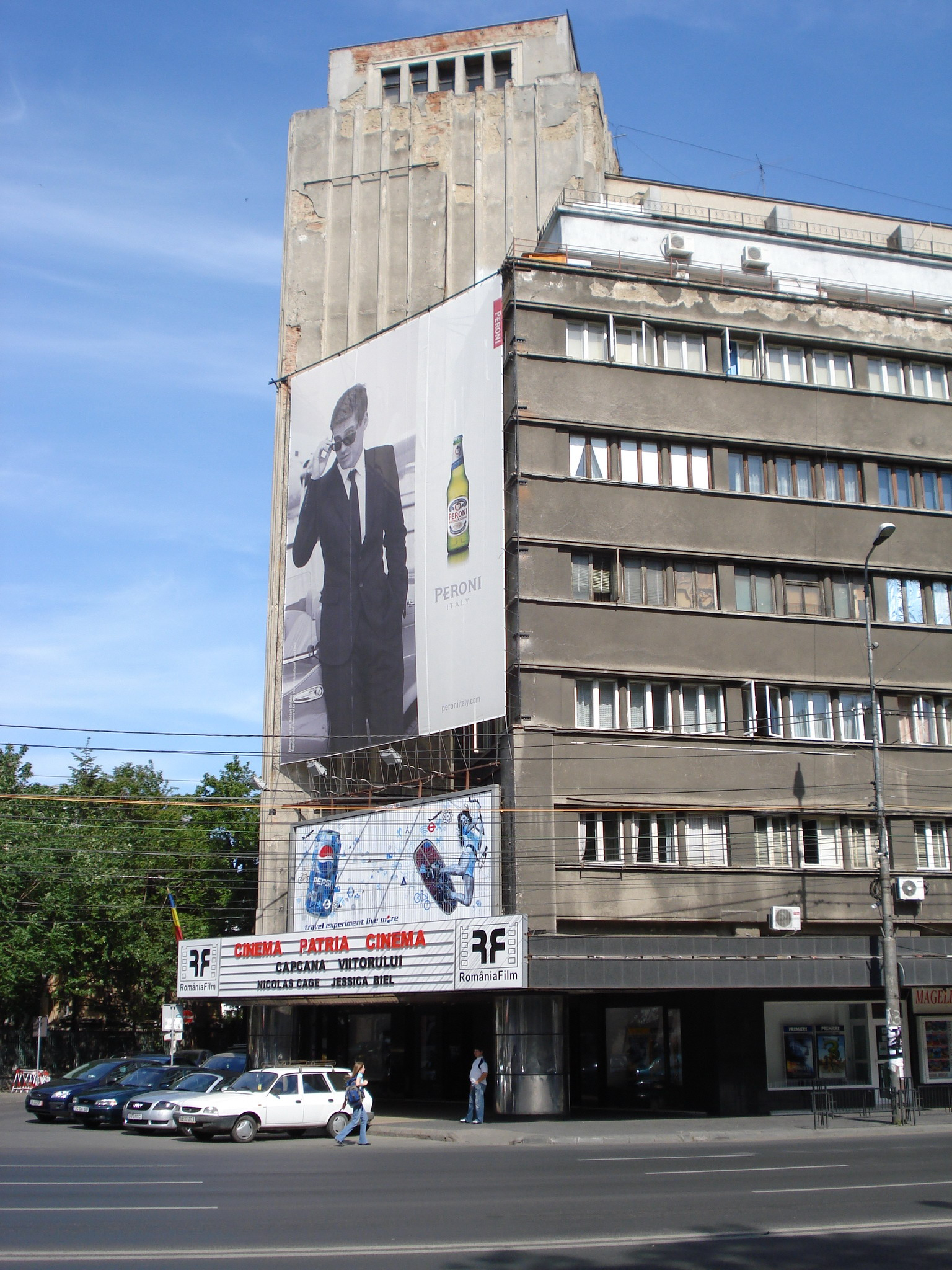
ARO Building, Bucharest, 1930–31

Creangă was one of the first architects in Romania to adopt the basic elements of modernist design, in designs which progressed rapidly from complex stepped forms in his first projects of the late 1920s to simple unadorned volumes, or dominant horizontal and vertical massing in the 1930s. This evolution is evident in his villas designed from 1929 to 1930, progressing from the blocky volumes elaborated with statuary and sculpture of the Cornel Medrea Villa in 1929 to the spare unadorned cubic volume of the Ion Miclescu Villa, completed the next year.

In 1929 Creangă, in collaboration with his brother, Ion, and his wife, won the competition to design the ARO building for the Asigurarea Românească insurance company, a multi-use building including shops, offices and apartments, and eventually a cinema. Completed in 1931, after the design was simplified into simple bold horizontal and vertical masses, it is the first important large scale modernist building completed in Romania., and established Creangă's career.

In 1935, he opened an office with architects Haralamb Georgescu and Nicolae Nedelescu, working primarily for three clients: ARO insurance, Malaxa industries, and Bucharest City Hall. For these clients Creangă designed industrial, office and residential buildings, notably including the Malaxa Industries factories (1930–1940), becoming one of the most respected modernists in industrial architecture. The Encyclopedia of 20th Century Architecture states that "..despite the austerity of Creanga's modernist vocabulary, he reached a remarkable expressive force that remained unequaled in the production of the industrial architecture."

Throughout the 1930s, he designed numerous villas and small apartment buildings, as well as public buildings like the Stadionul Republicii. His Malaxa Factories and the Malaxa-Burileanu Building, with bold horizontal lines, unadorned surfaces and large areas of glass, are the most clearly Bauhaus influenced buildings in Romania. His large scale work of the later 1930s however showed an influence of the stylised classical of Italian architecture of the 1930s, such as the formal façades, with fine vertical ribs of the ARO Palace Hotel in Brașov and the Cultural Palace in Cernăuți.

Creangă's work was not uncontroversial. The ARO building which made his reputation and influenced the embrace of Modernism in Romania was fiercely criticized as well. His works were not published by mainstream Romanian industrial publications until the late 1930s.

Creangă was married to fellow architect Lucia Dumbrăveanu, with whom he had a daughter, Mihaela Creangă-Mihăescu. He owned two apartments in Lahovari Square, where he lived and had his workshop. His career was cut short by his death when he was only 51.

== Selected projects ==
Drawn from the article on Horia Creangă from the Century of Romanian Architecture website, and Romanian Modernism 1920–1940

- Teatrul Giulești (now Opera Copiilor), Calea Giulești, Bucharest (1927–29)
- Corneliu Medrea Villa, Andrei Mureșan Street 2, Bucharest (1929)
- Villa Ion Miclescu, 56 Paris Street, Bucharest (1930)
- ARO Building, 12-14 Magheru Boulevard, Bucharest (1930–1931); Patria Cinema added 1934–35
- Dr. Petru Groza Villa, Deva (1929–1931)
- Villa Thomas, 15 Iatropol Street, Bucharest (1931)
- Villa Alexandru Bunescu, 12 Aleea Alexandru, Bucharest (1932)
- Anton Davidoglu apartments, Dacia Boulevard corner Piața Spaniei, Bucharest (1932)
- Republic Stadium, Bucharest (with Haralamb Georgescu) (1933–1939), demolished 1988
- Elena Ottulescu apartments, 12 General Gheorghe Manu Street, Bucharest (1934–1935)
- Vila Elizabeta Cantacuzino, Aleea Alexandru nr. 15, Bucharest (1936)
- ARO Apartment Building, 91-93 Calea Victoriei, Bucharest (1936–1938)
- Malaxa (later FAUR) Factory, auto factory, pipe factory, administration and entrance, Bucharest (1930-1939)
- Malaxa-Burileanu Building, 35 Magheru Boulevard, Bucharest (1935–1937)
- Low cost housing complex, 52-58 Șoseaua Iancului, 4-24 Victor Manu Street, Bucharest (1937)
- National-Cultural Palace, Teatral'na Ploshcha (Theatre Square), Cernăuți, (now Chernivtsi, Ukraine) (1937–40).
- ARO Palace Hotel, Brașov (with Haralamb Georgescu) (1937–1939)

== Gallery ==
Central Market, Obor, 1936–50

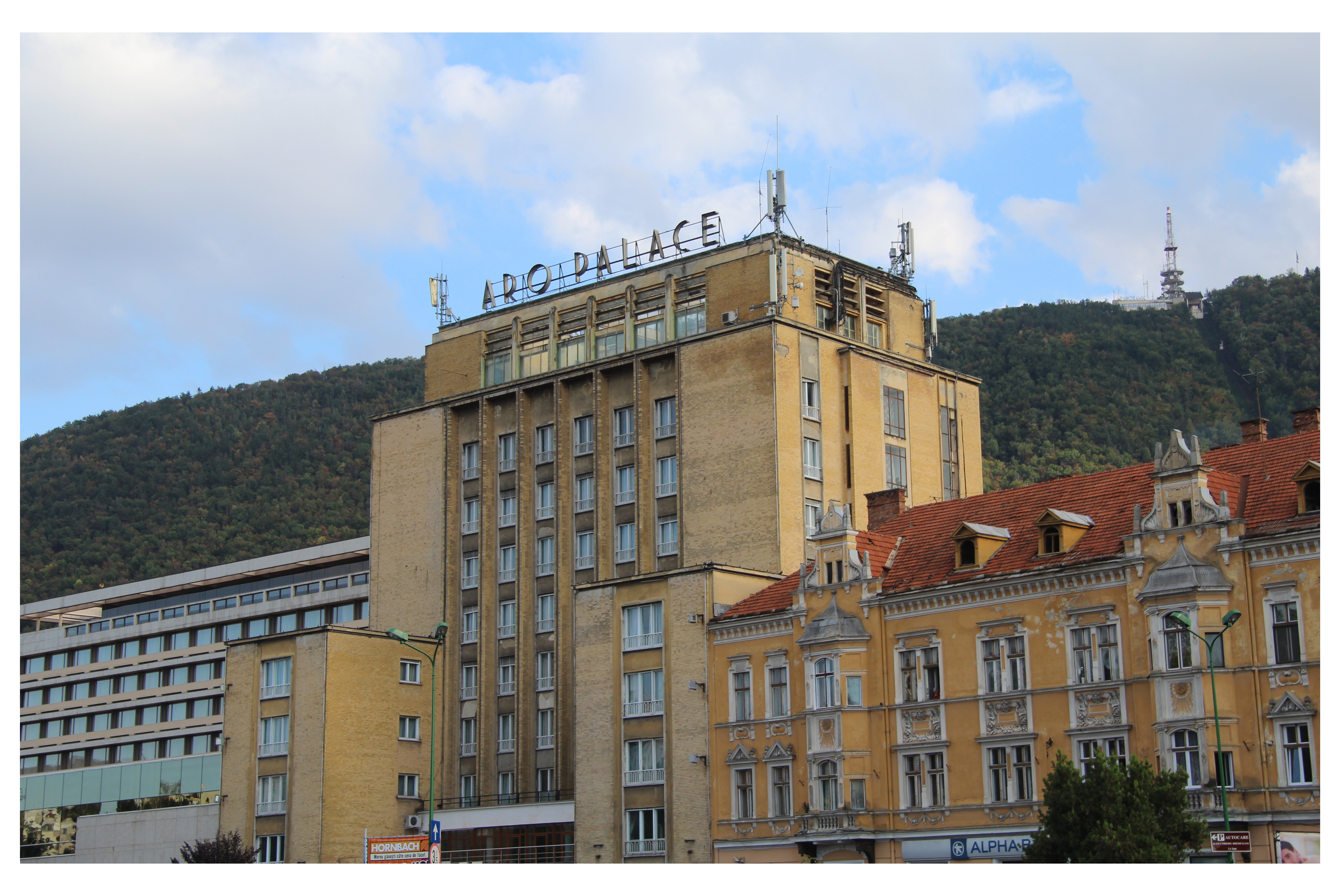
ARO Palace, Brașov, 1937–39

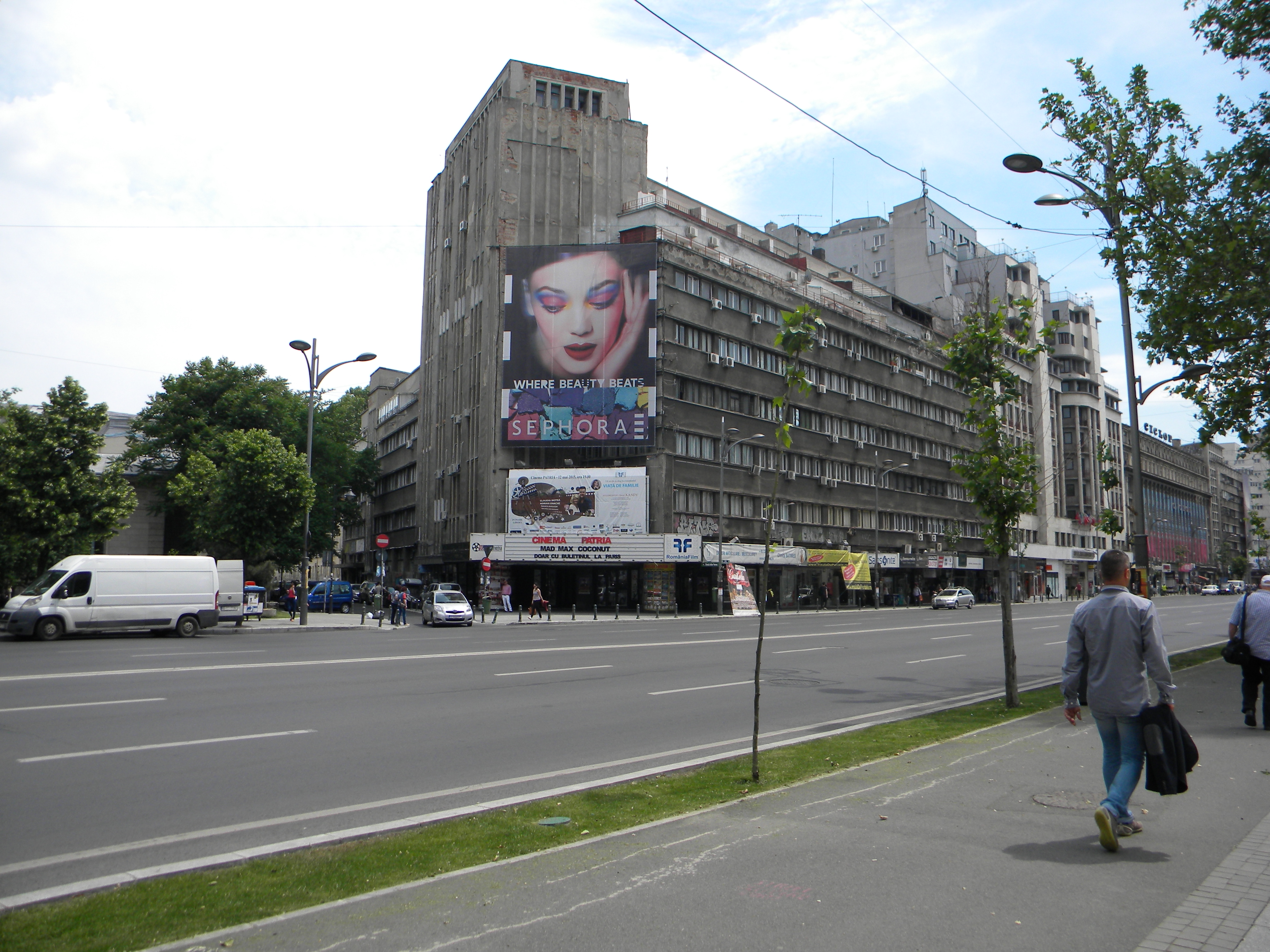
ARO Block, Bucharest, 1930–31

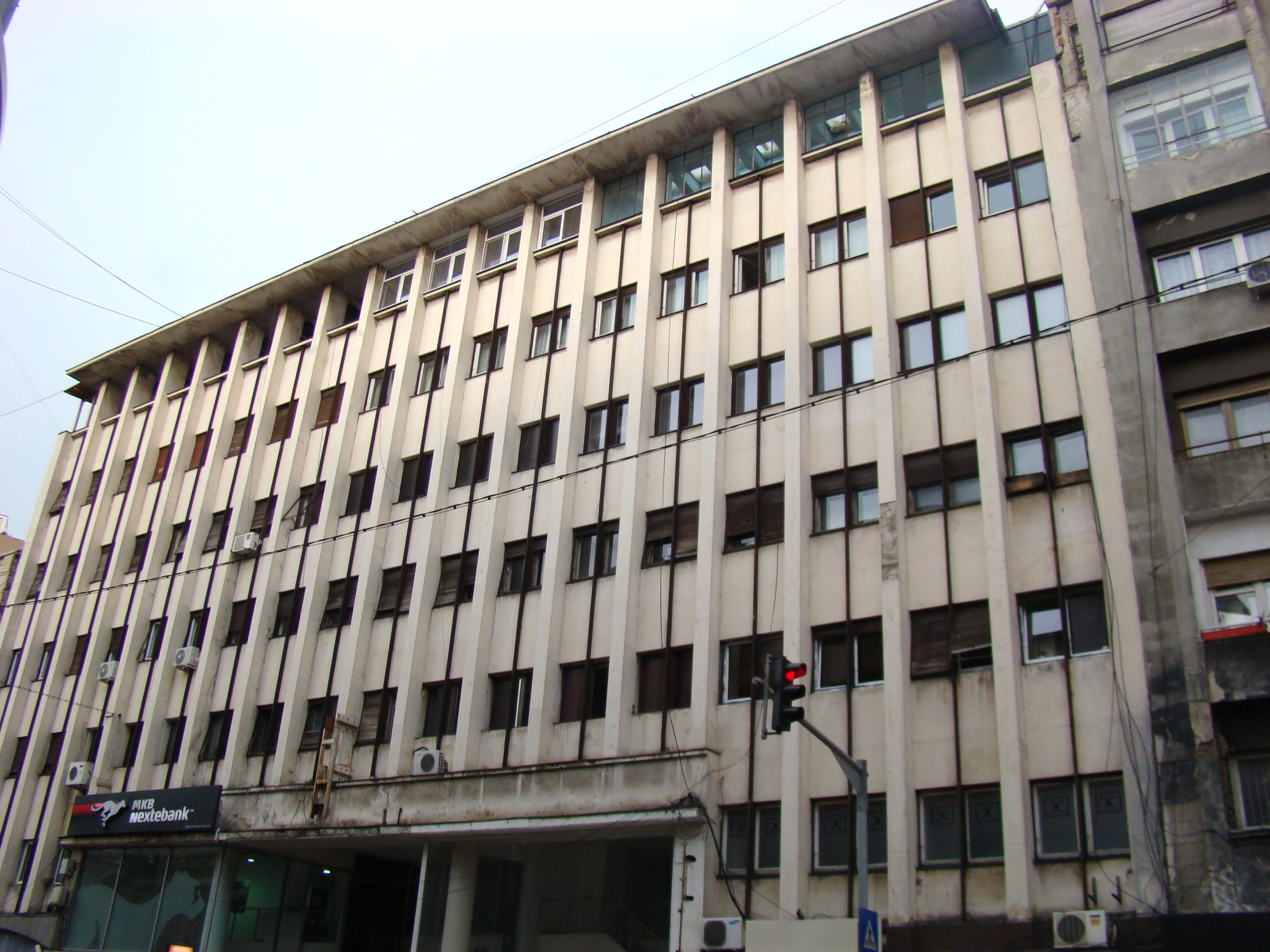
ARO Apartments, Calea Victoriei, 1936–38

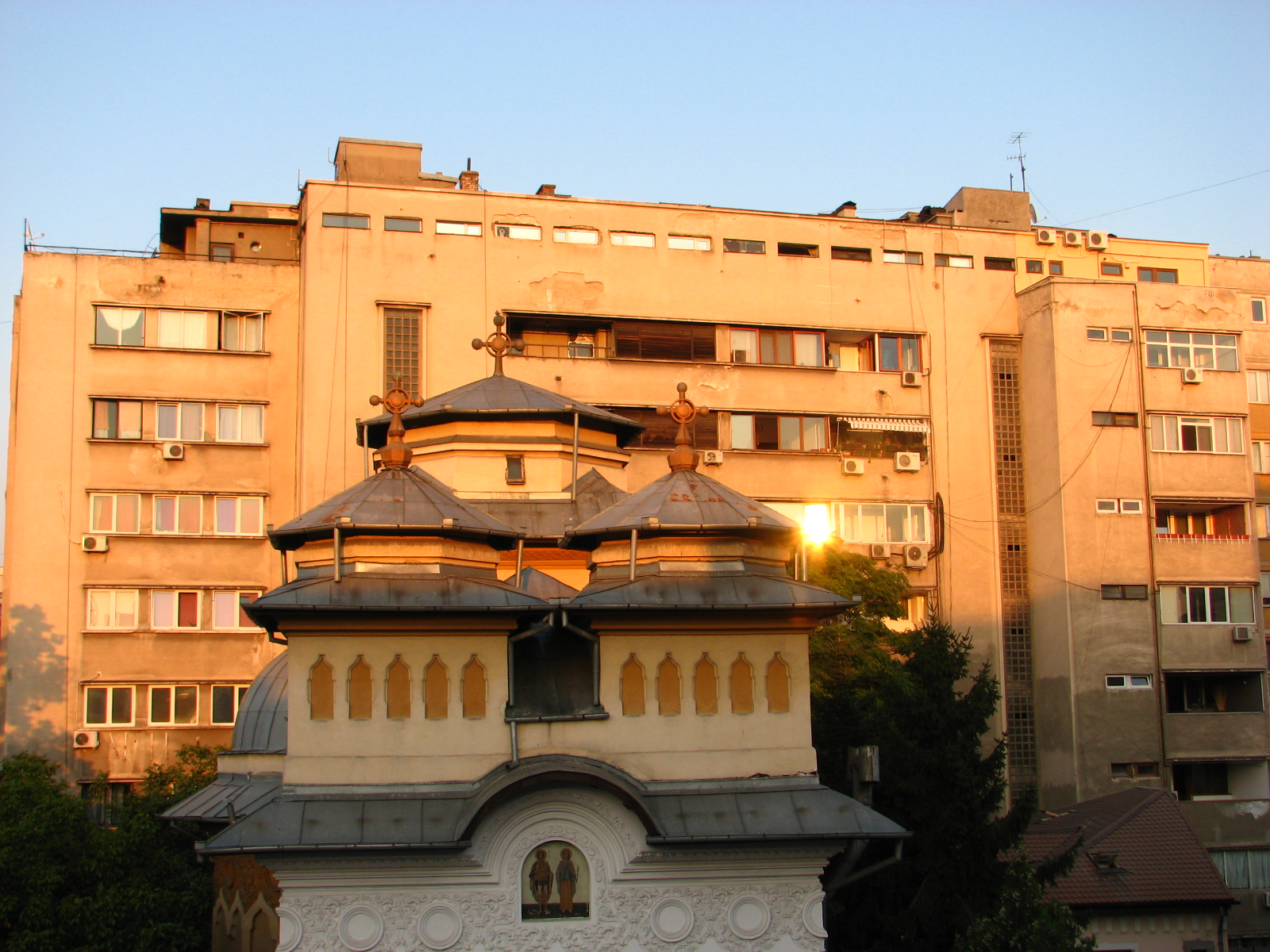
Malaxa-Burileanu Building, Bucharest, 1935–37

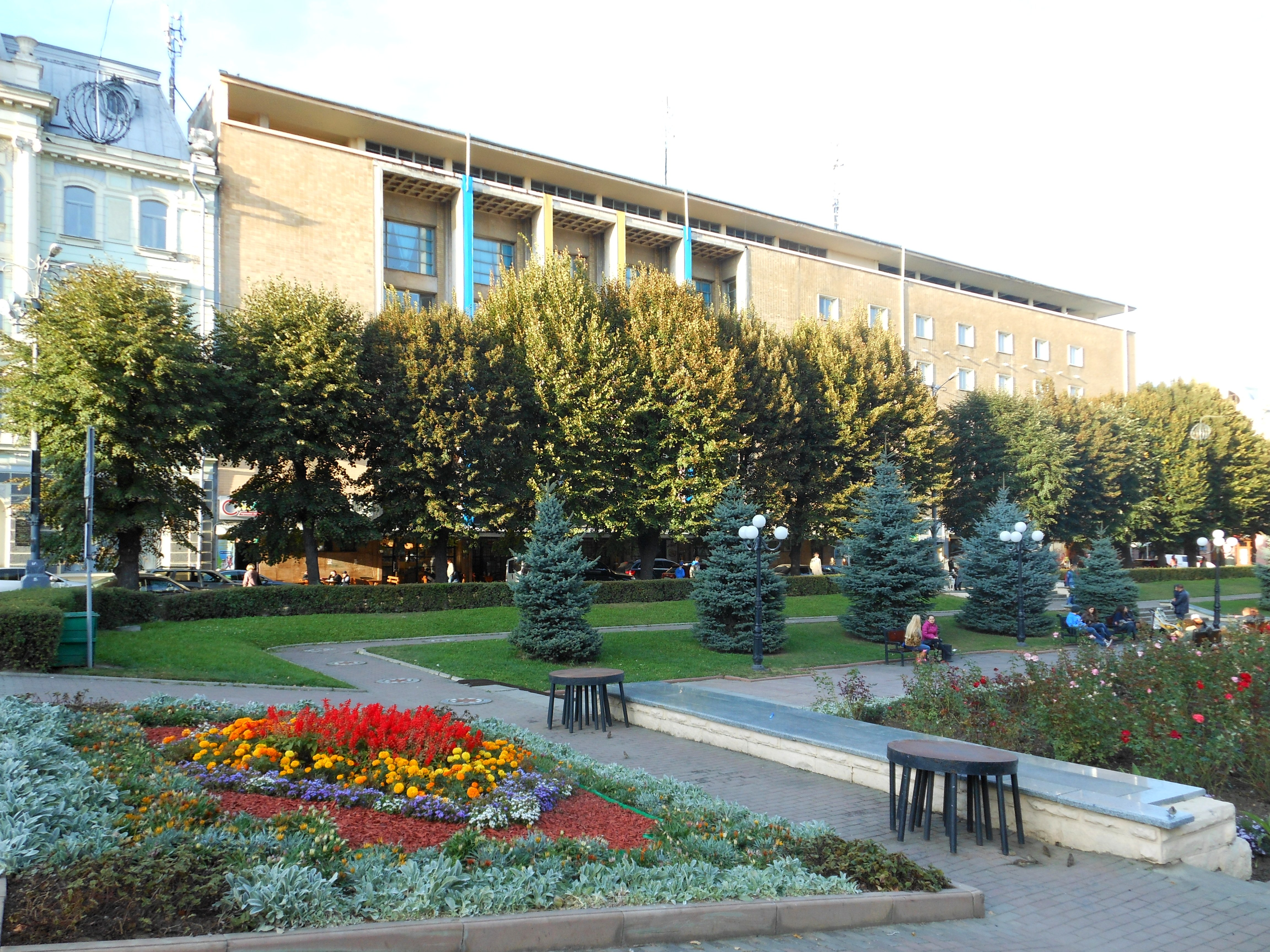
National-Cultural Palace, Theatre Square, Chernivtsi, Ukraine, 1937–40
