= Bulevardul Magheru =

Major street in Bucharest, Romania

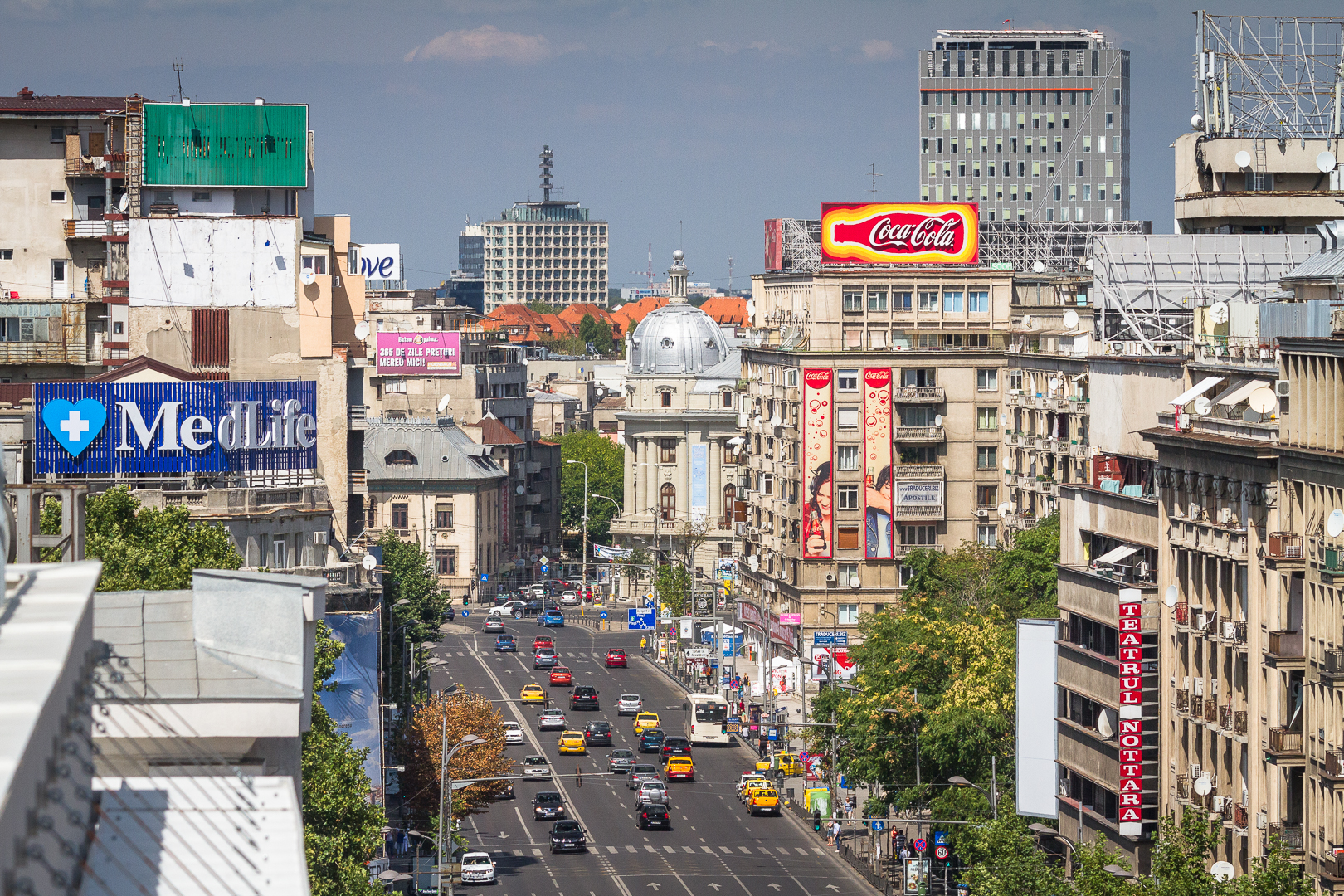
- View towards the north
- Interactive map of Bulevardul Magheru
- Native name: Bulevardul General Gheorghe Magheru (Romanian)
- Former names: Ion C. Brătianu, Take Ionescu, Republicii
- Location: Bucharest, Romania
- Nearest metro station: Universitate; Piața Romană
- Coordinates: 44°26′33.64″N 26°5′54.91″E
- South end: Nicolae Bălcescu Boulevard
- North end: Piața Romană

Bulevardul Magheru is a major street in central Bucharest. Built in the early 20th century, it is named after General Gheorghe Magheru.

Together with Bulevardul Bălcescu, Magheru connects Piața Romană and Piața Universității squares and was in the 1930s and 1940s Bucharest's most modern part. This is one of Europe and world's most representative modernist boulevards, where the architecture in vogue in the 1930s is prevalent.

Part of the major thoroughfare than runs through the middle of Bucharest, it is continued to the south of C. A. Rosetti Street by Nicolae Bălcescu Boulevard and then by Ion C. Brătianu Boulevard, and toward the north by Lascăr Catargiu Boulevard and Șoseaua Kiseleff.

== Notable buildings and structures ==
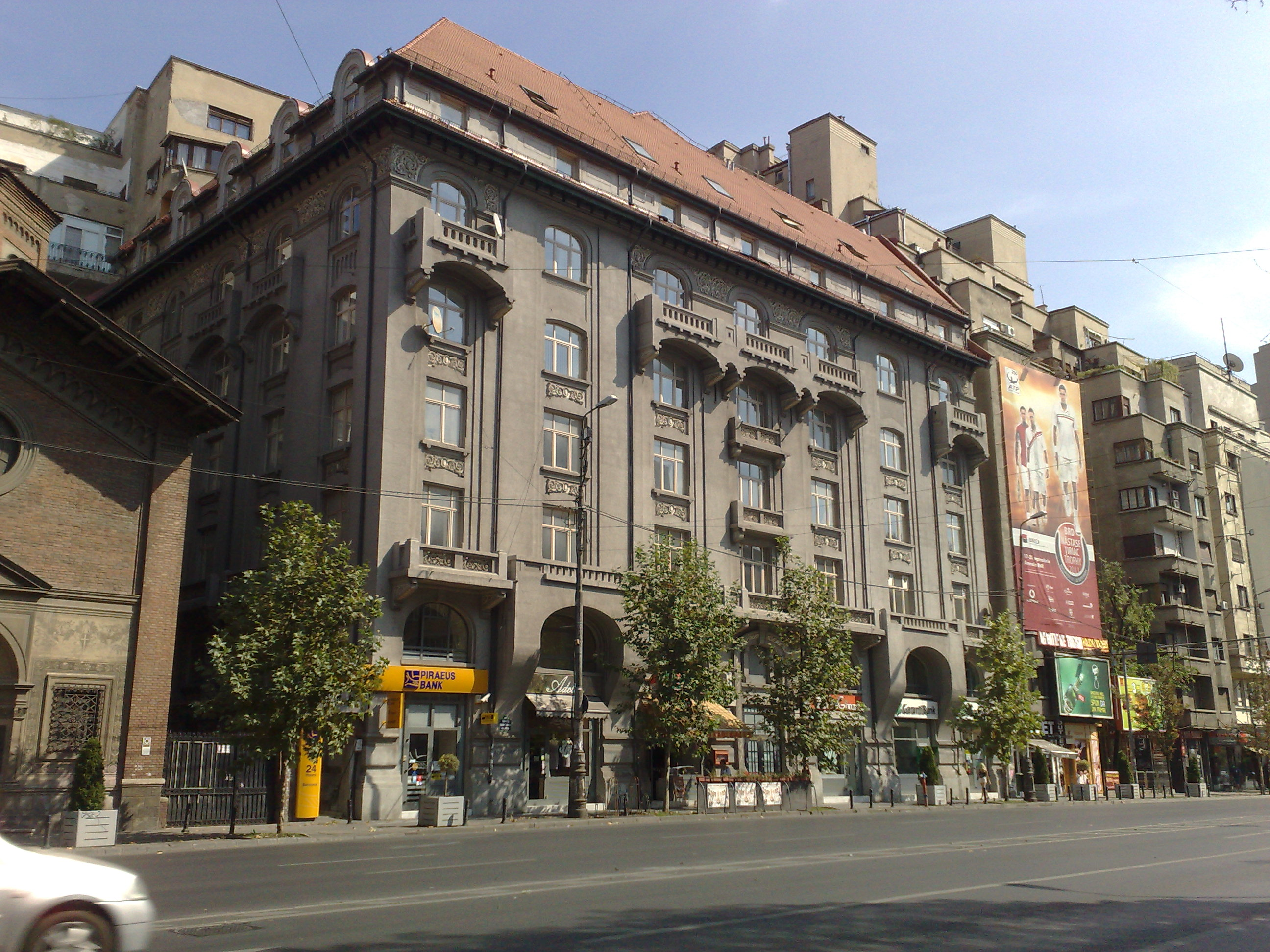
The Gas and Electricity Society Palace

Hotel Ambasador

Some notable buildings on Bulevardul Magheru are listed below, in the order in which they were built.

- Ciclop Parking Garage, built in 1923 by Constantin Iotzu, now abandoned
- Hotel Lido, built in 1930
- Patria Cinema, housed in Horia Creangă's modernist 10-story ARO building, built in 1931
- Gas and Electricity Society Palace, built in 1935
- Scala Cinema, built in 1937
- Scala building, built in 1937, destroyed during the 1977 earthquake, rebuilt after that
- Casata building, built in 1938, destroyed during the 1977 earthquake, rebuilt after that
- Hotel Ambasador, built in 1939
- Nottara Theater, founded in 1947
- ITB building, built in 1959
- Eva building, built in 1961
- ONT building, built in 1961
- Piața Romană metro station, opened in 1988

The Dimitrie Sturdza House is just off the boulevard, on Arthur Verona Street.

== See also ==
- List of most expensive streets by city

== Gallery ==
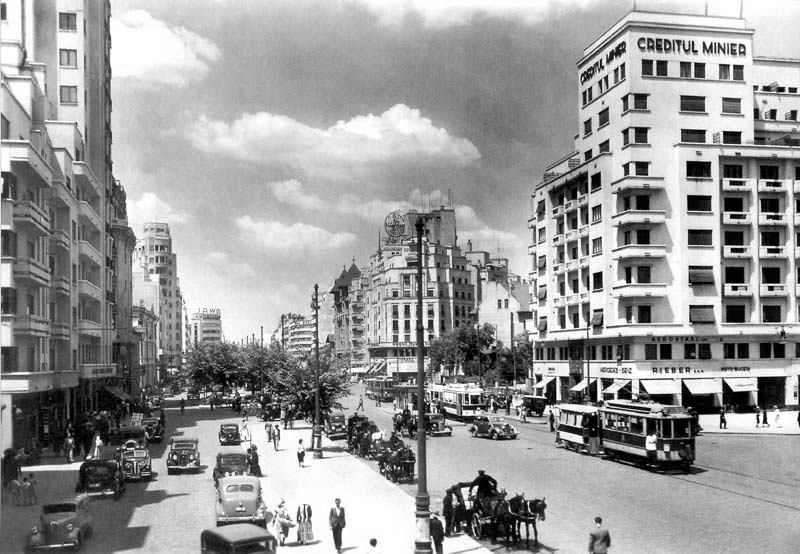
The boulevard in the late 1930s

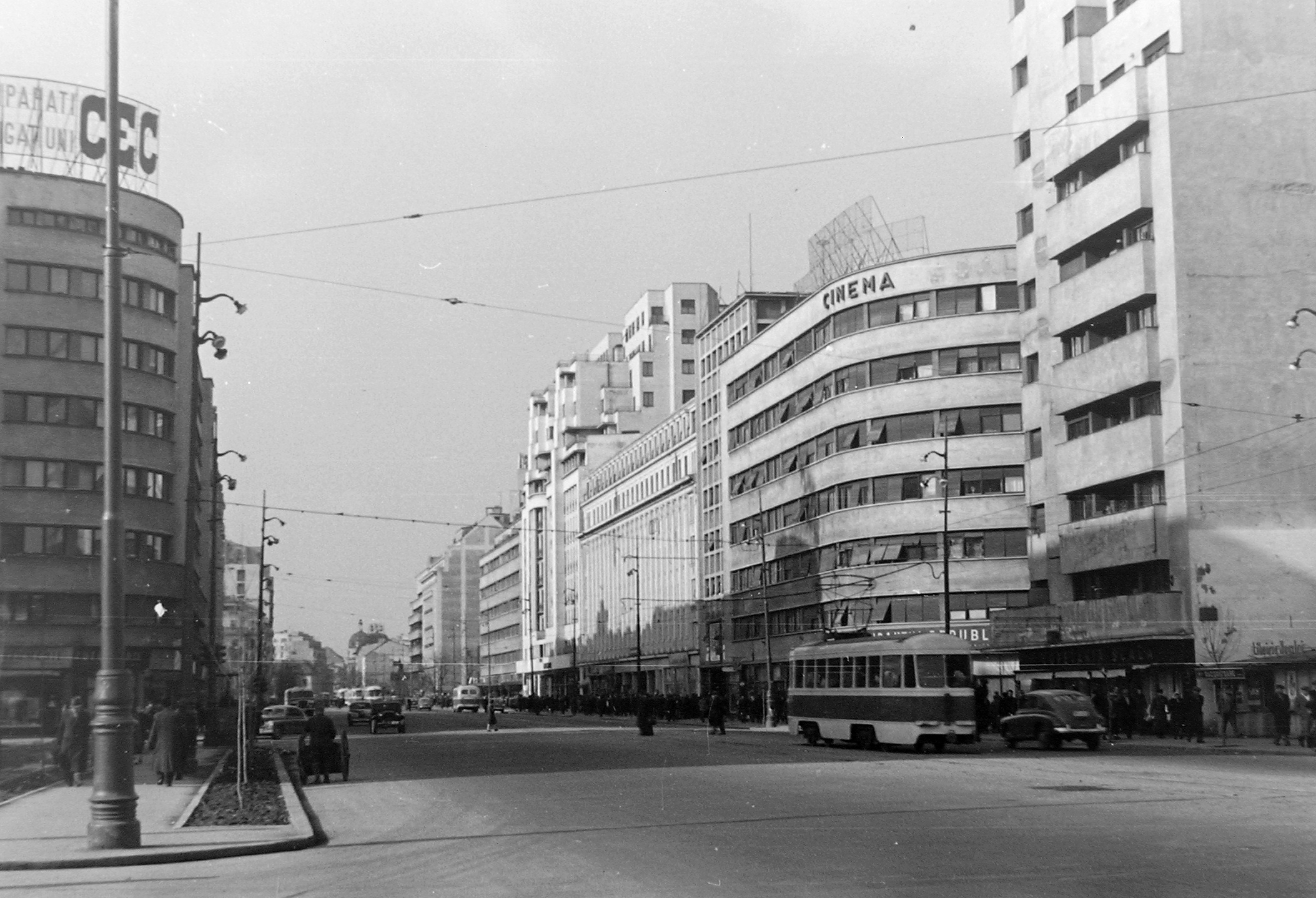
The boulevard in 1958

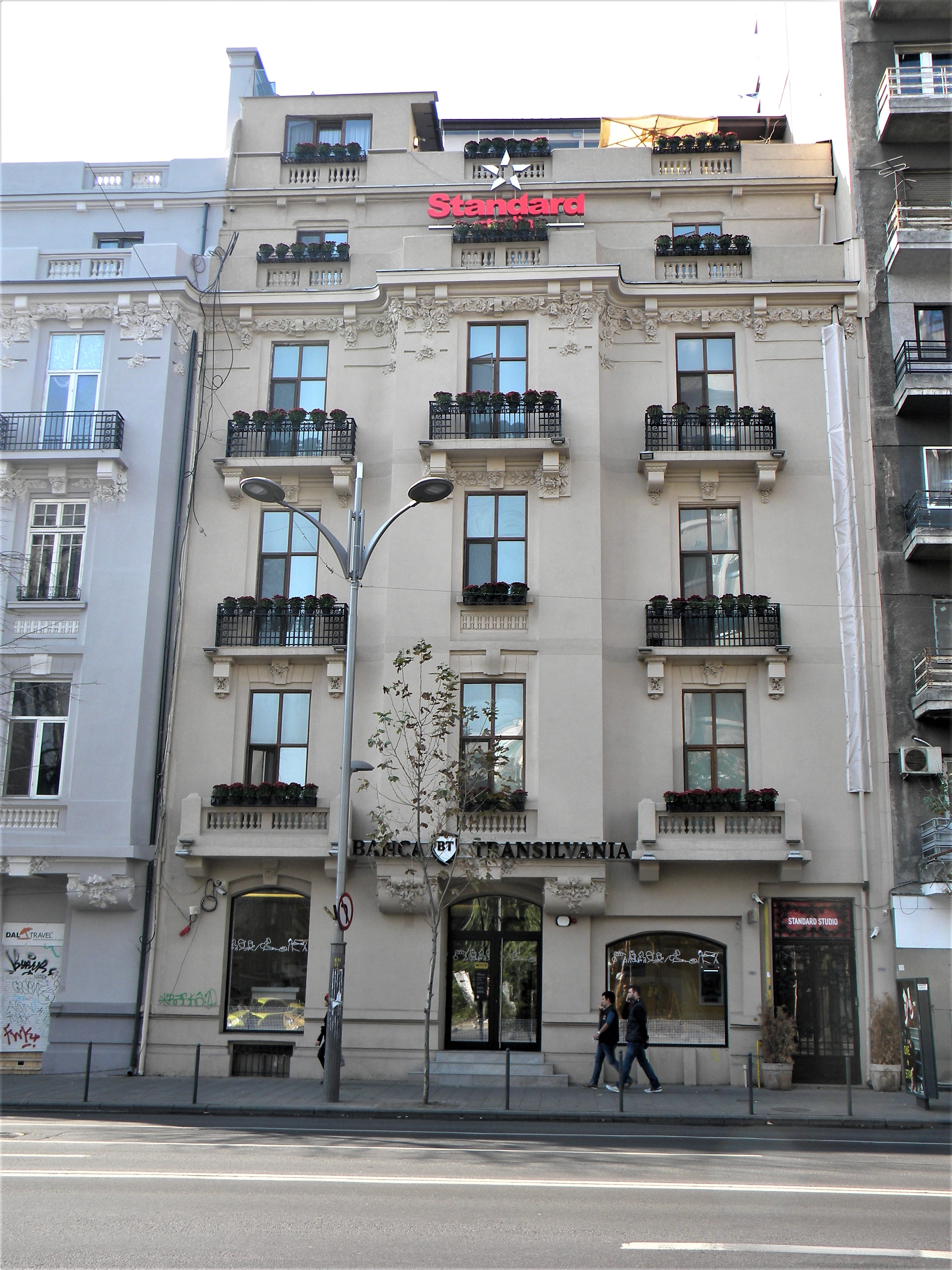
The boulevard in 2017
