= Patria Cinema =

Movie theatre in Bucharest, Romania

Coordinates: 44°26′33″N 26°05′57″E

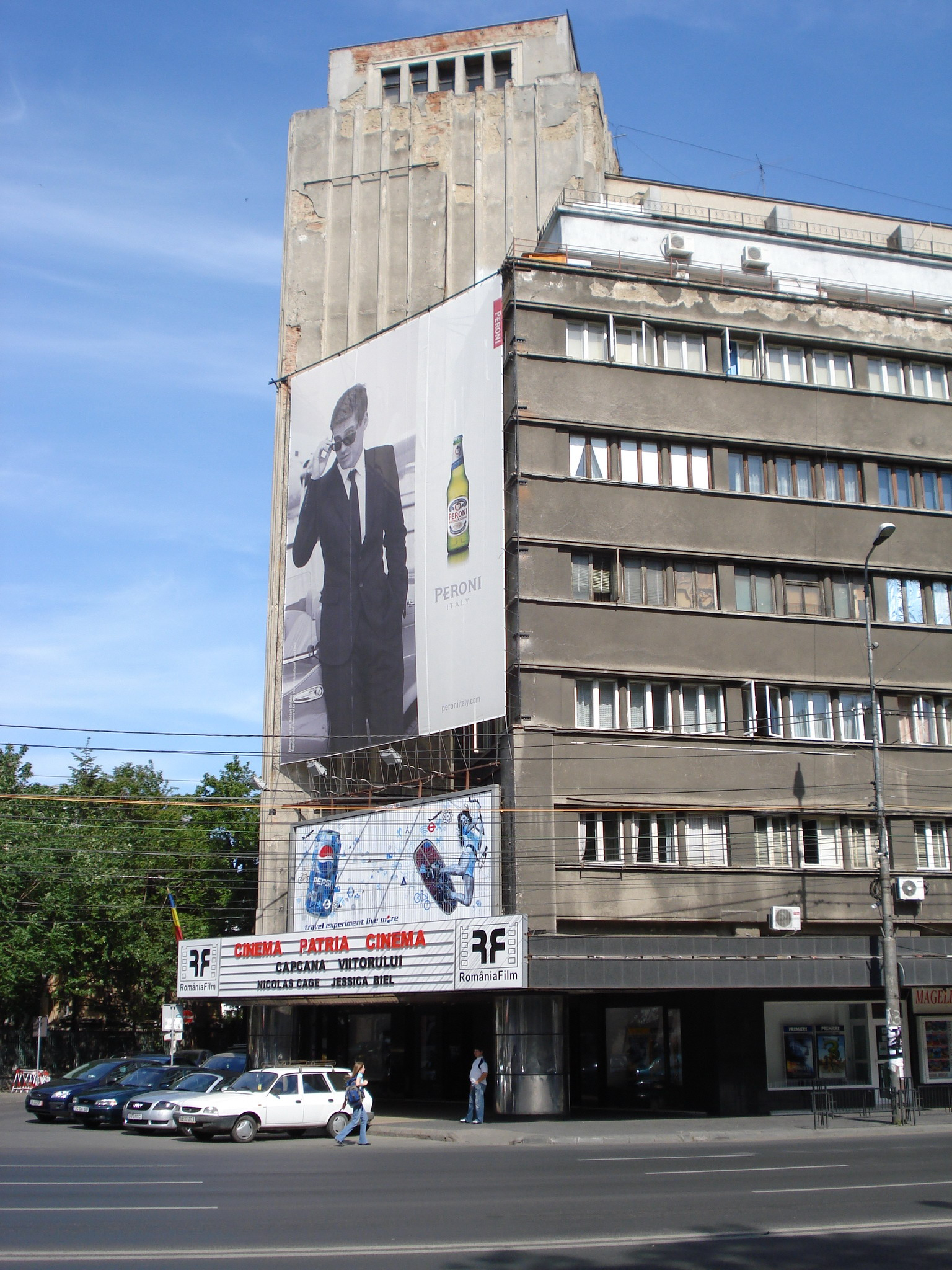
ARO building, with the Patria Cinema on the ground floor and apartments above

The Patria Cinema, located at 12-14 Bulevardul Magheru, was among the best-known movie theatres in Bucharest, Romania. It is housed in Horia Creangă's modernist 10-story ARO building (named after the insurance firm that had it built), designed in 1929 and completed in 1931. It was closed in November 2015, due to seismic risk.
