= Cezar Lăzărescu =

Romanian architect

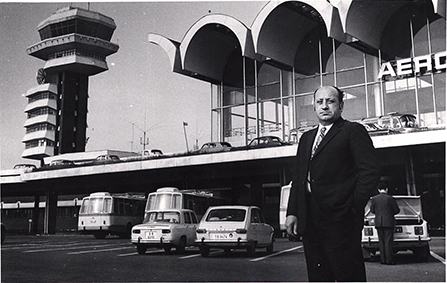
- Born: Cezar Lăzărescu; October 3, 1923; Bucharest, Kingdom of Romania
- Died: October 27, 1986 (aged 63); Bucharest, Socialist Republic of Romania
- Education: Ion Mincu University of Architecture and Urban Planning
- Occupation: Architect
- Spouse: Ileana Lăzărescu
- Children: 1
- Buildings: Bucharest Henri Coandă International Airport; National Theatre Bucharest

Cezar Lăzărescu (October 3, 1923 – November 27, 1986) was a Romanian architect and urban planner. Starting in the years after his graduation in 1952 and until after the 1977 Vrancea earthquake, he conceived a significant number of buildings and city plans in Romania and abroad.

== Biography ==
His father, Alexandru Lăzărescu, was an Army colonel, often on duty far from Bucharest; he was killed in action in December 1942 at the Battle of Stalingrad. His mother, Sophia Lăzărescu Georgescu, was a housewife. Having attended an art school herself, she also taught him how to draw and paint.

=== 1930–1956 : School years and first works ===
After attending a small public school, where the short illustrated fairy tale books he wrote brought him the admiration of his teachers and classmates, he was admitted to the Gheorghe Lazăr National College, one of the best high schools in Bucharest. Inspired by the exciting environment and the many extracurricular activities, he performed very well in school. He contributed to several art exhibitions organised by his high school and in 1942 opened his own exhibition at the Athenaeum, a prestigious venue.

Lăzărescu studied at the University of Architecture in Bucharest, graduating in 1948. His college years were over the background of World War II and the post-war era, during which he and his mother Sophia had to struggle to make ends meet. Nevertheless, he had remarkable academic achievements and was also involved in numerous extracurricular professional and social activities.

In the early 1950s he was drafted to the Danube–Black Sea Canal works, where he was put in charge of a team of young architects who were commissioned to design workers' lodgings close to Cernavodă, near the seaside. He worked next on healthcare facilities and holiday camps in North and South Eforie, on the shores of Lake Techirghiol, and in Mangalia.

Socialist realism, the mandatory architectural style for any public building of this period, led to the production of cheap-looking housing projects, decorated in a pompous faux-classical way that was meant to put on display the "luxurious life" of the working class. This architectural style (of which the Moscow State University and its clones such as the "Casa Scînteii" in Bucharest were prime examples) were mandated by law in all countries within the Eastern Bloc. Any public building or dwelling was required to be done in this style.

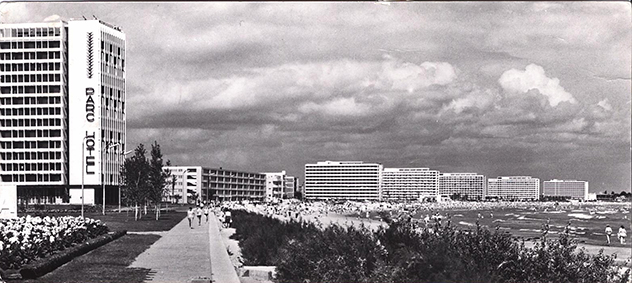
21 hotels and 8 restaurants, shops, bars and clubs in Mamaia

=== 1957–1961: Development of the Black Sea coast ===
The paid vacation time introduced by the "workers' union" gave rise to a pressing need to create, in just a few months' time, an impressive number of beds in tourist residences on the Black Sea coast. A local Party leader asked the team led by Lăzărescu to build a hotel complex for the "worker's union" in North Eforie by the beginning of the summer.

Faced with an apparently unsolvable problem (building over one thousand beds on an insufficient budget and within an unreasonably short time), with little "political oversight" (since the actual political battles are fought far away in Bucharest), Lăzărescu created, with his team, a vast building complex in a style reminiscent of American architecture, very far from the socialist realism required by law. An investigation followed, with the looming threat of a prison sentence. Along with the local Party leader, Lăzărescu was summoned to the office of the First Secretary of the Romanian Workers' Party, Gheorghe Gheorghiu-Dej. To Lăzărescu's surprise, Gheorghiu-Dej congratulated him, telling him how pleased he was with the result. Subsequently, Gheorghiu-Dej appointed Lăzărescu to lead the development of the Romanian Black Sea coast. This was to become the main building effort that would put an end to socialist realism.

In the following period, Lăzărescu developed the Southern coast in the areas of Eforie, Lake Techirghiol, and Mangalia (tourist residences and health facilities including balneotherapy), and the Northern seaside in the area of Mamaia (only tourist residences and entertainment). Sewage facilities, roads, and energy distribution networks in these areas were rudimentary at best, so the team needed to rebuild everything from scratch.

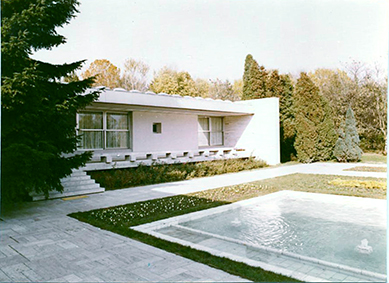
"Lake 2" villa in Bucharest Floreasca

The team led by Lăzărescu comprised many talented architects who would later become well known, such as A. Borgovan, V. Ghiorghiu, G. Cristea, D. Ghiorghiu, A. Coveianu, L. Popovici, T. Adam, V. Petrea, Stopler, and many others. Held together by the magnitude of the challenge and the largely shared vision of a modern architecture, the team created a number of remarkable buildings. Many of these have maintained their modern, almost minimalistic character even today, due to the purity of their shapes and the fluidity of the architectural expression. Examples include the "Perla Mării" restaurant, the vacation camps located between North and South Eforie, the "Melody" bar and casino, the Villa Marina, and others). The technical approach is as daring as the aesthetic one: Mamaia was built on a very low stretch of sand between the lake and the sea, which required building an innovative sewage system.

=== 1961–1965: Luxury villas ===
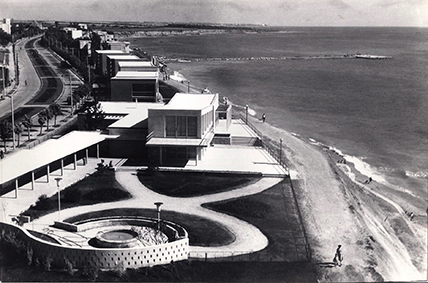
Three presidential villas in North Eforie

At the same time as the development of the Black Sea coast, Lăzărescu was put in charge of building luxury villas for the government, initially on the seaside, in North Eforie and Mamaia, later in Bucharest and in other parts of the country. These luxury villas were built with materials supplied by French and Italian companies such as Perrier-Rolin, Zilli, and Barovier & Toso in Murano. Along with the design of the Bucharest Henri Coandă International Airport, these were some of the few occasions on which Lăzărescu worked with his wife, Ileana Lăzărescu (who was also an architect), on interior decoration.

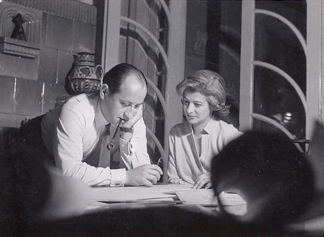
Lăzărescu and his wife Ileana

On the opposite end of the spectrum from the Socialist realism that represented Soviet domination, the influence of American architects Richard Neutra and Mies Van der Rohe can be felt in a number of buildings Lăzărescu designed in Bucharest, such as in the "Lake 1" and "Lake 2" villas. Additional style elements of these buildings stem from the commissioned requirements, the environment of the buildings, the influence of Romanian monastic architecture, Nordic Classicism, and Swiss architecture.

Several high-ranking Party officials commissioned Lăzărescu to build villas, and he fulfilled all of these requests enthusiastically except for one: the villa of Nicolae and Elena Ceaușescu, a request he turned down due to a feeling of aesthetic incompatibility with his patrons.

Gheorghiu-Dej treated him as a family member. When other Party officials objected that Lăzărescu's responsibilities were incompatible with the fact that he was not a member of the Communist Party (something plainly illegal in his position at that time), he answered: "Let him do his work. If he wants to, he'll do politics later." However, Lăzărescu never wanted to do politics.

=== 1965–1977: Beginning of the Ceaușescu period and significant buildings ===
Felled by aggressive lung cancer, Gheorghiu-Dej died in March 1965. At the time, Lăzărescu was traveling in France to place orders for building materials. He learned of the ascent to power of Nicolae Ceaușescu and, despite warnings from friends in France, returned to Bucharest. Arriving home, he was viewed as an enemy of the people for having wasted the country's money on luxury dwellings and was threatened with legal action. Like others who had been close to Gheorghiu-Dej, he was blacklisted by Ceaușescu, who had not yet digested Lăzărescu's refusal to build his villa.

In 1968 he was asked to submit a proposal to a contest for the Otopeni Airport, after Ceaușescu dismissed the initial submissions from the other competitors. Lăzărescu won the contest and built the airport.

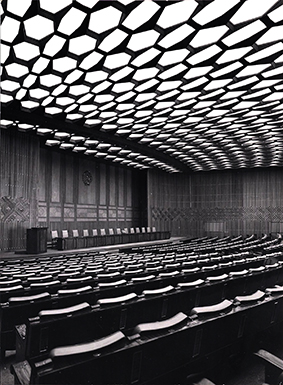
Conference hall "Omnia", extension of the Communist Party headquarters

Following this, he built numerous other significant buildings in Romania, including the Palace of Sports in Bucharest, the "Omnia" conference venue next to the Communist Party headquarters in Bucharest, a reception hall for the French embassy in Bucharest, and abroad, the Romanian embassy in Beijing and the Parliament building in Khartoum.

He was appointed rector of the Ion Mincu University of Architecture and Urban Planning in 1970 (for two consecutive terms) and a year later President of the Romanian Architects' Union.

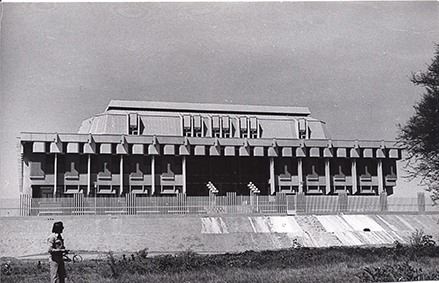
Parliament of Sudan in Khartoum

The works he completed are significant, but his refusal was heard: other architects designed the private lodgings of Nicolae and Elena Ceaușescu. Lăzărescu kept an official tone in his relationship with the Ceaușescus. They respected his professionalism and he paid them the respect due patrons.

In 1971 he was awarded the Order of the Star of the Romanian Socialist Republic, 2nd class.

=== 1977–1982: Restructuring of Bucharest by Ceaușescu and the National Theatre ===
The relationship with Ceaușescu started deteriorating after the 1977 Vrancea earthquake. Ceaușescu dug up some city restructuring plans that had been ordered by King Carol II of Romania around 1940. He made them his own, and envisioned a restructuring program in the style of Baron Haussmann, with a new downtown comprising housing, ministries, an opera, a museum, a hotel, and a Palace of the Parliament. Studies were drafted by several architectural teams. Ceaușescu asked Lăzărescu to build the new headquarters of the Romanian Communist Party and of the Romanian government, to match the function of the current buildings.

Ceaușescu relentlessly, repeatedly asked for changes to the plans, and wanted to reduce the number of social and cultural buildings—in the end, only wanting the policial center, a ministry, and some housing. All the submissions to the contest stuck to these requirements, save for the one by the "youth team" led by the architect Anca Petrescu, who proposed a pyramid-shaped building reminiscent of the Mont Saint-Michel, without a clearly defined program. After Lăzărescu refused for a second time to create a similar proposal (he argued that he was unable to design a building just for the sake of its image, but without a program), he was removed from the contest.

Lăzărescu was appointed to lead the remodelling of the National Theatre, a building that had been erected during the period 1964–1973 by the architects Horia Maicu, Romeo Belea, and Nicolae Cucu. Lăzărescu's appointment to this project was a punishment for him having refused to overbid on the Palace of the Parliament, Ceaușescu being well-aware of the tensions he was causing between fellow architects. Towards the second half of the work, Lăzărescu was no longer invited to join Ceaușescu's visits to the building site, the latter's requests for changes being passed on by his counsellors. This was the period during which Ceaușescu's circle of counselors surrounded the presidential family, in order to distort information according to its interests, and eventually to suppress them entirely.

=== 1982–1986: Construction of the National Library (unfinished) ===
The last project that Lăzărescu was appointed to was the construction of the National Library, a building that was left unfinished at the time he died on November 27, 1986, after lying in a coma for a month.

== Works ==
=== Architecture ===
- 1949 : Administrative headquarters for the Hunedoara steel works
- 1949 : Lodging complex for steelworkers in Hunedoara
- 1950 : Technical high school, 24 classrooms and workshops in Hunedoara
- 1951 : Four subsidised housing buildings for workers at Electroputere in Craiova
- 1951 : Remodelling of the headquarters of the State Planning Council
- 1951 : Subsidised housing comprising 86 apartments in Medgidia
- 1951 : Remodelling of the headquarters of the Romanian Composers' Union in Bucharest
- 1952 : Subsidised housing comprising 140 apartments in Medgidia
- 1952 : Lodging complex for workers in Baia Mare
- 1954 : Main building for the Dinamo Bucharest sports club
- 1955 : Army buildings in Dobruja
- 1956 : Buildings for the Ministry of the Interior in Bucharest
- 1957 : Balneotherapy building complex in South Eforie
- 1957 : Restaurant planning of the coast strip at North Eforie
- 1957 : Hotel with 200 beds in North Eforie
- 1957 : 8 villas in South Eforie
- 1957 : Hotel "Albatross" and "Mamaia" restaurant
- 1957 : Vacation camp for 200 children in North Eforie
- 1958 : 3 villas in Mangalia
- 1958 : Vacation camp for 600 children in South Eforie
- 1958 : Seaside bar and restaurant in North Eforie
- 1958 : 9 government villas in North Eforie
- 1958 : Hotels (1,600 beds) and restaurants in North Eforie
- 1958 : Hotels (1,200 beds), shops and restaurants in Mangalia
- 1958 : 3 presidential villas in North Eforie
- 1959 : 3 medical homes with 600 beds, restaurant and club in Mangalia
- 1959 : Hotels (2,000 beds), shops, movie theatre and restaurants in North Eforie
- 1959 : Balneotherapy building complex on Lake Techirghiol
- 1959 : Sanatorium and 500-bed clinic in Mangalia
- 1959 : Vacation camp in Mamaia
- 1959 : Headquarters of the People's Council of the city of Mangalia
- 1959 : Sanatorium for children suffering for tuberculosis (600 beds) in Mangalia
- 1960 : 21 hotels (10,000 beds) and 8 restaurants, shops, bars and clubs in Mamaia
- 1960 : Staff housing in North Eforie
- 1961 : Building for the staff of the government villas in North Eforie
- 1962 : Presidential villa for foreign dignitaries "Lake 1" in Floreasca district of Bucharest
- 1963 : 5 government villas with private movie theaters and swimming pools in Bucharest
- 1964 : Presidential villa with private movie theater and swimming pool in the Floreasca district of Bucharest
- 1964 : Presidential villa with private movie theater in Timișul de Jos
- 1965 : Presidential villa for foreign dignitaries in Snagov
- 1965 : Villa for dignitaries of the Romanian Communist Party in Snagov
- 1965 : Hotel (50 beds) for dignitaries of the Romanian Communist Party in Snagov
- 1965 : Government villa in Craiova
- 1966 : Hotel Europe in North Eforie
- 1966 : Presidential villa "Marina" in Mamaia
- 1967 : Reception and formal dining hall in North Mangalia
- 1967 : "Omnia" conference hall, an addition to the Romanian Communist Party headquarters in Bucharest
- 1969 : Hotel (50 beds) and restaurant in Pitești
- 1969 : Administrative and political headquarters in Pitești
- 1969 : Administrative and political headquarters in Focșani
- 1969 : Government train remodelling, 24 cars
- 1969 : Government yacht, remodelling and decoration
- 1970 : Cultural hall (800 seats) in Pitești
- 1970 : Bucharest Henri Coandă International Airport in Otopeni
- 1970 : Sports center (12,000 seats) in Bucharest
- 1970 : Buildings for the National Institute for Physics and Nuclear Engineering in Măgurele
- 1971 : Extension of the Politehnica University of Bucharest School of Construction buildings
- 1974 : Sports palace (8,000 seats) in Bucharest
- 1974 : Hotel in Predeal
- 1975 : Buildings in Libya
- 1976 : President's palace in Monrovia, Liberia (draft)
- 1977 : Romanian embassy in Beijing
- 1977 : Sudanese parliament building in Khartoum
- 1977 : Presidential palace in Khartoum (draft)
- 1979 : Chinese embassy building in Bucharest
- 1979 : Conference hall for the French embassy in Bucharest
- 1980 : TV tower in Bucharest (draft)
- 1982 : Remodelling of the National Theatre in Bucharest
- 1984 : Construction of the National Library in Bucharest (unfinished)

=== Urban planning ===
- 1952 : Urban planning for the town of Cernavodă
- 1952 : Urban planning for the town of Poarta Albă
- 1952 : Urban planning for the town of Năvodari
- 1954 : Urban planning for the town of Constanța
- 1957 : Urban planning for the Black Sea coast
- 1958 : Urban planning for the town of Vasile Roaită (South Eforie)
- 1958 : Urban planning for the town of North Eforie
- 1967 : Urban planning for the city of Pitești
- 1969 : Campus of the National Institute for Physics and Nuclear Engineering in Măgurele
- 1977 : Urban planning for the town of Zimnicea

== Publications ==
- The architect's book Volume 1, Editura Tehnică București, 1954 (collaboration).
- Urban planning: conception and implementation, regulations and principles, Editura Tehnică București, 1956.
- Contemporary challenges with building hotels in our country, PhD thesis.
- Raw concrete, Editura Tehnică București, 1969.
- Hotel buildings, Editura Tehnică București, 1971.
- Architecting modern tourism buildings in Romania, Editura Meridiane, 1972.
- Romanian architecture in pictures, Editura Meridiane, 1973.
- Contemporary architecture in Romania, Editura Meridiane, 1973.
- City planning in Romania, Editura Tehnică București, 1977.
- The architecture and life of cities, Editura Tehnică București, 1986 read online.

== See also ==
- Biography of Cezar Lăzărescu written by his wife, Ileana Lăzărescu: Vise in piatră. In memoria profesorului doctor arhitect Cezar Lăzărescu, Editura Capitel, 2003, ISBN 973 85523 5 4.
- Mamaia at 90°, Ziua de Constanța, August 13, 2012 (in Romanian).
- Radu-Alexandra Răuță: "Shifting meanings of modernism: parallels and contrasts between Karel Teige and Cezar Lăzărescu" in: The journal of architecture, Royal Institute of British Architects. – Bd. 14.2009, 1, S. 27–44.
