= Bucharest Observatory =

Heritage site in Bucharest, Romania

Coordinates: 44°26′55″N 26°05′35″E

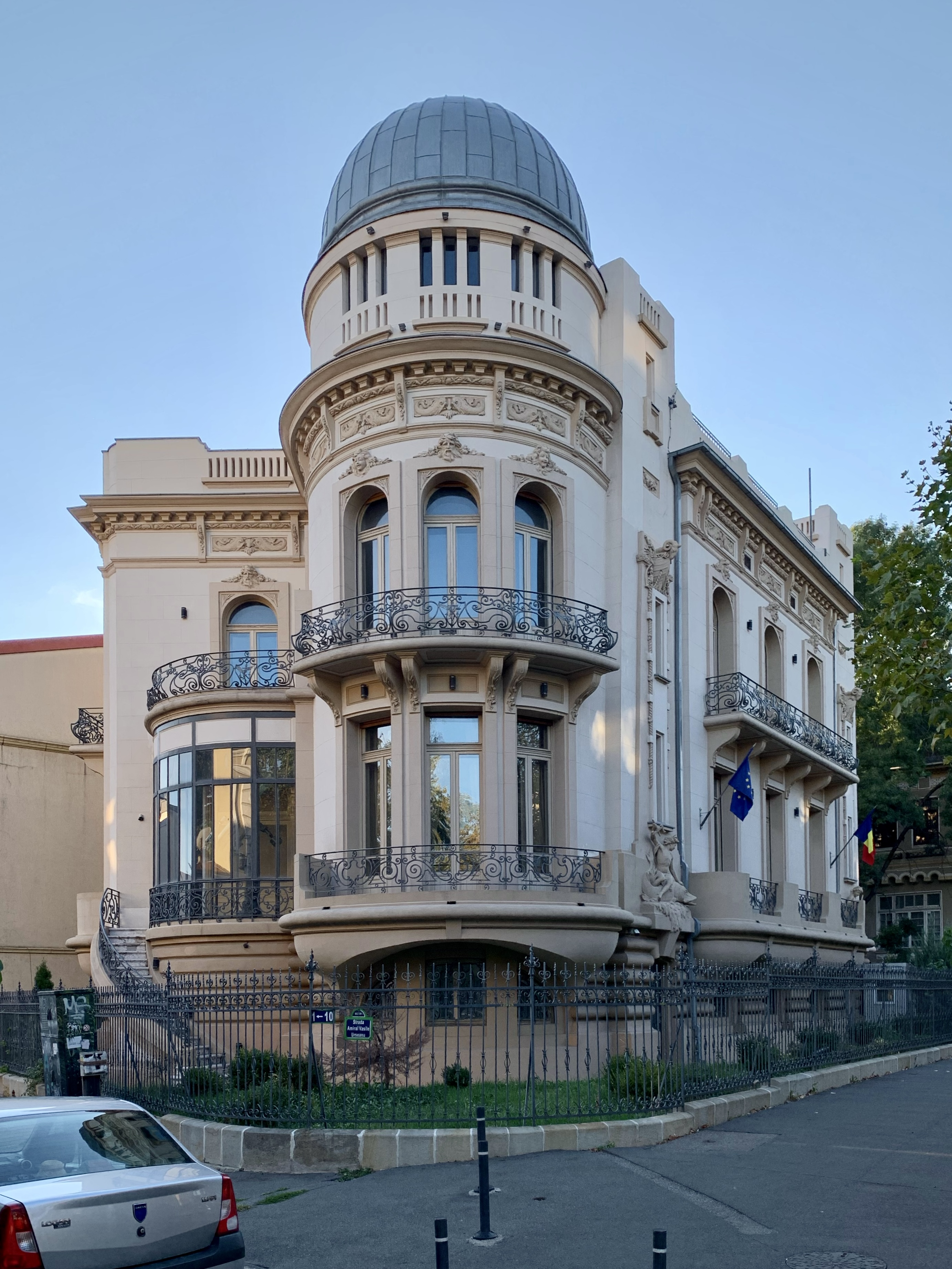
Bucharest Observatory in September 2022

The Bucharest Observatory is an astronomical observatory located at no. 21 Lascăr Catargiu Boulevard, Bucharest, Romania. It is Bucharest's only observatory open to the public.

== History ==
The observatory was built between 1908 and 1910, for Admiral Vasile Urseanu, president of the Romanian Astronomical Society "Camille Flammarion". It was equipped with a 150 mm diameter Zeiss telescope with a focal length of 2.7 meters; the telescope was the third largest in Romania at the time. Ion D. Berindey was the architect.

The observatory founded by Urseanu was frequented by amateur astronomers; professional researchers worked at the Bucharest Astronomical Observatory, founded by Nicolae Coculescu and located on Filaret Hill in Carol Park. Following the death of Admiral Urseanu in 1926, the telescope was dismantled and stored in the basement of the building. In 1933, Urseanu's widow donated the building to the municipality of Bucharest, which used it as a pinacotheca. In 1949, the paintings were transferred to other museums. In April 1950, the telescope was relocated to the dome, and the building returned to its original purpose as an astronomical observatory. In 1990, the observatory was dedicated to its founder and took the name Astronomical Observatory Admiral Vasile Urseanu.

The Urseanu House is listed as a historic monument by Romania's Ministry of Culture and Religious Affairs.

== See also ==
- Astronomical Institute of the Romanian Academy
