= Constantin David (activist) =

Romanian trade unionist

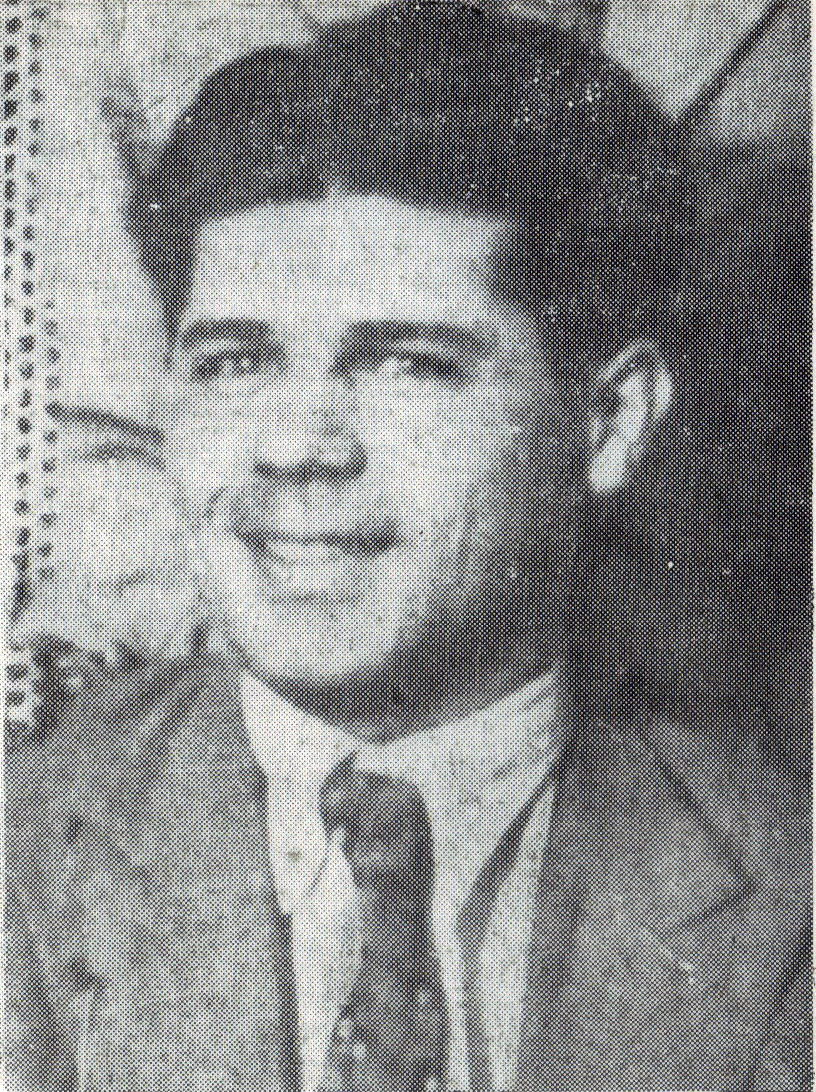
Constantin David

Constantin "Tică" David (April 25, 1908 – January 21, 1941) was a Romanian communist activist and anti-fascist militant assassinated by the fascist Iron Guard during the Legionnaires' rebellion.

== Biography ==
Born in a working-class family in Bucharest, Romania's capital, Constantin David spent his childhood near the Grivița Railway Yards, an important centre of the workers' movement. Beginning his apprenticeship at the Yards as a lathe operator in his early teens, he became acquainted early on with the clandestine communist groups. Having joined the Union of Communist Youth, in 1933 he was mobilising workers in support of the Grivița strike when he was arrested and imprisoned for 6 months at Jilava for his activism. His political options would eventually lead to a total of 24 arrests between 1931 and 1940.

Accepted into the illegal Communist Party of Romania (PCR), David became involved in the various anti-fascists activities organised by the party or its various front organisations, also having significant contributions to the gathering of aid for the imprisoned political prisoners. Active primarily among the youth, in 1934 he helped organise a cinema on Calea Griviței, which also served as a meeting place for the militants attempting to counter the growing influence of the Iron Guard. Together with Ilie Pintilie, he worked towards creating a United Workers Front, reuniting communists, socialists and social-democrats, as well as an anti-fascist Popular front. A member of the State Railways union, David served as the Grivița delegate to the country-wide congress of the General Union of Railways Trade Unions, held in July 1936 in Brașov. Doing support work for the PCR during the various political trials held in 1935–1936, he was himself sentenced to 6 months in prison for contempt of court following his deposition as a witness in the 1936 Craiova Trial, held before the War Council of the Romanian First Army.

Set free, in 1937 David joined the clandestine Central Committee of the PCR and was appointed in the leadership of the Bucharest local committee. Soon after he was fired from the railways yards and blacklisted at the request of the Siguranța, Romania's secret police. Nevertheless, he succeeded in maintaining contacts with the workers both in Bucharest and across the country. After the arrest of Ilie Pintilie, David assumed his role as contact between the PCR and the trade unions in the railway company. At the behest of the party, he continued his work in the corporatist guilds, created after the dissolution of trade unions by the authoritarian regime of Carol II. In spite the official government policy of class collaboration, the local committee of the PCR succeeded in organising several strikes (most notably the six-week-long strike at the Goldenberg nails manufacturing plant). Along with Nicolae Ceaușescu, Teohari Georgescu, Alexandru Iliescu, and Pintilie, he coordinated party propaganda during the government-sanctioned May Day festivities in 1939. Under constant surveillance by the Siguranța, David was dispatched in January 1939 to Galați to work in the PCR's Lower Danube regional committee. Although legally employed as a welder at the local shipyard, the Siguranța was able to identify him and in January 1940 the authorities sent him to Bucharest, putting him under mandatory residence. Nevertheless, David re-established contact with the Grivița party cell and in the summer of 1940 he was appointed to the PCR's Prahova Valley regional committee. In order to continue his political work and at the same time abide by the administrative decision regarding his residence, he commuted almost daily to Ploiești, the headquarters of the regional committee.

With the installation of an undisguised fascist regime headed by Ion Antonescu and the Iron Guard in September 1940, David's activity in the Prahova Valley came under the scrutiny of the new authorities. In October, Constantin Petrovicescu, the Minister of Interior, personally requested that the Bucharest Police Office intensify the surveillance of Constantin David. Moreover, his name was placed on the list of people to be eliminated by Iron Guard death squads. In spite of the conditions, David continued his activism, most notably participating in the major anti-fascist demonstration organised by Miron Constantinescu in the Obor neighbourhood of Bucharest on November 3, 1940. On the night of January 20/21, 1941, during the Legionnaires' rebellion, David was kidnapped from his home by an Iron Guard squad and brought to the Bucharest Police Headquarters, where he was severely beaten and ultimately assassinated. According to the deposition of one of the squad members, he was brought by car near Pantelimon, brought out in a field and, after refusing to divulge information regarding the communist organisations, shot in the head at point blank. His body, severely mutilated, with the left arm torn out, was found only four weeks later.

After the PCR came to power in the late 1940s, Constantin David was hailed as a hero of the working class, and his remains were moved to the Liberty Park mausoleum, where they stood until removed in the aftermath of the 1989 Romanian Revolution. His assassination was dramatised in Sergiu Nicolaescu's 1978 film Revanșa, with David played by Iurie Darie.

A cinema bearing his name was opened in Crângași district of Bucharest in December 1951, using equipment manufactured by Tehnocin Factory. The cinema was renamed to Crîngași in late 1963 and demolished in the 1980s.
