= Teohari =

Teohari is a Romanian name that may refer to:

== Surname ==
- Claudiu Teohari (born 1981), Romanian stand up-comedian, writer, and actor
- Maria Teohari (1885–1975), Romanian astronomer

== Given name ==
- Teohari Antonescu (1866–1910), archaeologist
- Teohari Georgescu (1908–1976), member of the Romanian Communist Party
