= Bulevardul Lascăr Catargiu =

Major street in Bucharest, Romania

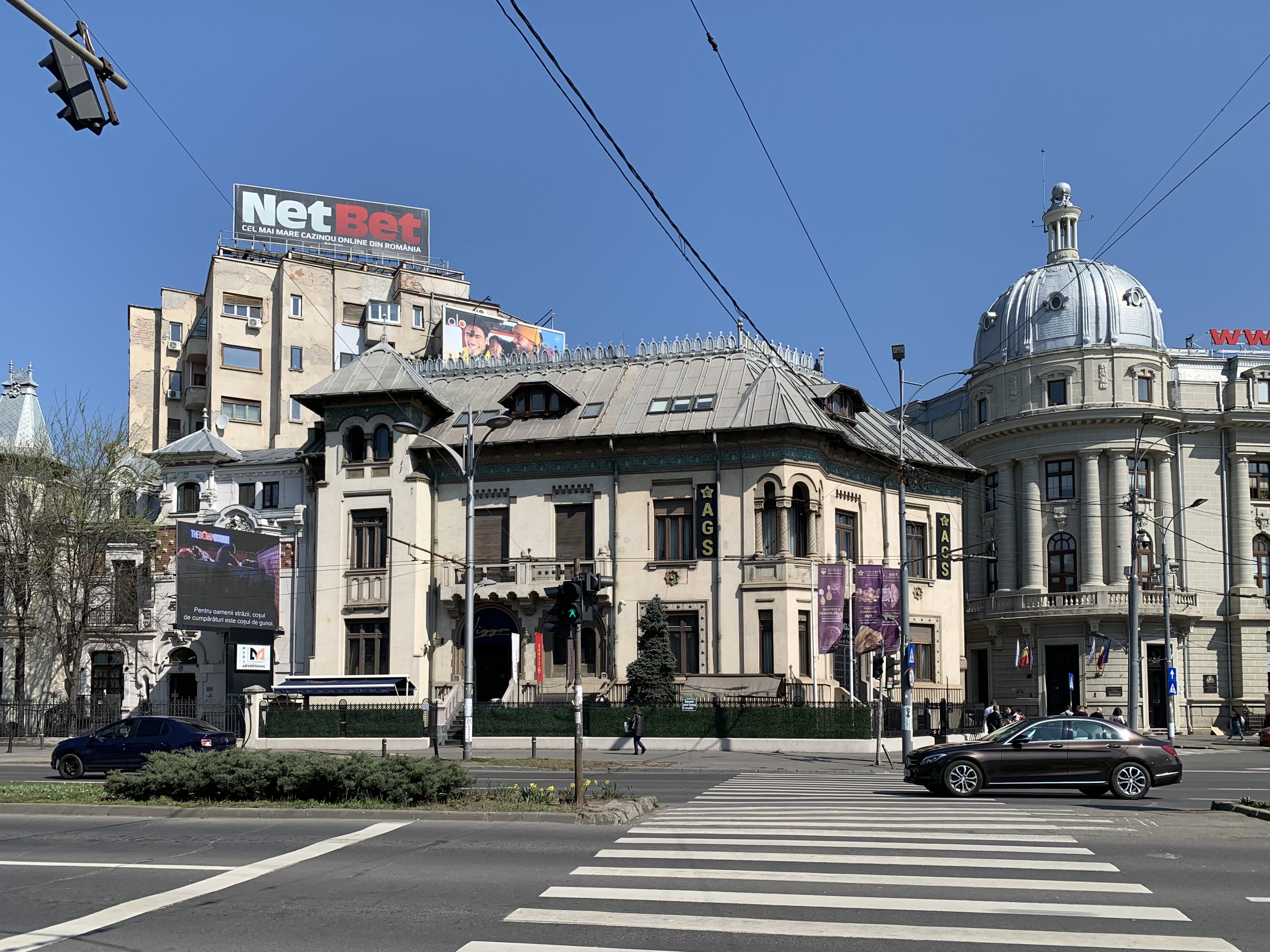
- Eastern end of the Bulevardul Lascăr Catargiu, facing the House of Gheorghe Petrașcu
- Interactive map of Bulevardul Lascăr Catargiu
- Former names: Colței, Ana Ipătescu
- Length: 2 km (1.2 mi)
- Location: Bucharest, Romania
- Nearest metro station: Piața Romană; Piața Victoriei
- Coordinates: 44°26′57.7″N 26°5′31.2″E
- South end: Piața Romană
- North end: Victory Square

Bulevardul Lascăr Catargiu is a major thoroughfare in Sector 1 of Bucharest, Romania, linking Victory Square with Piața Romană.

Originally, the boulevard was part of Strada Colței, a longer road that also included today's Magheru, Nicolae Bălcescu, and Ion C. Brătianu Boulevards. In the early 20th century, it was named after the politician Lascăr Catargiu, whose statue was placed near the southern end. Under the communist regime, it bore the name of Ana Ipătescu, reverting to Lascăr Catargiu after the Romanian Revolution.

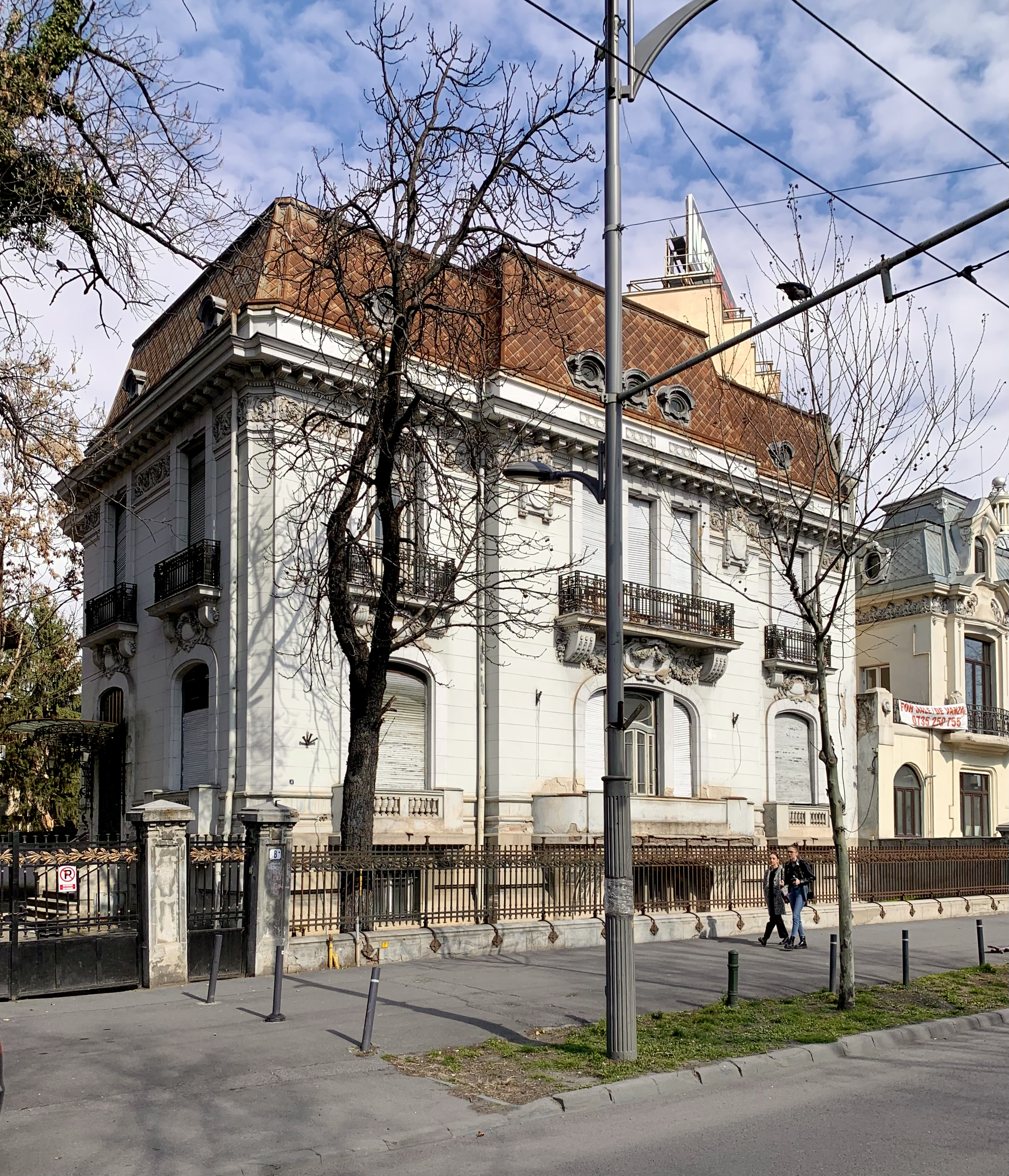
Dimitrie Bălescu House

The boulevard is listed as a historic monument by Romania's Ministry of Culture and Religious Affairs, as are twelve houses located along its course:

- Gheorghe Petrașcu House, at corner with Piața Romană
- Dimitrie Bălescu House, at No. 8
- Dinu Lipatti House, at No. 12
- General Eraclie Arion House, at No. 15
- Bucharest Observatory (Admiral Vasile Urseanu House), at No. 21
- Henri Coandă House, at No. 29
- Ion Cămărășescu House, at No. 39
- Gheorghe Dobrovici House, at No. 40
- Dimitrie Mavrodin House, at No. 50
- Engineer Constantin Vasilescu House, at No. 54
- House at No. 56
- Nicolae Petrescu-Comnen House, at No. 58

Other notable structures along the boulevard are: the Anagnostiade House, the Alexandru Gr. Ionescu House, the Nicolae Gheorghiu House, the Papazoglu House, the George G. Verona villa, the Alexandru and Lucreția Alexandrescu Building, and the Băicoianu Building.

The statue of Catargiu, built by sculptor Antonin Mercié in 1907, lies at the intersection of the boulevard with Viișoarei and Povernei streets. In 1957, the Communist authorities brought down the statue and stored it next to Casa Scînteii; it was restored in its current location in 2011.

== Notes ==
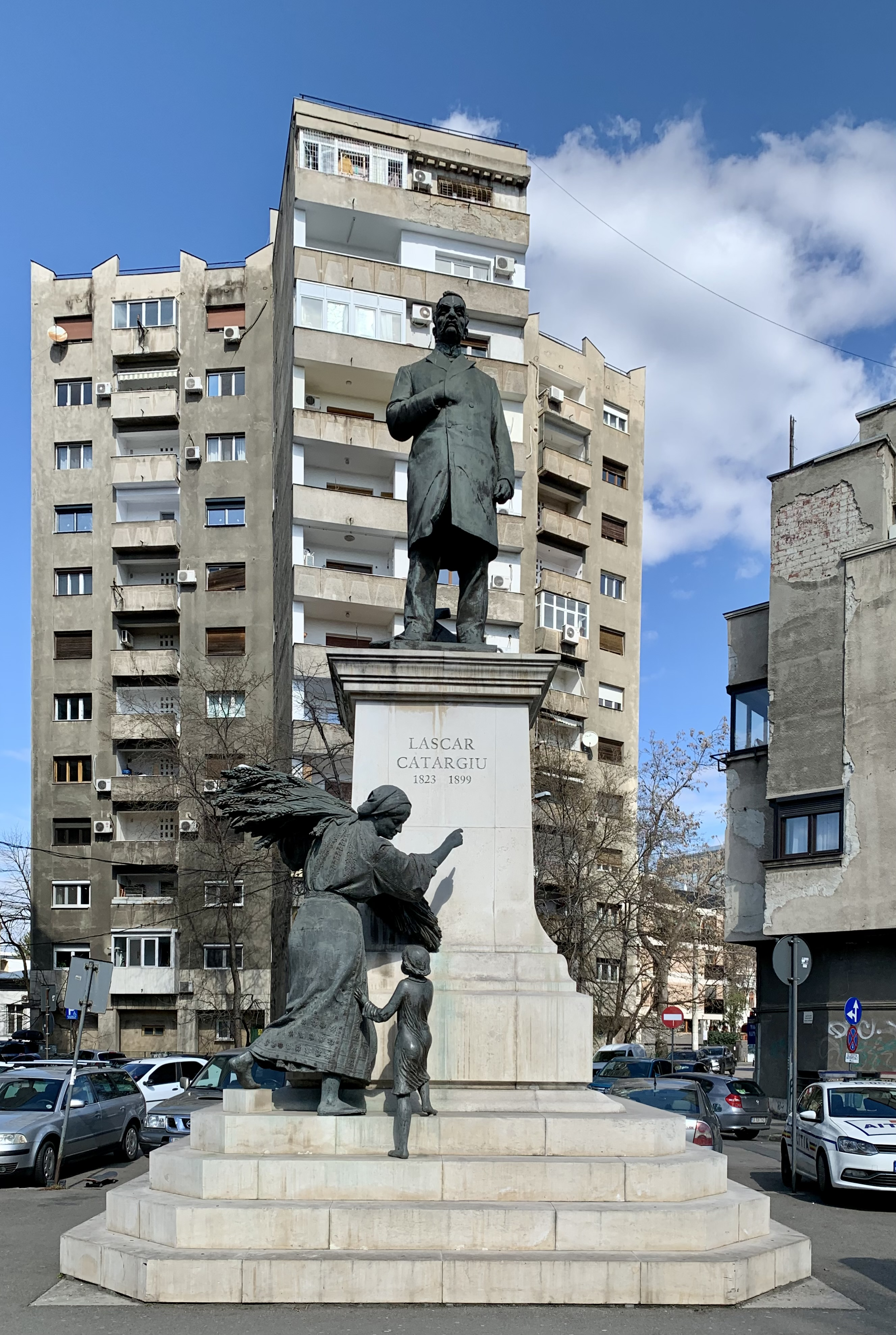
Statue of Lascăr Catargiu on the boulevard

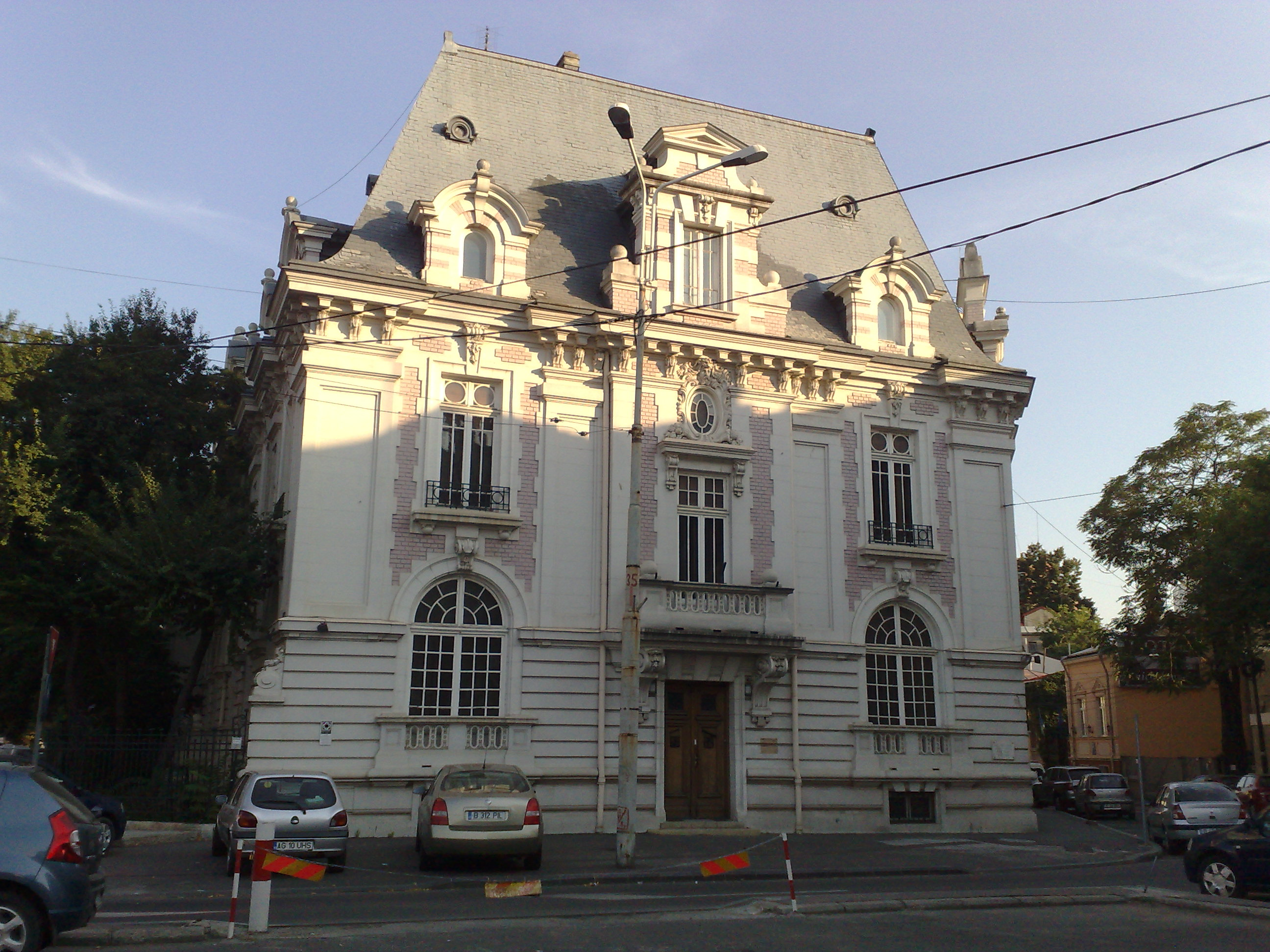
Henri Coandă House, at 29 Lascăr Catargiu Boulevard

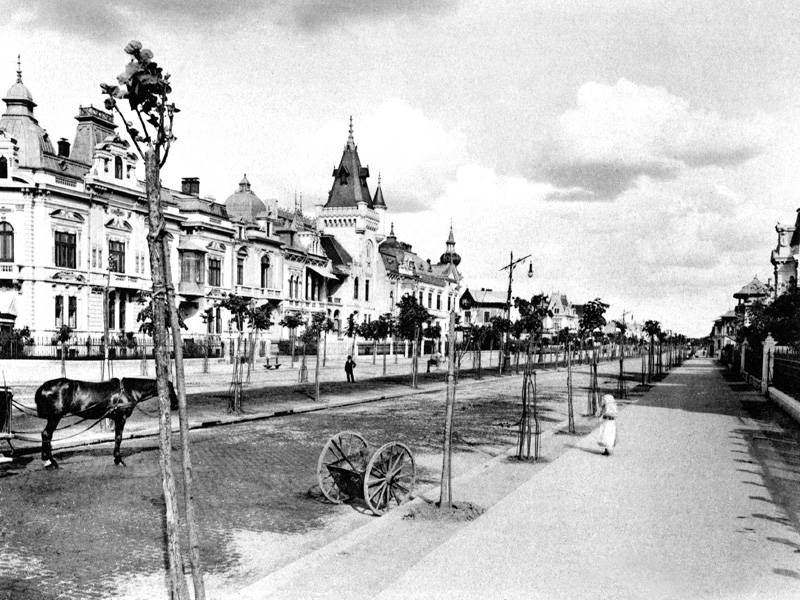
Colței Boulevard, c. 1901–1904

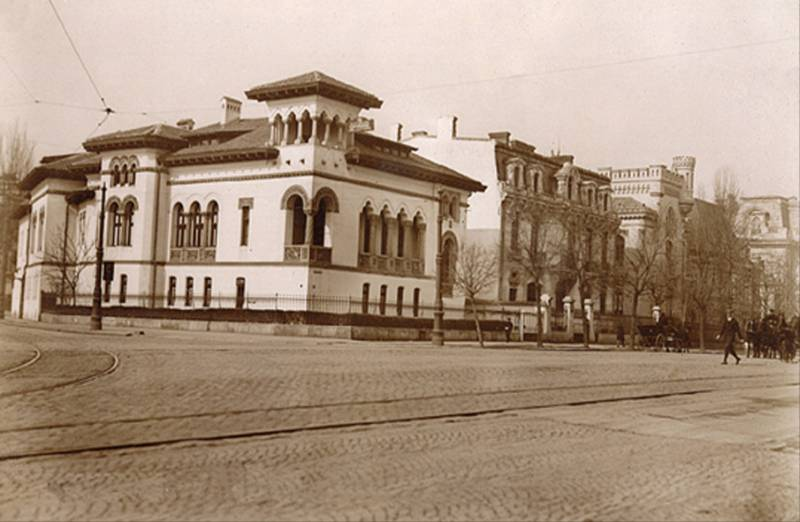
Intersection of Lascăr Catargiu Boulevard with Gheorghe Manu Street, interwar period
