= Bucharest Chamber of Commerce Palace =

Romanian building

Coordinates: 44.4334°N 26.1006°E

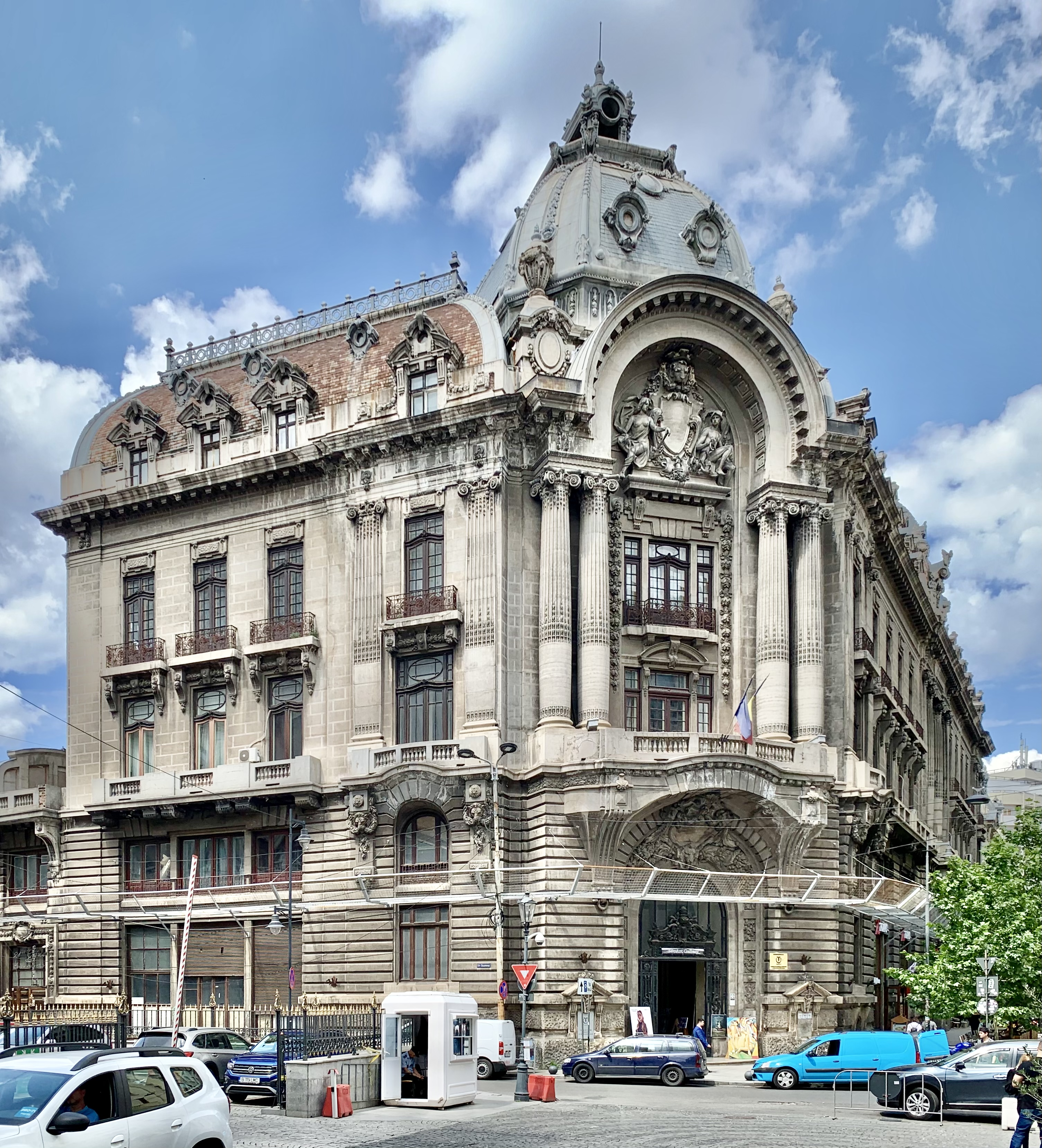
Bucharest Chamber of Commerce Palace

The Bucharest Chamber of Commerce Palace (Romanian: Palatul Camerei de Comerț București), also the Stock Exchange Palace (Palatul Bursei), is a building located at 4 Ion Ghica Street, Bucharest, Romania.

In 1904, the head of the Bucharest Chamber of Commerce asked King Carol I for land on which to build a headquarters. He was granted a parcel in 1906 from the state's holdings. Fourteen architects submitted designs in 1907; Ștefan Burcuș was selected. Special brick and reinforced concrete were used in order to ensure the building's stability; Gogu Constantinescu supervised the latter material. The cost was estimated at 800,000 gold lei. The cornerstone was laid in May 1908, in the presence of various officials. The palace was inaugurated in 1911, with a speech by the King. It was used as a stock market for goods. In 1949, the nascent communist regime nationalized the building. It hosted the National Library of Romania until 2008, when the Chamber of Commerce regained possession.

The building has two tall floors, an attic and a basement, measuring 1957 square meters in total. Described by one observer as featuring “a simple, beautiful majesty, with a grandiose facade, classical and alive”, it is richly decorated, with a rounded front, interrupted corniches and a skylit mansard. Its principal element is the main entrance on the street corner, with its curved balcony topped by a central arch. A blazon has a lion's head in bas-relief, flanked by two allegories in ronde-bosse stone: Industry on the left (a veiled woman holding a hammer) and Commerce on the right (Mercury holding a caduceus and an anchor). The first two floors are in bossage, while the remainder has pilasters and Ionic capitals. The style becomes finer as it climbs from the massive stone foundation to the cast-iron balustrades of the balconies. The ceiling and panels of the council chamber are decorated in the style of François Boucher. The Chamber of Commerce seal appears on the exterior and interior.

The building is listed as a historic monument by Romania's Ministry of Culture and Religious Affairs.
