= Ana Ipătescu =

Romanian revolutionary (1805–1875)

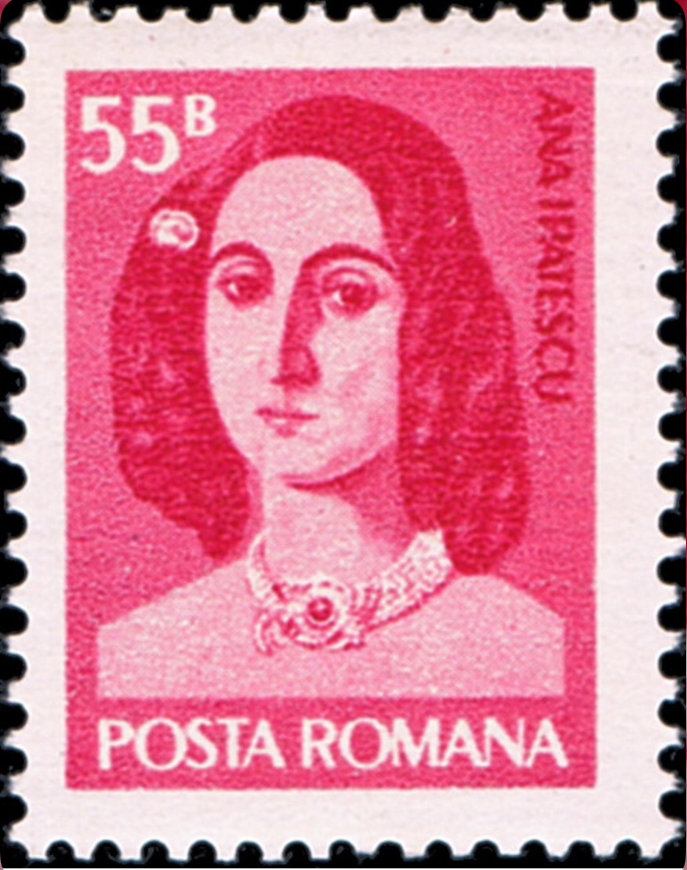
- Ipătescu on a 1975 postage stamp
- Born: 1805; Bucharest, Wallachia
- Died: 13 March 1875 (aged 69–70); Bucharest, Romania
- Occupation: revolutionary

Ana Ipătescu (1805–1875) was a Romanian revolutionary who participated in the Wallachian Revolution of 1848.

== Biography ==
Ana was born in Bucharest, in the Olarilor slum, in the family of a merchant, Atanasie Ghiulerasă, from the incipient bourgeoisie at the end of the Phanariot period. In 1828 she married the tenant Ivancea Dimitrie, from whom she divorced in 1831, in the same year her father died. Due to this situation she had an arranged marriage with Nicolae Ipătescu. Thanks to her husband, a clerk in the Treasury Department, she attended meetings of the Brotherhood secret society, where she met some of the leaders who would enter the revolutionary government after the revolution broke out on June 9, 1848. She participated directly in the revolution and led the pro-revolutionary crowds to liberate the revolutionary government members that were arrested on June 19, 1848 because of a counter-revolutionary conspiracy.

She died in 1875. Although she had wanted to be buried at Pasărea Monastery, her grave has yet to be identified.

An important boulevard in Bucharest was named after Ipătescu under the communist regime, although Ipătescu had no ties to communism. Shortly after the Romanian Revolution, its previous name of Lascăr Catargiu was restored.
