= Tomb of the Unknown Soldier (Romania) =

War memorial in Bucharest

- Romania
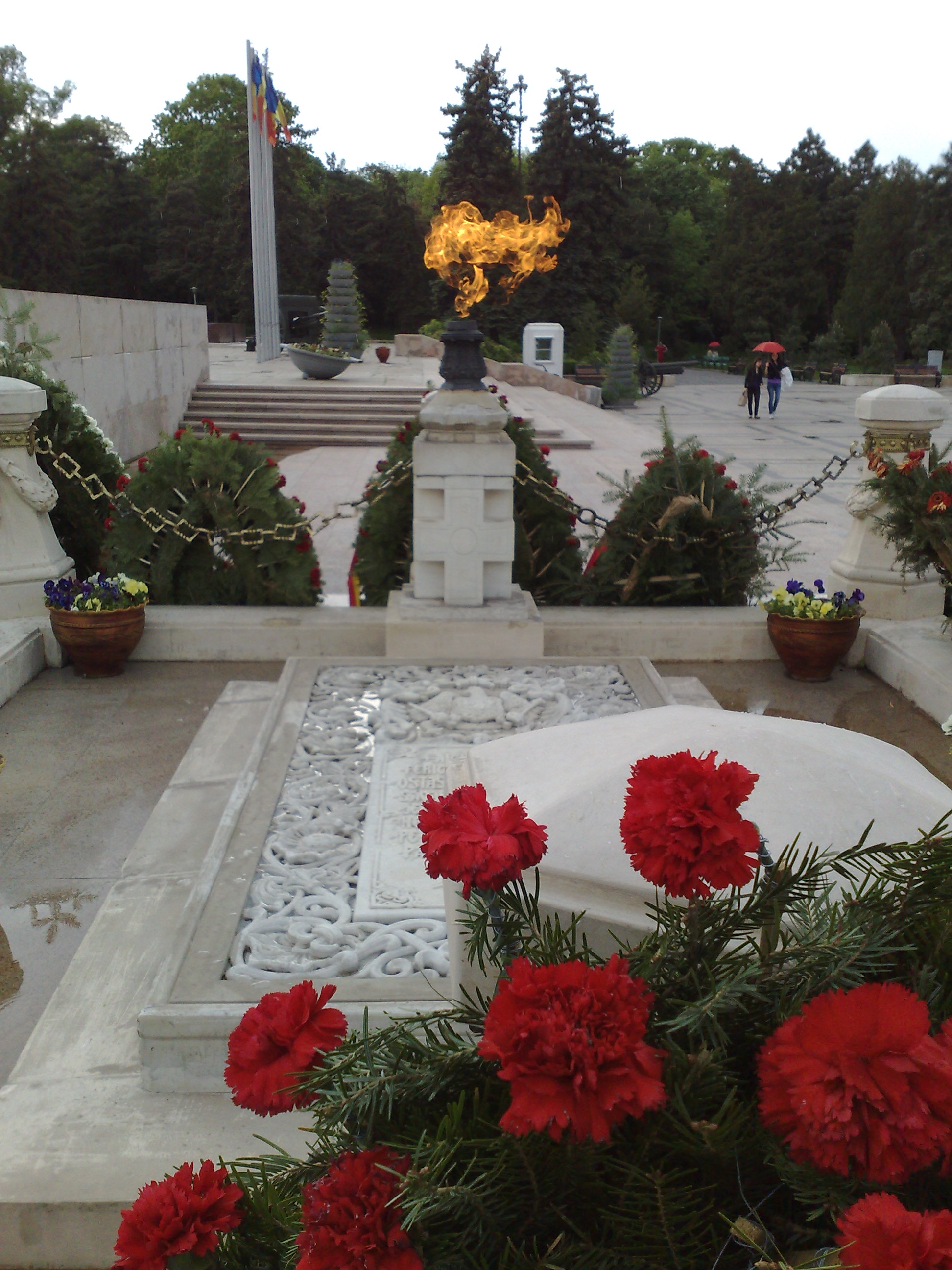
- For the Heroes of World War I
- Unveiled: 17 May 1923
- Location: 44°24′40.66″N 26°5′48.31″E
- Designed by: Lidia Kotzebuie
- Total burials: 1
- Unknowns: 1

Burials by war
- World War I

The Tomb of the Unknown Soldier (Romanian: Mormântul Soldatului Necunoscut) is a monument located in Bucharest, Romania. Dedicated to the soldiers who died while fighting for Romania, it is one of many such national tombs across the world.

The monument was built in 1923 to commemorate Romanian soldiers who died during World War I.

== History ==
In 1923 it was decided to choose one of the fallen soldiers to represent all who had sacrificed their lives during the war.

The order no. 567/1 May 1923 of the Ministry of War ruled that a war orphan in the 1st grade of a military school would choose the coffin of the Unknown Soldier. The military schools in Iași, Craiova, Chișinău and Dealu Monastery submitted the names of their best students who met the respective criteria. Out of the four candidates the war orphan Amilcar Săndulescu, a 12-year student at the Dimitrie Sturdza Military High School in Craiova (nowadays "Tudor Vladimirescu" Military College), whose father died on the front in 1917, was selected.

Ten unidentified soldiers who died at Mărășești, Mărăști, Oituz, Târgu Ocna, Jiu, Prahova, Bucharest, in Dobruja, Transylvania and Bessarabia were exhumed and laid in oak coffins, doubled with zinc, inside the "Assumption of Mary" Church in Mărășești.

On May 14, 1923, during the solemn ceremony organized at Mărășești, Amilcar Săndulescu knelt in front of the fourth coffin and said: "This is my father". After the Unknown Soldier had been chosen, the other nine coffins were buried with military honors in the Heroes' Cemetery in Mărășești.

On May 15, 1923, the Unknown Soldier's coffin, wrapped in a Romanian Tricolor, was placed on board of a special train to Bucharest, where it was waited for by the King Ferdinand, state officials and an honor guard. Laid on a cannon carriage pulled by eight horses, the coffin was transported in a long procession to the "Mihai Vodă" Church and remained there for 2 more days, so the people could pay their last respects.

On May 17, 1923 (which was also Heroes' Day/Ascension Day), the coffin was buried inside a crypt in Carol Park with full military honors in the presence of the royal family, the Government, members of Parliament, and numerous members of the public. The stone slab of the crypt read: "Here lies at rest happily unto the Lord the Unknown Soldier, who sacrificed his life for the unity of the Romanian people. On his bones lies the land of united Romania. 1916–1919."

On June 6, 1923, The United States War Department announced that the Medal of Honor was to be awarded to the Romanian Unknown Soldier. This is one of only five U.S. Medals of Honor to be awarded to soldiers of foreign armies allied with the United States during World War I; these were awarded to the Unknown Soldiers of allied nations.

On the night of December 22/23, 1958, the Unknown Soldier's monument was dismantled and moved, in great secrecy, to the Mărășești Mausoleum by the Communist regime to make room for the Mausoleum of the Communist Heroes, where several leaders of the Party were later interred (among them Gheorghe Gheorghiu-Dej).

In 1991, after the fall of the regime, the Tomb was moved back into the Carol Park, closer to its original location.

In 2007 the Tomb was moved even closer to its original 1923 location, right next to the Communist mausoleum.

== Gallery ==
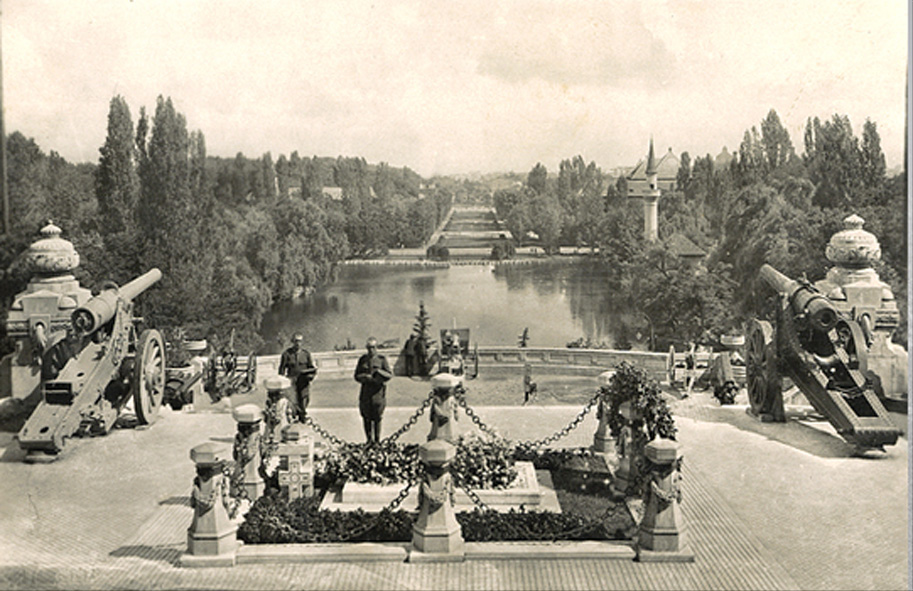
The Tomb of the Unknown Soldier in the interwar period

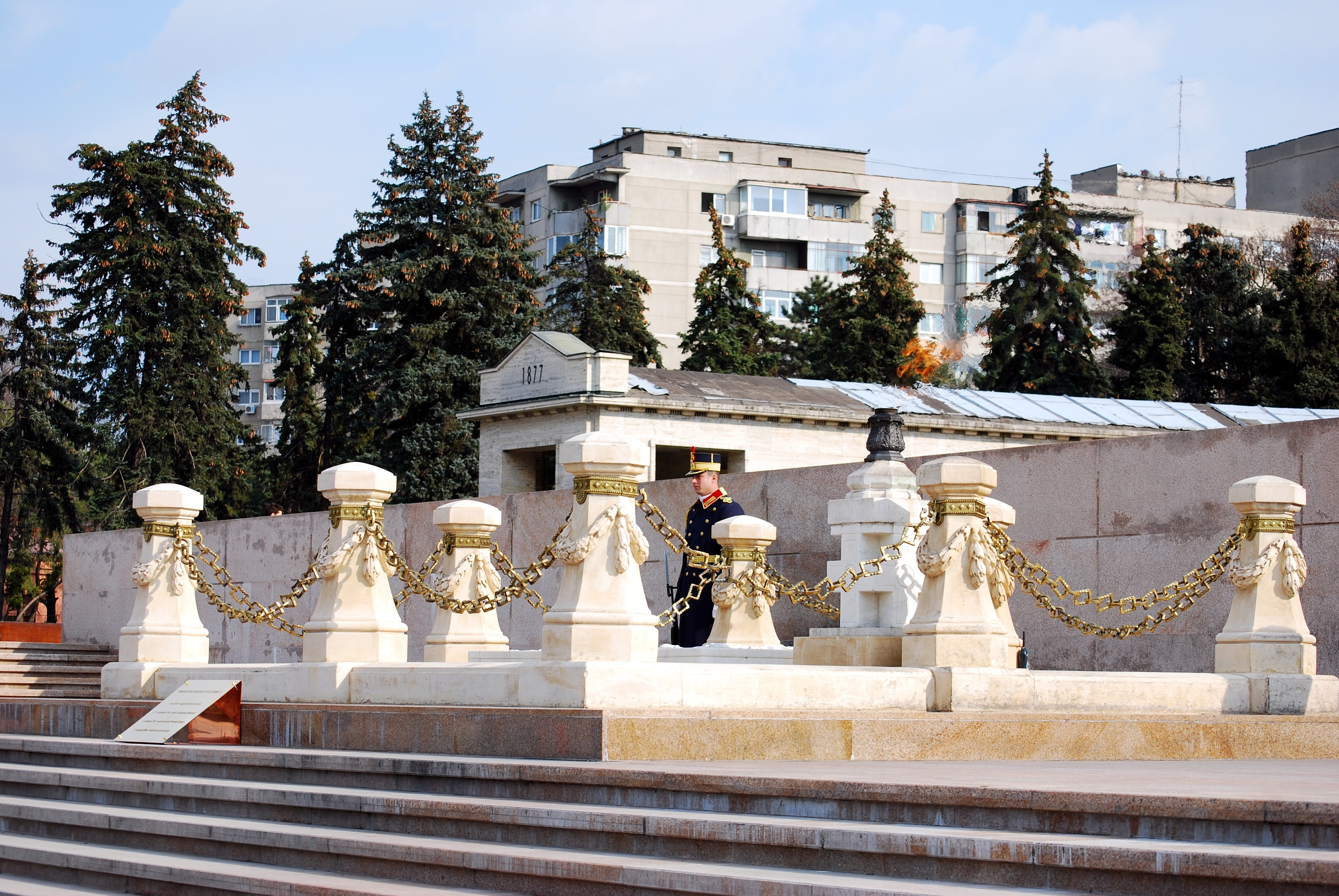
View of the Tomb

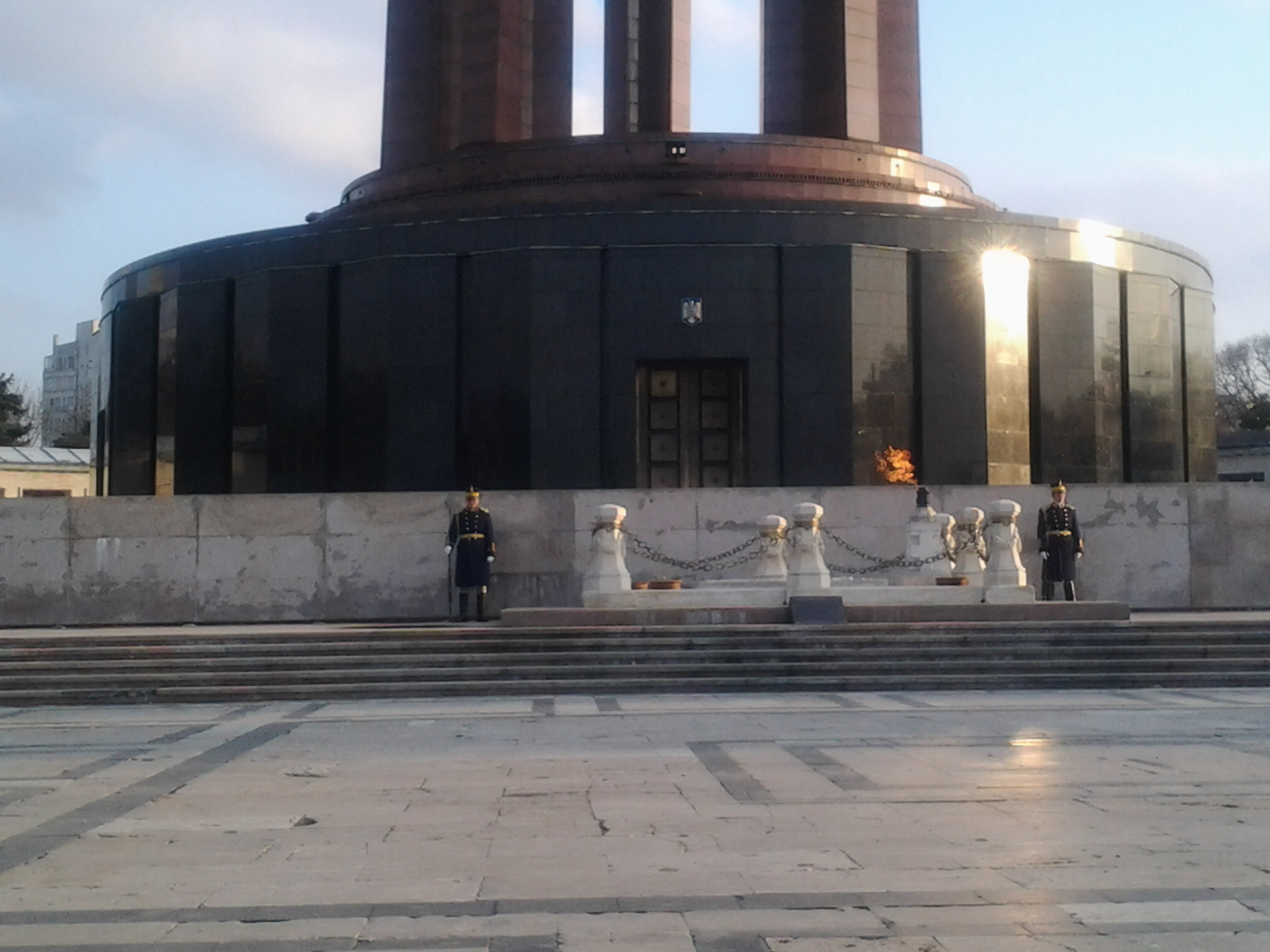
The Tomb next to the Communist mausoleum
