= National Library of Romania =

- Biblioteca Națională a României
- 44.4255°N 26.1101°E
- Location: Bulevardul Unirii, Nr. 22, Sector 3, Bucharest, Romania
- Type: National library
- Established: 1859 (167 years ago)
- Branches: Special Collections (Bucharest); Batthyani (Alba Iulia); Omnia (Craiova)

Collection
- Items collected: 13,000,000

Access and use
- Access requirements: Reader's permit

Other information
- Director: Adrian Mihai Cioroianu
- Website: bibnat.ro

The National Library of Romania (Romanian: Biblioteca Națională a României) is the national library of Romania, located at 22 Unirii Boulevard in central Bucharest. It is intended to be the repository of all that is published in Romania. The construction cost was €110 million.

== History ==
The roots of the library can be found in Saint Sava College library. Saint Sava College library was opened in 1859. After the 1859 Union, the library was officially made the national library (Biblioteca Națională, later Biblioteca Centrală - National and Central library, respectively). In 1864 the library was renamed Central Library of the State (Biblioteca Centrală a Statului).

In 1901 all the collections were ceded to the Romanian Academy Library. As a result, from 1901 to 1955, the Romanian Academy Library was the national library. In 1955, the State Central library was organised, having the attributes of a national library. In 1989, after the collapse of the communist regime, the State Central Library was once again renamed to Biblioteca Națională a României. From 1949 to 2008, the library occupied the Bucharest Chamber of Commerce Palace.

== New building ==
In 1986, a new, larger location began to be built for the library, between Piața Unirii and Nerva Traian. The initial lead architect was Cezar Lăzărescu, who died in 1986 before the building was finished. Shortly after 1989, although some parts of the building were finished or in an advanced state, due to lack of funding, the construction had stalled for several years. In 2009 the project was reassigned to the Ministry of Culture, which completed the construction in 2011 and set the official opening date to take place in 2012.

== Mission ==
The National Library is a cultural institution under the supervision of the Ministry of Culture. Its goal is to administer the national patrimony of publications, by purchasing and preserving documents and making them available to the public for research or personal study.

== Collections ==
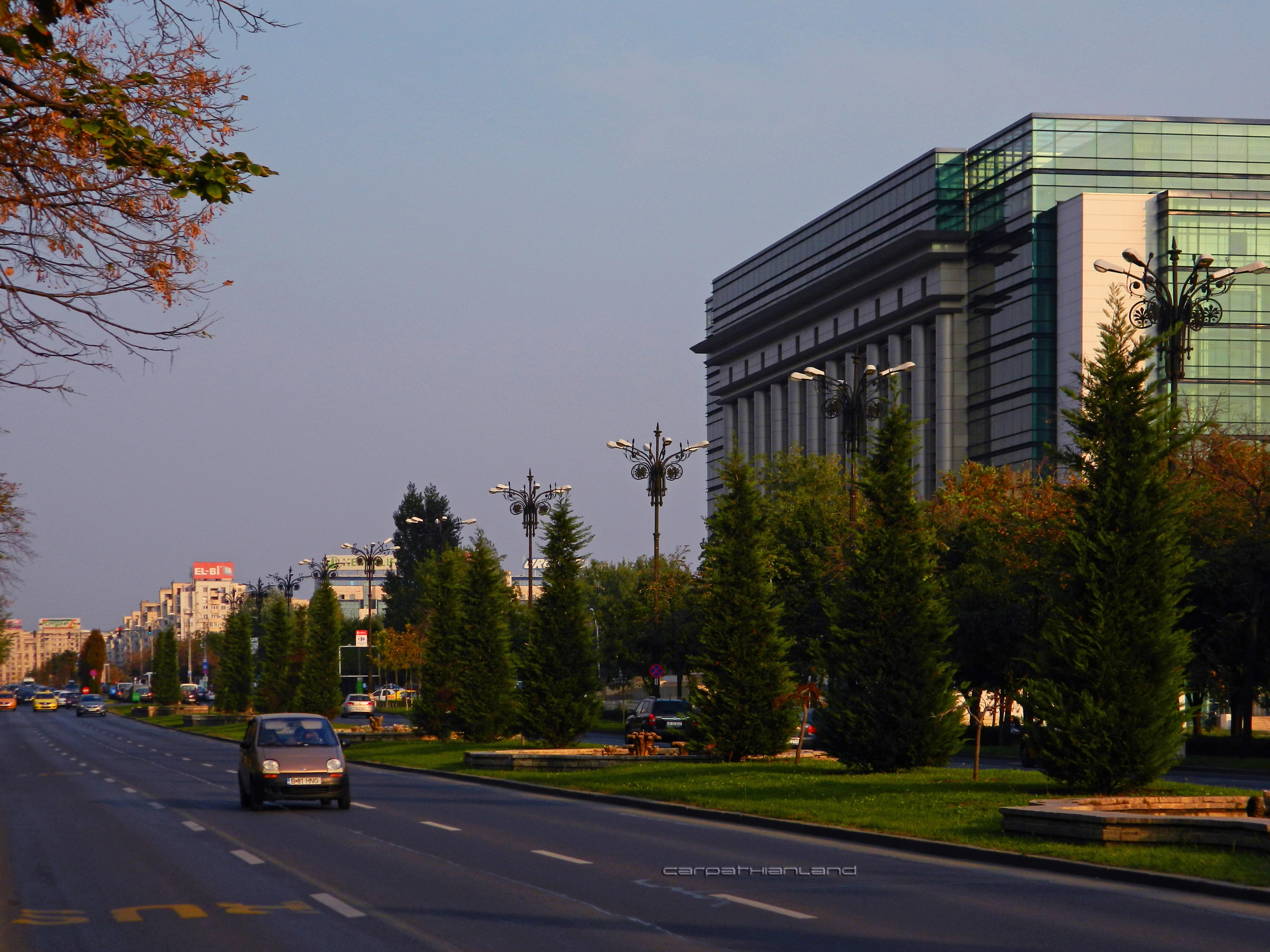
National Library of Romania viewed from Piața Unirii

It has several special collections, including:

- Bibliofilie (Rare books);
- Manuscrise (Manuscripts);
  - Including the Codex Aureus of Lorsch kept at Batthyani Library in Alba Iulia;
- Arhiva Istorică (Historical Archive);
- Periodice românești vechi (Old Romanian newspapers);
- Stampe (Prints);
- Fotografii (Photographs);
- Cartografie (Maps);
- Audio-Vizual (Audio-visual).

== Statistics ==
View of the National Library of Romania from the Dâmbovița River

- 13,000,000 items;
- 162 incunabula;
- 20,054 Romanian and foreign old books;
- 10,964 Romanian and foreign rare books;
- 29,350 audiovisual documents;
- 36,759 old and modern manuscripts;
- 47,745 serials;
- Over 800 prints;
- 70,000 original photographs.

== See also ==
- List of libraries in Romania
