= Carol Park =

Park in Bucharest, Romania

Carol I Park
- Parcul Carol I
- View of the park's Mausoleum

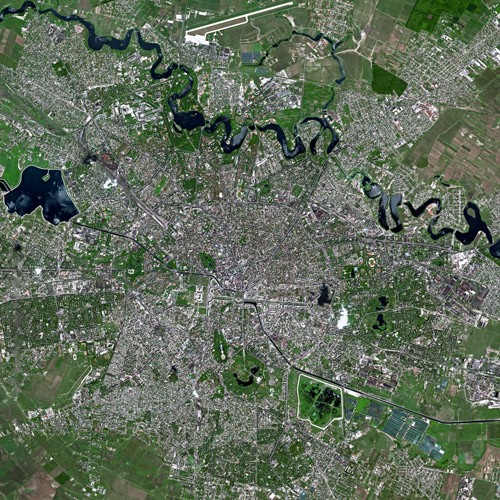
- Location within Bucharest, Romania
- Interactive map of Carol I Park
- Location: Bucharest, Romania
- Coordinates: 44°24′50″N 26°05′45″E
- Area: 36 hectares (89 acres)
- Established: 1906
- Designer: Édouard Redont
- Administrator: Administrația Lacuri, Parcuri și Agrement București
- Status: Open all year

Carol I Park (Romanian: Parcul Carol) is a public park in Bucharest, Romania, named after King Carol I of Romania. A French garden located in the southern-central area of Bucharest, partly on Filaret Hill, originally capable of hosting various exhibitions, it suffered considerable modifications during the communist regime, including a name change to Parcul Libertății (Liberty Park).

The park has officially been listed as a historical monument since 2004. Administration of the park is undertaken mostly by the Bucharest City Hall, whereas monuments are in the care of the Ministry of Culture and Religious Affairs.

== History ==
The park was designed by French landscape artist Édouard Redont in 1900 on Filaret Hill, under the supervision of Constantin Istrati, then president of the Romanian Academy. It was inaugurated in 1906, on the 40th anniversary of the coronation of King Carol I. The park had an initial surface area of 36 ha (89 acres), including the 20,000 m^{2} (220,000 sq ft) Lake Filaret. It hosted the 1906 Bucharest Exhibition, and included many pavilions and buildings, of which only the Technical Museum and the open air Roman Arenas survive.

The park once contained busts of Ioan Lahovary and Constantin Istrati, but these were replaced after 1948 with busts of George Coșbuc, Alexandru Sahia, Nicolae Bălcescu (these three by Constantin Baraschi), and the "shoemaker poet" Dumitru Theodor Neculuță (by Emil Mereanu), which remain today.

The Tomb of the Unknown Soldier, inaugurated in 1923 in memory of Romanian soldiers fallen in World War I, was dismantled and moved in 1958 to Mărășești, being replaced by the Mausoleum of the Communist Heroes (see below). In 1991 it was returned to the park, to be moved again in 2007, closer to its original location.

== Sites of interest ==
Aside from its beautiful vegetation and panoramic views, the park also includes several monuments, such as a Mausoleum, the Cantacuzino Fountain (built in 1870), another fountain, Fântâna Minelor și Carierelor (1906), the Giants' Statues, the Zodiac Fountain (1934), the Technical Museum (first opened in 1909), a monument in the shape of a small mosque built in 1923 as a sign of reconciliation. Also in the park are the open-air Roman Arena, and the Astronomical Institute of the Romanian Academy.

=== Mausoleum ===
The Carol Park Mausoleum (Mausoleul din Parcul Carol), known during the Communist régime as the "Monument of the Heroes for the Freedom of the People and of the Motherland, for Socialism" (Monumentul eroilor luptei pentru libertatea poporului și a patriei, pentru socialism), is located on a plateau. Formerly, it was the site of the Arts Palace (Palatul Artelor) and later of the Military Museum (Muzeul Militar), with the fountain in front of the latter museum.

The mausoleum was built in honour of revolutionary socialist militants. Designed by architects Horia Maicu and Nicolae Cucu, it was inaugurated on 30 December 1963, the 16th anniversary of the Romanian People's Republic.

The base is circular and plated with black granite. Above rise five narrow arches covered with red granite. Inside the base there is a rotunda covered in red granite plates; the ceiling is decorated with a golden mosaic. Prior to the Romanian Revolution of 1989, the rotunda contained the crypts of Communist leaders Petru Groza, Gheorghe Gheorghiu-Dej, and Constantin Ion Parhon. In the semicircle around the monument were crypts containing the remains of a number of socialist militants, such as Ștefan Gheorghiu, Ion C. Frimu, Mihail Gheorghiu Bujor, Leontin Sălăjan, Dumitru Petrescu, Alexandru Moghioroș, Gheorghe Cristescu, Gheorghe Stoica, Petre Constantinescu-Iași, Ștefan Voitec, Gheorghe Petrescu, Teohari Georgescu, Chivu Stoica, Gheorghe Vasilichi, Ion Pas, Constantin Doncea, Petre Borilă, Athanase Joja, Lucrețiu Pătrășcanu (after his rehabilitation), Ioan Gheorghe Olteanu, Grigore Preoteasa, Lothar Rădăceanu, Iosif Rangheț, Alecu Constantinescu, Gheorghe Petre, Ilie Pintilie, Bela Breiner, Leonte Filipescu, and Constantin Dobrogeanu-Gherea. To the right of the monument was a hemicycle containing the funeral urns of Communist leaders, such as Vasile Luca, Ștefan Foriș, Iosif Chișinevschi, Ana Pauker, Mihail Roller, and Remus Koffler, and Communist militants, including Gheorghe Vasilescu-Vasia, Constantin David, Ada Marinescu, Panait Mușoiu, Barbu Lăzăreanu, Simion Stoilow, and Mihail Macavei.

When the mausoleum was built, an eternal flame burned on an upper terrace near the monument, in a granite amphora. This was intended to preserve the memory of those who had fought on behalf of the working class.

In 1991, the mausoleum acquired a new purpose when the Communists were exhumed and interred in other cemeteries. They were replaced by the remains of soldiers fallen in World War I, brought from the Mausoleum of Mărășești. The mausoleum and the monument in front of it were dedicated to the Unknown Soldier. The rotunda remains closed to the public, and guards are stationed to prevent the approach of visitors.

In 2005, 1.97 billion old lei from the state budget were allocated to refurbish the monument, even though it was removed from the list of historic monuments in 2004.

=== Dimitrie Leonida Technical Museum ===
World first technical interactive museum.

=== Gogu Constantinescu bridge ===
Concrete bridge in Carol Park, Bucharest, designed by George Constantinescu and erected in 1906.

=== Giants' Statues ===
The two Giants' Statues (Statuile Giganții) flank the park's main walkway near the 11 June Square (Piața 11 iunie) entrance. 3.5 m (11 ft) tall and 50 m (160 ft) from one another, they form a line perpendicular to the walkway and depict two nude youths. One of them shows a young man with a strained look. His head is bowed, his right shoulder twisted, he leans on his left hand, the right he keeps behind his back, and the legs are bent. In the other statue, a young man leans his head toward his left shoulder, his torso is twisted and he supports himself on his left hand, while the right is behind his back.

At first the statues were located before the Arts Palace and of the artificial cave in front of it. The grotto was called "The Giants' Grotto" (Grota cu Giganți) or "The Enchanted Grotto" (Grota fermecată) as it was watched over by the two giants and a Sleeping beauty (Frumoasa adormită). The three statues showed the characters of a legend where twins, in love with the same woman, were turned into stone due to their unrequited love, while the object of their love became a waterfall. At that time, the giants were displayed one before the other, with the sleeping beauty lying down in the middle.

Filip Marin sculpted Sleeping beauty; Dimitrie Paciurea and Frederic Storck were responsible for the giants. The former was done in marble; the latter are in Rousse stone.

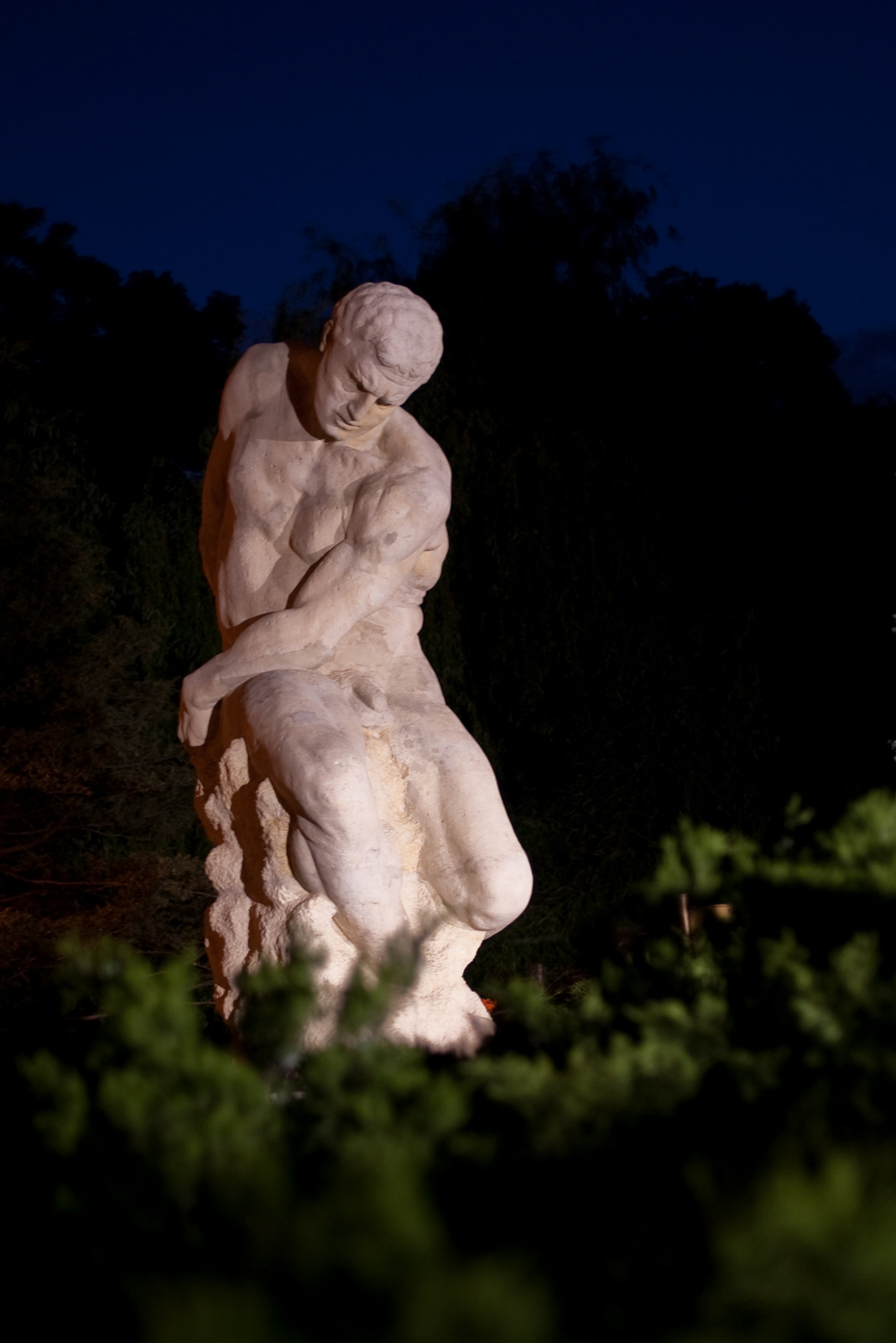
"A Giant", statue by Dimitrie Paciurea

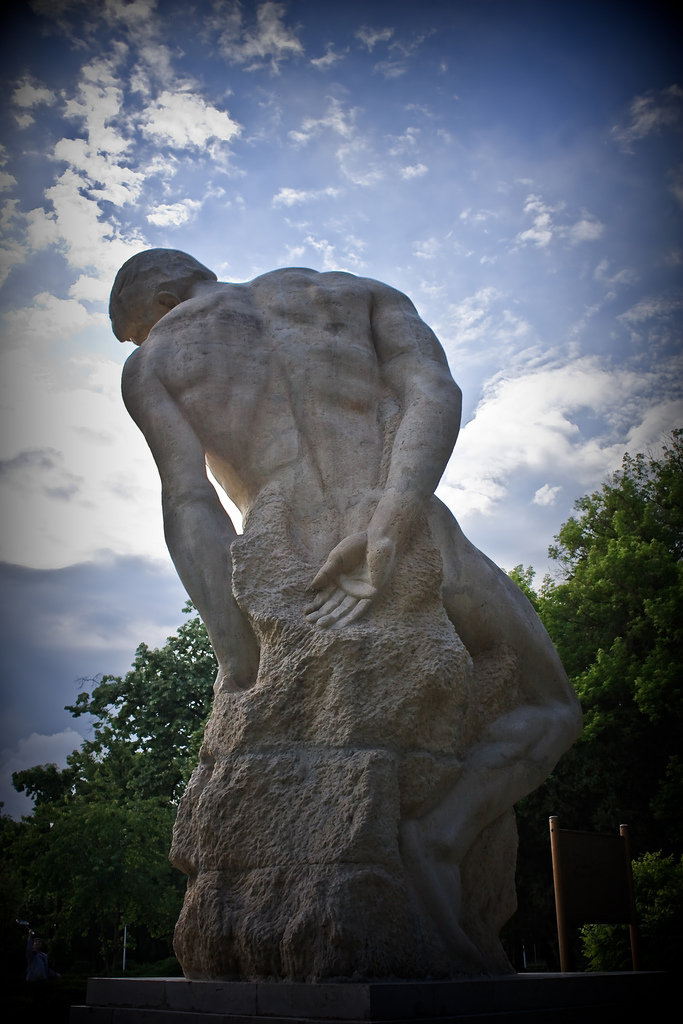
"A Giant", statue by Frederic Storck

=== Arenele Romane ===
The Roman Arena, an open-air theater built by architect Leonida Negrescu and engineer Elie Radu, were originally intended for sporting as well as cultural events. After renovation in 1968, they can host c.5,000 spectators, and are currently used as a venue for occasional concerts.

== Gallery ==
The Mausoleum

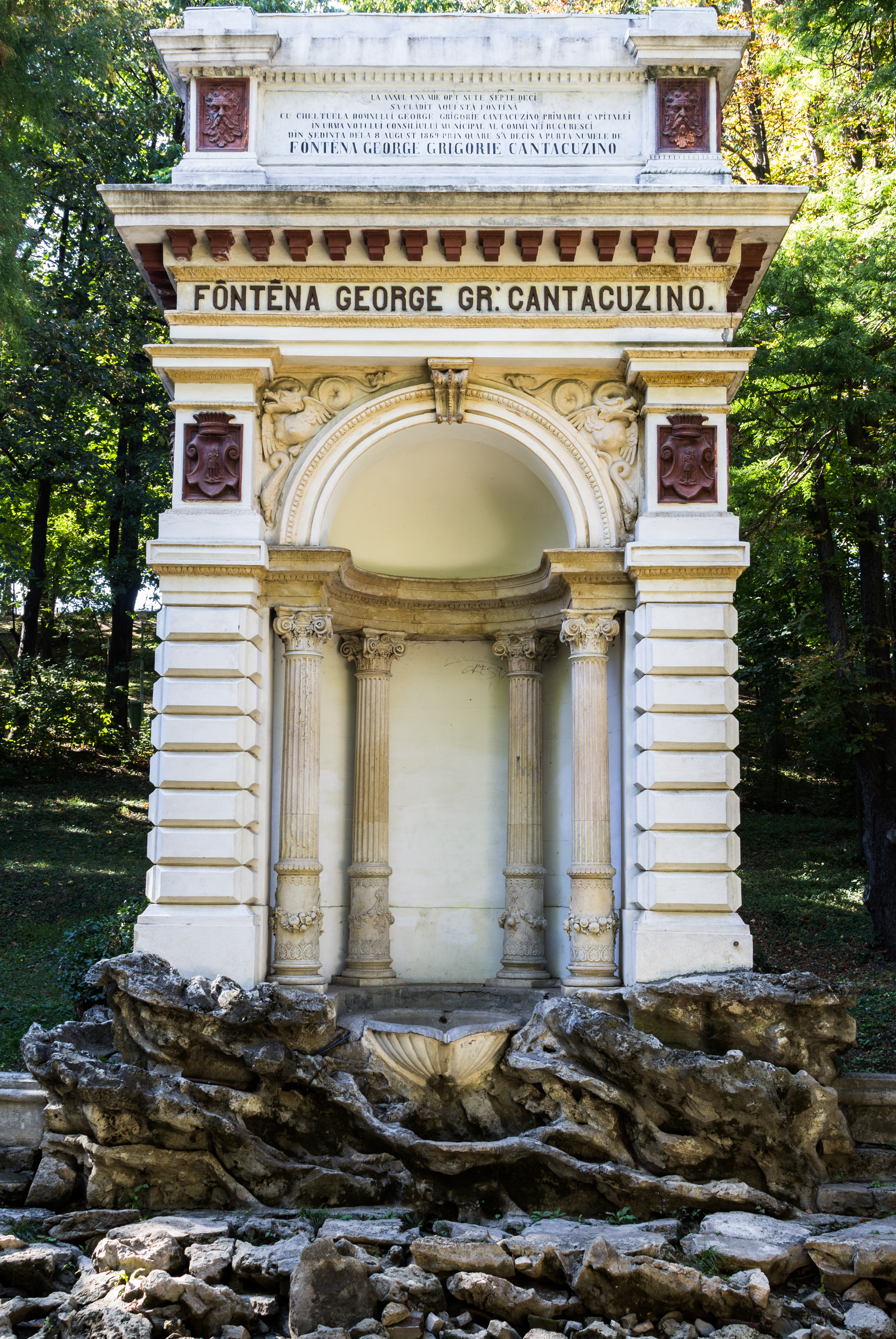
Gheorghe Grigore Cantacuzino Fountain

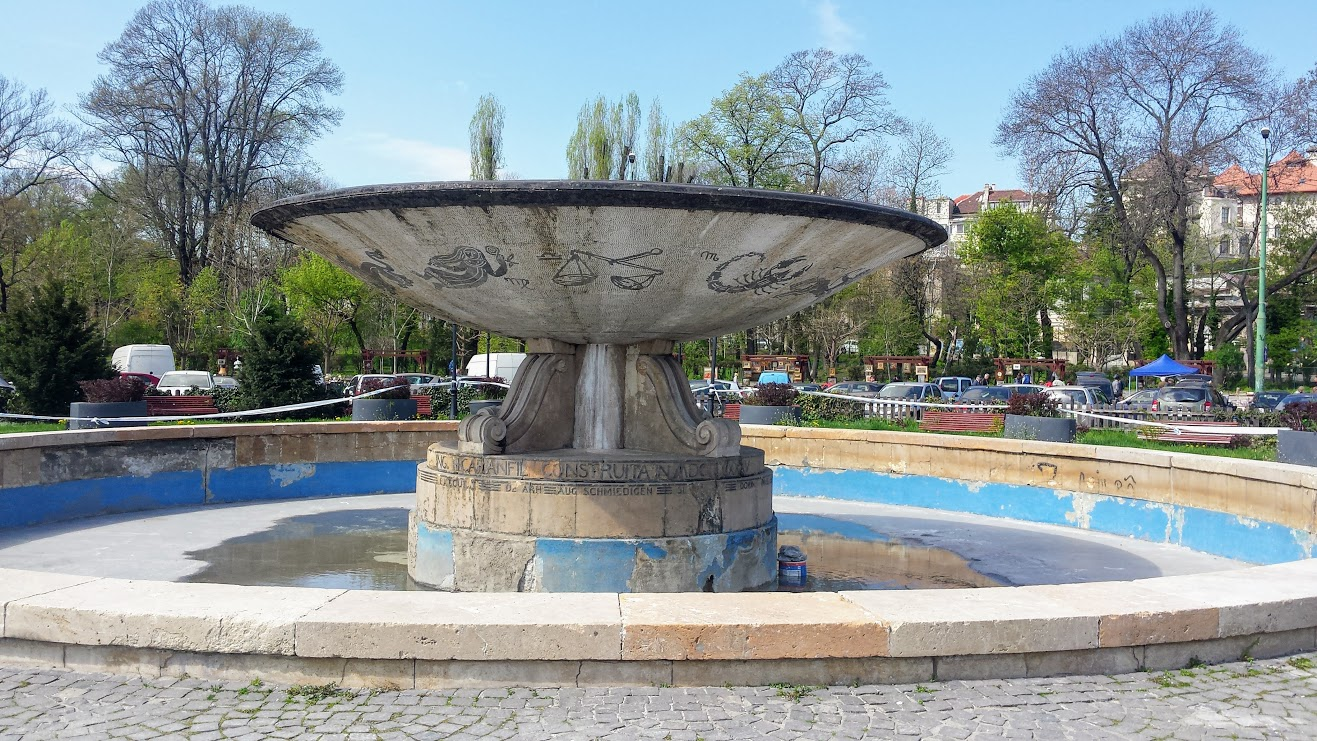
The Zodiac Fountain guards the parc entrance

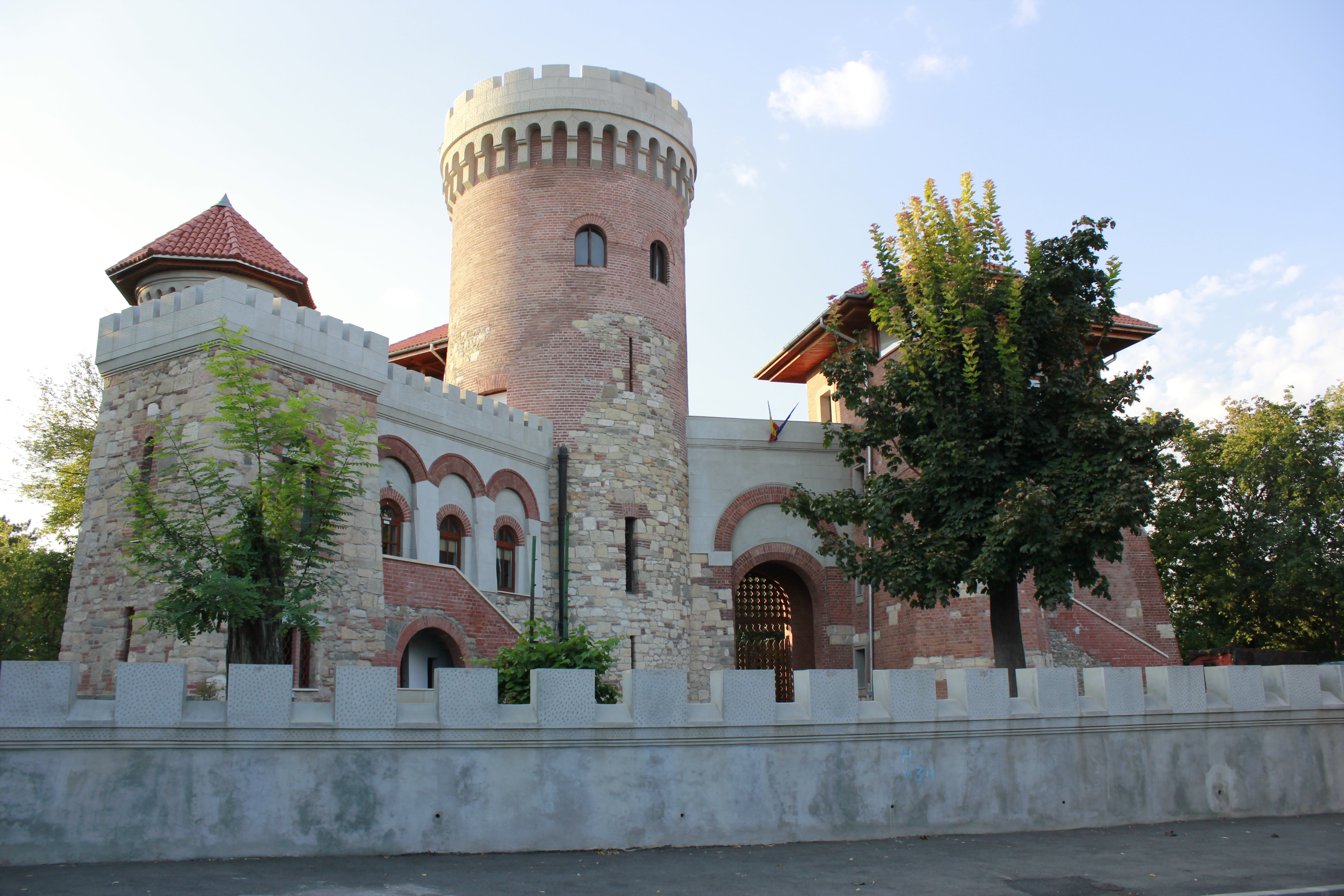
Țepeș Castle in Carol Park

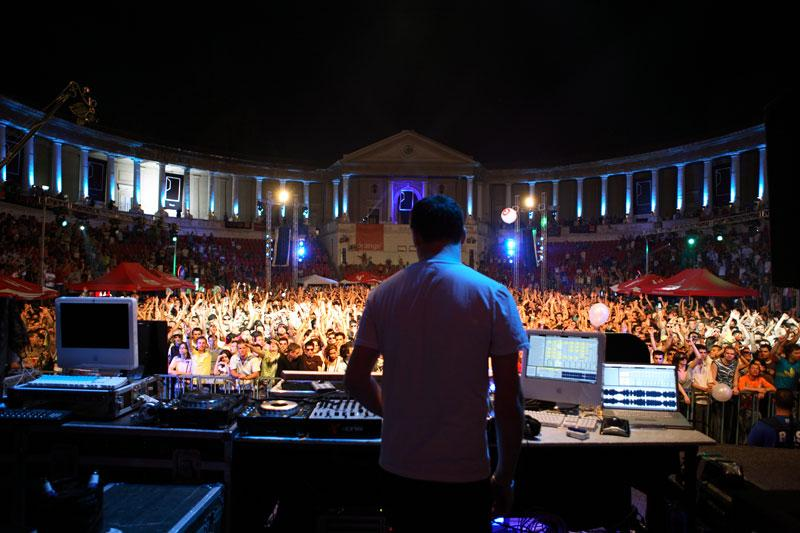
The Arenele Romane

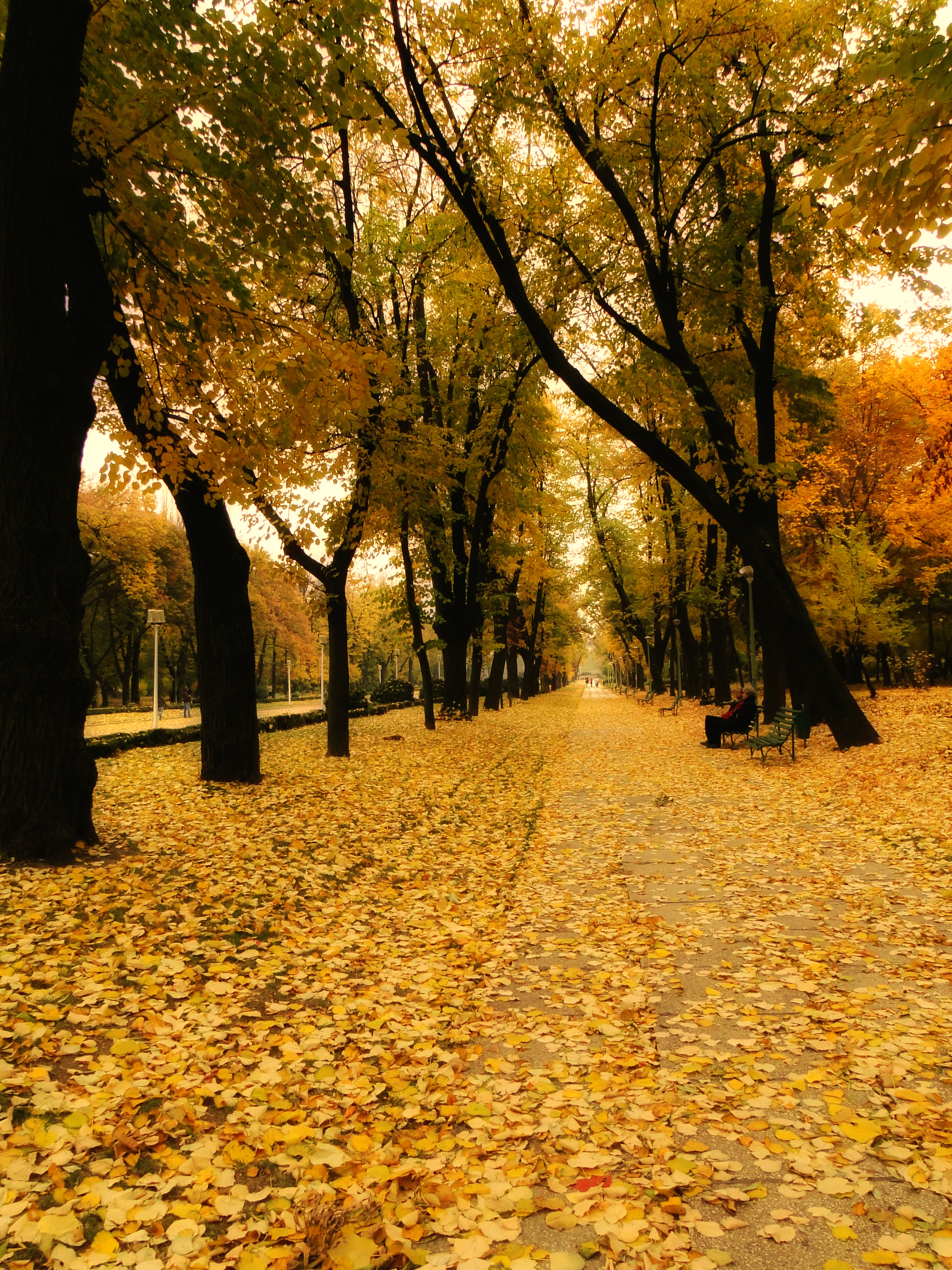
Carol Park's central alley in late autumn

== Controversy ==
The park drew national attention in 2003 when the Romanian government agreed to allot 52,700 m^{2} (567,000 sq ft) to the Romanian Orthodox Church for the People's Salvation Cathedral project. The cathedral, although popular among the citizenry and supported by the government, drew criticism because it was to be placed on the site of the mausoleum.

Symbolically, replacing the mausoleum with a church was seen by some as a removal of painful memories, similar to the removal of other communist statues and symbols. On the other hand, it was argued that it served as a reminder of Romania's fight for democracy. In addition, the building was seen as an architectural monument and drew the protests of Romanian architects. The cathedral site has since been moved next to the Palace of the Parliament.

== Bibliography ==
- Florian Georgescu, Paul Cernovodeanu, Alexandru Cebuc – Monumente din București (Editura Meridiane, București, 1966)
- Dan Berindei, Sebastian Bonifaciu – București. Ghid turistic (Editura Sport-Turism, București, 1978)
- Revista Societății de Studii Istorice Erasmus, nr 12 of 2001
