= Maria Teohari =

Romanian astronomer (1885-1975)

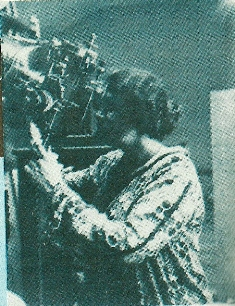
- Maria Teohari
- Born: 22 April 1885; Giurgiu, Kingdom of Romania
- Died: 1975; Bucharest, Romania
- Occupation: Astronomer
- Father: Christu Teohari

Maria Teohari (Giurgiu, Romania, 22 April 1885 - Bucharest, 1975) is credited as the first female astronomer of Romania. She lost part of her eyesight from viewing the Sun through telescopes without adequate eye protection.

== Biography ==
Teohari was born in 1885 as the eldest of three daughters of physician Christu Teohari and his wife Alexandrei.

Teohari started her formal schooling in Giurgiu but after her father's sudden death from infection, she and her mother assumed responsibility for supporting the family According to Emil Păunescu, deputy director of the Giurgiu County Museum,

"Doctor Teohari died from a finger bite that occurred at the hospital in Giurgiu during an operation. The wound became infected, and Dr. Teohari passed away leaving behind a widow with three children. As it was then, women were not working. They were housewives, so you realize how hard it was for a woman to grow up alone with three girls."

The family moved to Bucharest where Maria Teohari continued her high school studies at the "Regina Elena" School (In Romanian, "Elena Doamna") and then at the Central School. The training she received there gave her substantial credentials in drawing, literature and languages, but her passions went in a completely different direction: astronomy.

=== Astronomer ===
On the initiative of Professor Nicolae Coculescu, founder of the Bucharest Astronomical Observatory, Teohari obtained a scholarship for student astronomers. Moving abroad for one year, she began her studies at the Faculty of Sciences with specializations at astronomical observatories in Paris and Nice, (three months at the Paris Observatory and nine months at the Nice Observatory). There, she carried out observations of the Sun, small planets and asteroids.

In 1914, at the start of World War I, Teohari returned to Romania to continue her studies and observations, conducting the first solar activity observations at the Astronomical Observatory of Bucharest (now known as Astronomical Institute of the Romanian Academy), thus becoming the first female astronomer in Romania. According to Păunescu:

"At that time there was no female astronomer in Romania, and those abroad were very few. Women with aptitudes for science were marginalized at the time, but through perseverance and value they managed to be accepted.”

She published several specialized papers on planets, sunspots, protrusions of Halley's comet and other celestial phenomena in the Observatory's yearbook and in the journal Nature aimed at making this field popular. However, her observations of the Sun and sunspots with inadequate protection led to impaired eyesight, which caused her to give up her hands-on work at the Observatory.

=== Teacher ===
For her next career, Teohari become an astronomy and mathematics teacher at the Princess Ileana high school (in Romanian "Domnița Ileana") in Bucharest. To help students learn her new coursework, she published a series of textbooks focusing on two disciplines, mathematics and astronomy.

While still a teacher, she kept in touch with the Astronomical Observatory and became a mentor to researchers there. "We can say without mistaking that she was the unofficial professor of Romanian astronomers in the 20th century," said Păunescu.

She was listed as a member of the Society of Science and Mathematics in Romania in 1929.

=== Later years ===
She was very familiar with German, English and French, the languages from which she had made translations since her childhood. She also enjoyed playing the piano.

Teohari died in Bucharest soon after her 90th birthday.
