= Astronomical Institute of the Romanian Academy =

Coordinates: 44°24′38″N 26°05′41″E

The Astronomical Institute of the Romanian Academy was created in 1990 with the union of three astronomical observatories: the Bucharest Astronomical Observatory, the Cluj Observatory and the Timișoara Observatory.

== The Bucharest astronomical observatory ==
=== History ===
The astronomical observatory of Bucharest was established on 1 April 1908, by decree of the Minister of Education and Religious Affairs, Spiru Haret. Nicolae Coculescu was appointed first director of the observatory. Construction work began in 1910 on Filaret Hill in Carol Park (in the south of the city) and lasted two years. The astronomical observatory included a main building for scientific laboratories and administrative offices and a dome for an 11.5-meter telescope. Together with the astronomical observatory, a meteorological observatory was created. In 1920, the meteorological observatory was administratively separated from the astronomical observatory. In 1945, the astronomical observatory came under the coordination of the University of Bucharest and in 1951 it came under the control of the Romanian Academy. From 1975 to 1990, the Astronomical Observatory was again an independent institution. On 1 April 1990, three Romanian astronomical observatories (those in Bucharest, Cluj and Timișoara) were brought together under the guidance of a single organization: the Institute of Astronomy of the Romanian Academy. In 1990, the restoration of the observatory buildings began. In 1999, a planetarium was built for educational purposes.

=== Directors ===
- 1908–1938: Nicolae Coculescu (founder of the observatory)
- 1938–1943: Constantin C. Popovici
- 1943–1963: Gheorghe Demetrescu
- 1963–1977: Constantin Drâmbă

== See also ==
- Bucharest Observatory "Admiral Vasile Urseanu"
