= Ilie Pintilie =

Romanian activist

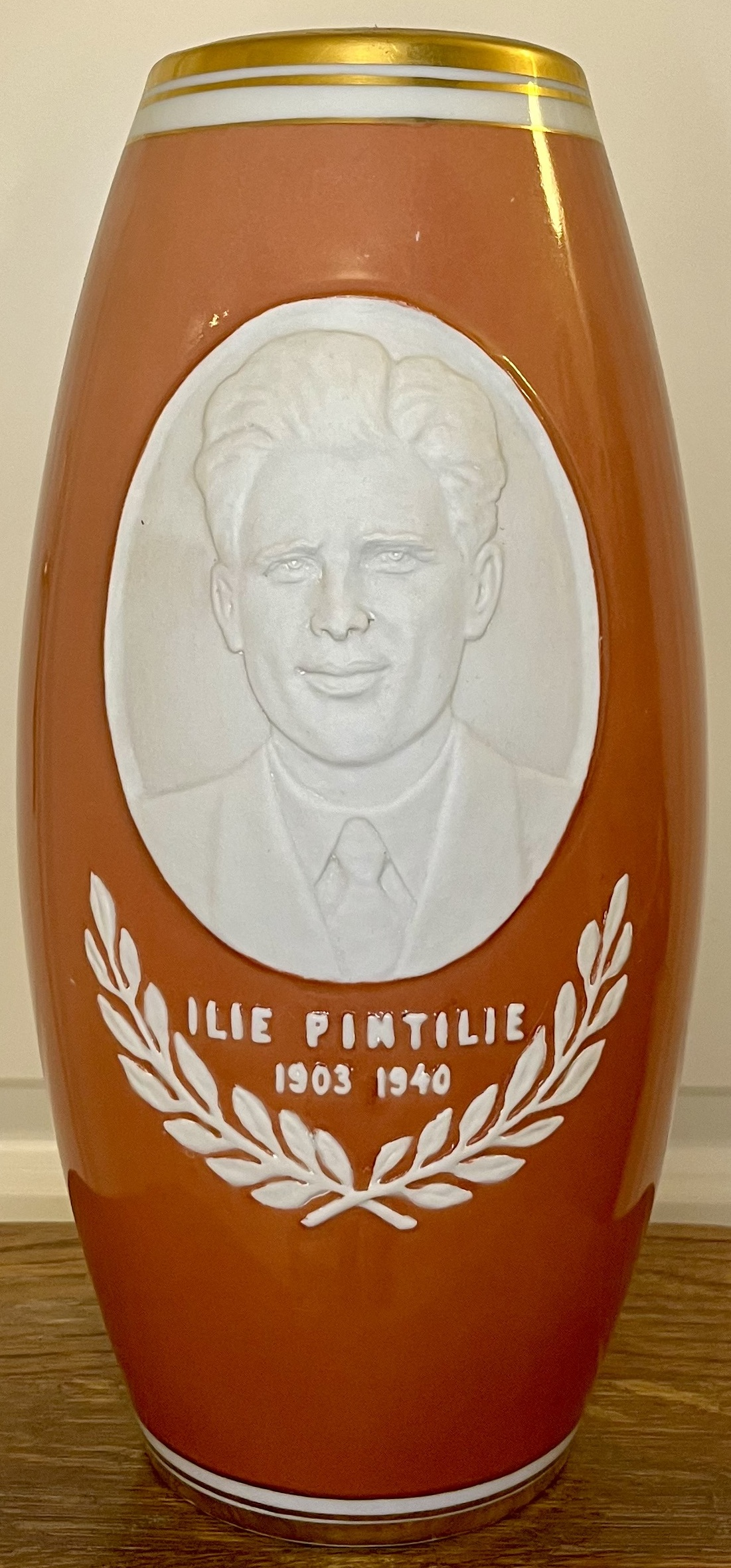
- Relief of Pintilie on a porcelain vase
- Born: 11 February 1903; Iași, Romanian Old Kingdom
- Died: 10 November 1940 (aged 37); Doftana prison
- Resting place: Carol Park
- Occupation: Railway worker
- Employer: Căile Ferate Române
- Political party: PCR
- Movement: Communism

Ilie Pintilie (1903 – 10 November 1940) was a Romanian communist railroad worker and activist of the Romanian Communist Party (PCR).

== Biography ==
Born in Iași, Pintilie joined the labour movement as an apprentice at the Căile Ferate Române (CFR) workrooms in Nicolina-Iași, and became a member of the then-outlawed PCR in 1926. In February 1933, as the Grivița Strike unfolded in Bucharest, he took part in organising railway strikes elsewhere (particularly in Iași and Pașcani) as a member of the national action committee. Between 1934 and 1937 he undertook important tasks in the leadership of CFR unions and was an active member of the anti-war movement, writing numerous articles in left-wing newspapers and magazines. In 1936 he became a member of the Central Committee of the PCR. Arrested, tried and sent to prison several times for his activities, he was detained at Galata (Iași), Suceava, and Jilava prisons before being sent to Doftana Prison. There, as an ethnic Romanian and a worker, he was the only rival for leadership of Gheorghe Gheorghiu-Dej, who had made a name for himself in the Grivița Strike. Pintilie was killed when Doftana Prison collapsed during the 1940 Vrancea earthquake.

== Legacy ==
Pintilie was buried in the crypt in the Carol Park Mausoleum; his remains were interred elsewhere when the Mausoleum was shut down in 1991. During the Communist period, a large number of streets bore his name, including Bucharest's Ilie Pintilie Boulevard, formerly Bonaparte Highway and called Iancu de Hunedoara Boulevard since the Romanian Revolution of 1989.
