= Anca Petrescu =

Romanian architect and politician

- Born: 20 March 1949; Sighișoara, Romanian People's Republic
- Died: 30 October 2013 (aged 64); Bucharest, Romania
- Citizenship: Romanian
- Education: Ion Mincu University of Architecture and Urban Planning
- Occupation: Architect
- Buildings: Palace of the Parliament

Mira Anca Victoria Mărculeț Petrescu (20 March 1949 – 30 October 2013) was a Romanian architect and politician.

Born in Sighișoara, Romania, Petrescu graduated from the Ion Mincu Institute of Architecture in Bucharest in 1973.

In 1986, on the orders of Romanian leader Nicolae Ceaușescu, Petrescu became chief architect of the colossal Palace of the Parliament in Bucharest, a thirteen-year megaproject constructing the world's second-largest civilian administrative building after the Pentagon. During the 1970s and 1980s, she was involved in many of Bucharest's redevelopment projects, which led to the relocation of thousands of residents in order to demolish their old, poor neighborhoods, replacing them with modern residential developments.

Petrescu served as a member of Parliament for the Greater Romania Party (PRM) between 2004 and 2008.

On 5 August 2013, Petrescu was involved in a major car accident. A month later, she fell into a coma from which she never recovered, dying from complications on 30 October 2013 in Bucharest, aged 64.
