= Palace of the Parliament =

Seat of the Parliament of Romania

- Palatul Parlamentului
- The Palace in 2024
- Former names: "House of the Republic"
- Alternative names: "The People's House"

General information
- Architectural style: Postmodern (mainly Neoclassical, described as "Neo-Neoclassical")
- Location: Strada Izvor 2-4, Bucharest, Romania
- Coordinates: 44°25′39″N 26°5′15″E
- Groundbreaking: 25 June 1984
- Completed: 1997; 29 years ago
- Cost: €4 billion euros

Height
- Architectural: 84 m (276 ft)

Technical details
- Size: 240 m (790 ft) long, 270 m (890 ft) wide
- Floor count: 12
- Floor area: 365,000 m^{2} (3,930,000 sq ft)
- Grounds: 66,000 m^{2}

Design and construction
- Architect: 700 architects under the direction of chief architect Anca Petrescu (1949–2013)
- Designations: World's largest civilian building with an administrative function; World's most expensive administrative building; World's heaviest administrative building

Other information
- Number of rooms: 1,100

The Palace of the Parliament (Romanian: Palatul Parlamentului), initially designed during Communist times as the People's House (Casa Poporului) or (less frequently used) the House of the Republic (Casa Republicii), is the seat of the Parliament of Romania, located atop Dealul Spirii in Bucharest, the national capital. The Palace reaches a height of 84 m (276 ft), is 92 m (302 ft) deep underground, has a floor area of 365,000 m^{2} (3,930,000 sq ft) and a volume of 2,550,000 m^{3} (90,000,000 cu ft). The Palace of the Parliament is the heaviest building in the world, weighing about 4,098,500 tonnes (9.04 billion pounds), and is the largest civilian administrative building in the world, the largest military administrative building being the yet larger US Pentagon (cf. List of largest buildings). The Independent described it as the third best building in the world, "hideous but also sort of impressive."

The building was designed and supervised by chief architect Anca Petrescu, with a team of approximately 700 architects, and constructed over a period of 13 years (1984–1997) in modernist Neoclassical architectural forms and styles, with socialist realism in mind. The Palace was ordered by Nicolae Ceaușescu (1918–1989), the president of Communist Romania.

Known for its ornate interior composed of 23 sections, the palace houses the two chambers of the Parliament of Romania: the Senate (Senat) and the Chamber of Deputies (Camera Deputaților), the Constitutional Court, along with three museums and an international conference centre. The museums in the Palace are the National Museum of Contemporary Art, and the Museum of the Palace. Though originally named the House of the Republic when under construction, the palace became widely known as the "People's House" after the Romanian Revolution of December 1989. Due to its impressive characteristics, events organized by state institutions and international bodies such as conferences and symposia take place there, but despite this about 70% of the building remains empty.

As of 2020, the Palace of the Parliament is valued at €4 billion, making it the most expensive administrative building in the world. The cost of heating and electricity alone exceeds $6 million per year.

The old Palace of the Chamber of Deputies is now the Palace of the Patriarchate.

== Location ==
The Palace is in Sector 5 in the central part of Bucharest, at the top of Dealul Spirii (Spirea's Hill), also known as Dealul Arsenalului (Arsenal Hill). It is at the west end of the 3.5-kilometre (2.2 mi) Bulevardul Unirii (Union Boulevard), constructed at the same time as the Palace, and is ringed by Izvor Street to the west and northwest, United Nations Avenue to the north, Liberty Avenue to the east and Calea 13 Septembrie to the south.

== History ==
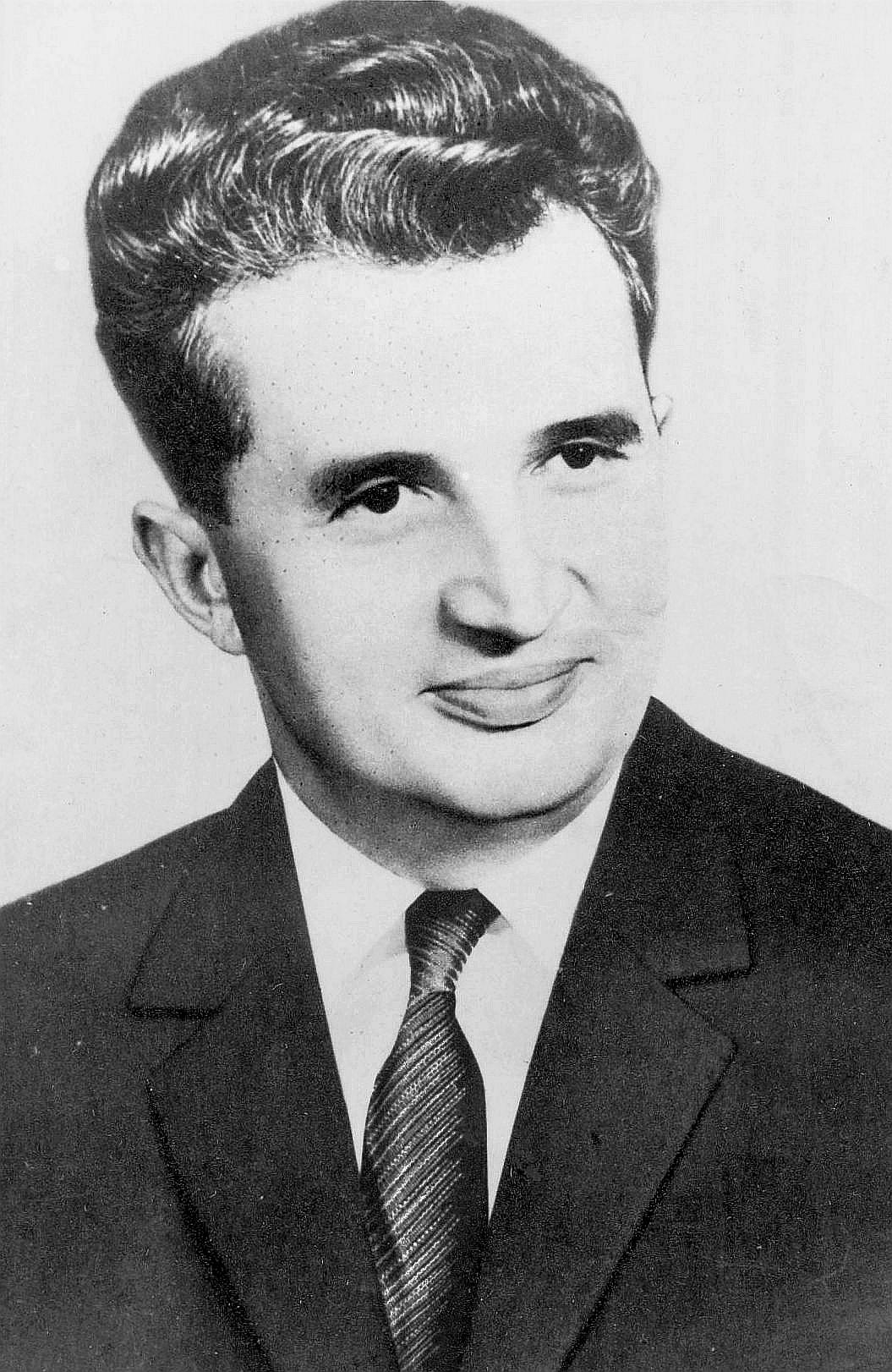
Romanian dictator Nicolae Ceaușescu ordered the building of a colossal structure

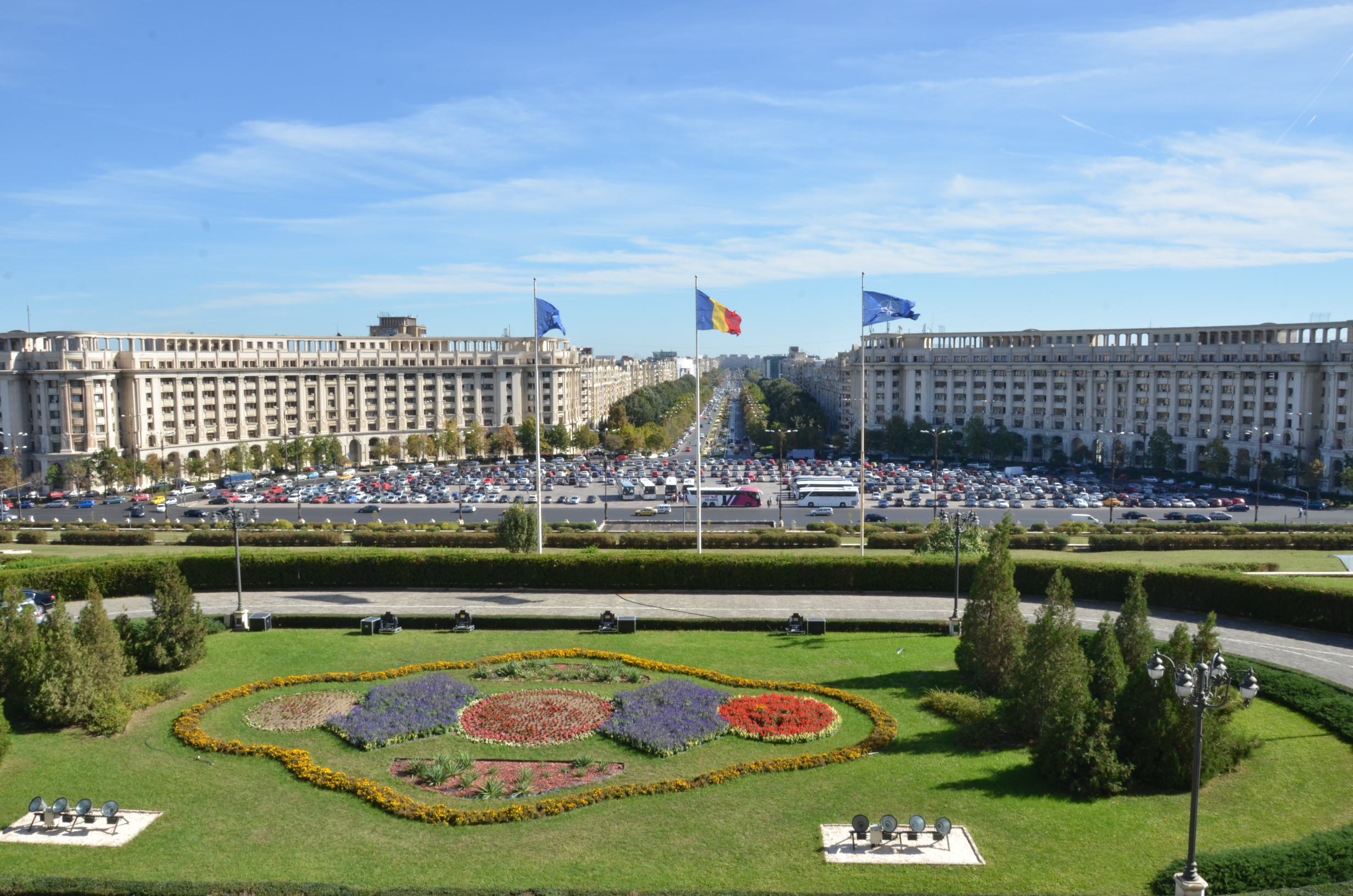
View from the palace. For its construction, the Uranus-Izvor neighborhood was demolished.

=== Construction ===
The construction of the Palace of the Parliament was the most extreme expression of the systematization program imposed on Romania by Nicolae Ceaușescu. Systematization was a program of urban planning carried out by Ceaușescu, who was impressed by the societal organization and mass adulation he saw in North Korea's Juche ideology during his East Asia visit in 1971. Ceaușescu decided to implement similar policies in his country, with the stated goal of turning Romania into a "multilaterally developed socialist society."

A systematization project existed since the 1930s (during the time of King Carol II) for the Unirii–Dealul Arsenalului area. The Vrancea earthquake of 4 March 1977 gave Ceaușescu a pretext to demolish parts of old Bucharest. He wanted a civic center more in line with the country's political stance and started a reconstruction plan of Bucharest based on the socialist realism style. The House of the Republic was the centrepiece of Ceaușescu's project. Named Project Bucharest, it began in 1978 as an intended replica of the North Korean capital, Pyongyang. North Korean President Kim Il Sung had started construction on a similarly monumental residence, the Kumsusan Palace, two years earlier.

A contest was held and won by Anca Petrescu (1949–2013), who was appointed chief architect of the project at the age of 28. The team that coordinated the work was made up of 10 assisting architects, which supervised a further 700. Construction of the palace began on 25 June 1984, and the inauguration of the work was attended by Ceaușescu, who also frequently inspected the site.

Uranus Hill was leveled, and the Uranus-Izvor neighborhood was destroyed so the building could be erected. The area had also been home to the National Archives, Mihai Vodă Monastery and other monasteries, Brâncovenesc Hospital, as well as about 37 old factories and workshops. Demolition in the Uranus area began in 1982. Approximately 7 km^{2} (2.7 sq mi) of the old city centre were demolished, with 40,000 people being relocated from the area.

Between 20,000 and 100,000 people worked on the site and project, operating in three shifts made up of 5,000 Romanian People's Army soldiers and huge numbers of "volunteers". The number of deaths that occurred during construction is a matter of controversy, the official data suggests 27 but workers involved in the construction of the building talk of a much higher number, some say thousands.

During the 1980s, the Romanian government implemented a crippling austerity policy to pay the foreign debt. In 1989, the building costs were estimated at US$1.75 billion, and in 2006 at US$3 billion. In 1990, Australian-born business and media magnate Rupert Murdoch tried to buy the building for US$1 billion, but his bid was rejected.

=== After 1989 ===
Since 1994, the palace has housed the lower house of the Romanian Parliament, the Chamber of Deputies, after its former seat, the Palace of the Chamber of Deputies (now the Palace of the Patriarchate), was donated by the state to the Romanian Orthodox Church. Since 2004, the upper house, the Senate of Romania, has also been housed in the Palace of the Parliament, after having left the former headquarters of the Central Committee of the Romanian Communist Party.

Six years after the palace's completion, between 2003 and 2004, a glass annex was built alongside the external elevators. This was done to facilitate outside access to the National Museum of Contemporary Art, which opened in 2004 in the west wing of the palace. During the same period, a project aiming to hoist a huge flag was cancelled following public protests. A flag already hoisted outside the building was also removed after the protests.

A restaurant inside the palace, accessible only to politicians, was refurbished. Since 1998, the building has also housed an office for the Regional Southeast European Cooperative Initiative (SECI) Centre for Fighting Transborder Crime.

In 2008, the Palace hosted the 20th summit of the North Atlantic Treaty Organization. In 2010, politician Silviu Prigoană proposed re-purposing the building into a shopping centre and entertainment complex. Citing costs, Prigoană said that the Romanian Parliament should move to a new building, since they occupied only 30% of the massive palace. While the proposal sparked debate in Romania, politician Miron Mitrea dismissed the idea as a "joke".

The palace has also been the background for several motorsports events, including the 2011 Drift Grand Prix Romania, which brought together professional drifters from all over Europe.

=== Copyrights over the building's image ===
Although the Palace of the Parliament was financed from public funds and the architects did work for hire, after the death of chief architect Anca Petrescu, her heirs sued the Chamber of Deputies for using images of the iconic building without authorization. The chamber was accused of copyright infringement for selling photos and souvenirs depicting the building's image. In other lawsuits, the heirs claimed violation of trademarks owned by the chief architect through the depiction of the palace from different angles.

While legal experts state that no restrictions exist for tourists wishing to photograph the iconic building for non-commercial purposes, Petrescu's heirs have clearly set out that any commercial use of the building's image is subject to a 2% royalty fee. It is believed the situation could have been avoided if an agreement between the chief architect and the beneficiary (the Romanian state) had addressed the intellectual property rights and Romania had implemented freedom of panorama, restricting the scope of copyright law in such cases.

== Technical details ==
Construction of the palace began in 1984 and was initially scheduled for completion in two years. The project was extended to 1990, but in 2013 it was reported that only 400 rooms and two large meeting rooms were finished and being used, out of a total of 1,100 rooms.

The building has eight underground levels, the deepest housing a nuclear bunker, linked to main state institutions by 20 km (12.4 mi) of tunnels. Nicolae Ceaușescu feared nuclear war. The bunker is a room with 1.5-metre-thick (4.9 ft) concrete walls said to be impervious to radiation. The shelter is composed of a main hall – headquarters which would have had telephone connections with all military units in Romania – and several residential apartments for state leadership, to be used in the event of war.

The palace's floor area of 365,000 m^{2} (3,930,000 sq ft) makes it the world's third-largest administrative building after the Pentagon outside of Washington, D.C. in the United States and the Sappaya-Sapasathan in Thailand. It is also among the most massive buildings in terms of volume, measuring 2,550,000 m^{3} (90,000,000 cu ft): for comparison, the building exceeds by 2% the volume of the Great Pyramid of Giza in Egypt, leading some sources to label it "pharaonic".

The Palace of the Parliament sinks 6 mm (0.24 in) each year due to its weight. Romanian specialists who have analyzed the data have explained that the palace's massive weight is causing the layers of sediment below the building to settle.

=== Materials ===
The building was constructed almost entirely of materials of Romanian origin. Among the few exceptions are the doors of Nicolae Bălcescu Hall, received by Ceaușescu as a gift from his friend Mobutu Sese Seko, longtime totalitarian President of Zaire (today the Democratic Republic of the Congo).

Among the materials are 3,500 tonnes of crystal – 480 chandeliers, 1,409 ceiling lights and mirrors were manufactured; 700,000 tonnes of steel and bronze for monumental doors and windows, chandeliers and capitals; 1,000,000 m^{3} (35,000,000 cu ft) of marble, 900,000 m^{3} (32,000,000 cu ft) of wood (over 95% domestic) for parquet and wainscotting, including walnut, oak, sweet cherry, elm, sycamore maple; 200,000 m^{2} (2,200,000 sq ft) of woollen carpets of various dimensions (machines had to be moved inside the building to weave some of the larger carpets); velvet and brocade curtains adorned with embroideries and passementeries in silver and gold.

== In popular culture ==
The Palace of the Parliament has featured in a variety of films, most famously as the Vatican in the 2018 horror film The Nun. Other films include War Dogs, starring Jonah Hill; Dying of the Light, starring Nicolas Cage; and What About Love (2022), starring Sharon Stone and Andy García.

It also appeared on an episode of Top Gear in 2009, titled "Romanian GT Road Trip to Find the Transfagarasan Highway".

== Gallery ==
Details

Elaborate decorations in Alexandru Ioan Cuza Hall

The palace's crystal chandeliers were manufactured at Vitrometan Mediaș glass factory. Manufacturing the 480 chandeliers took two years.

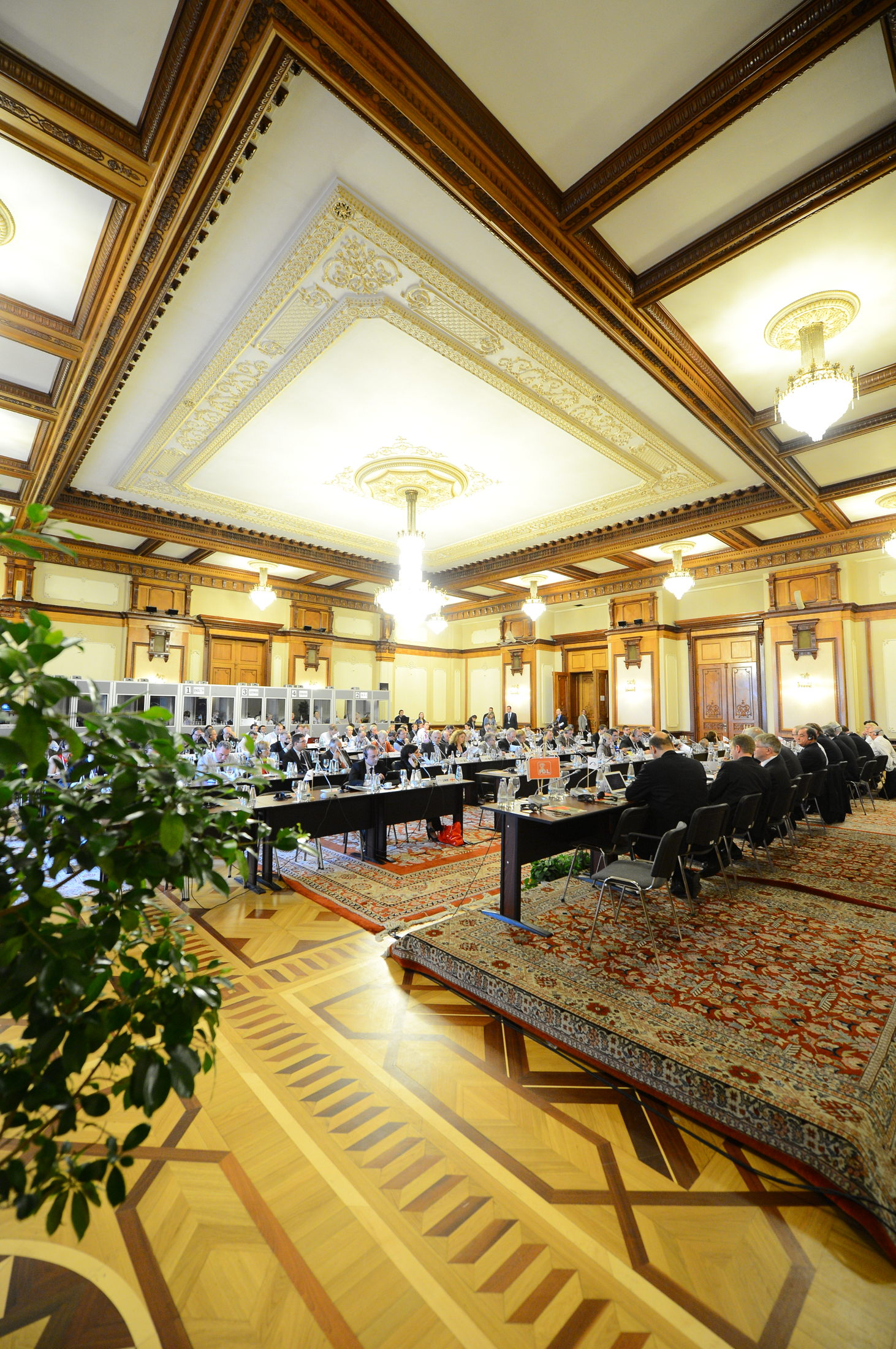
Inside the Palace of the Parliament

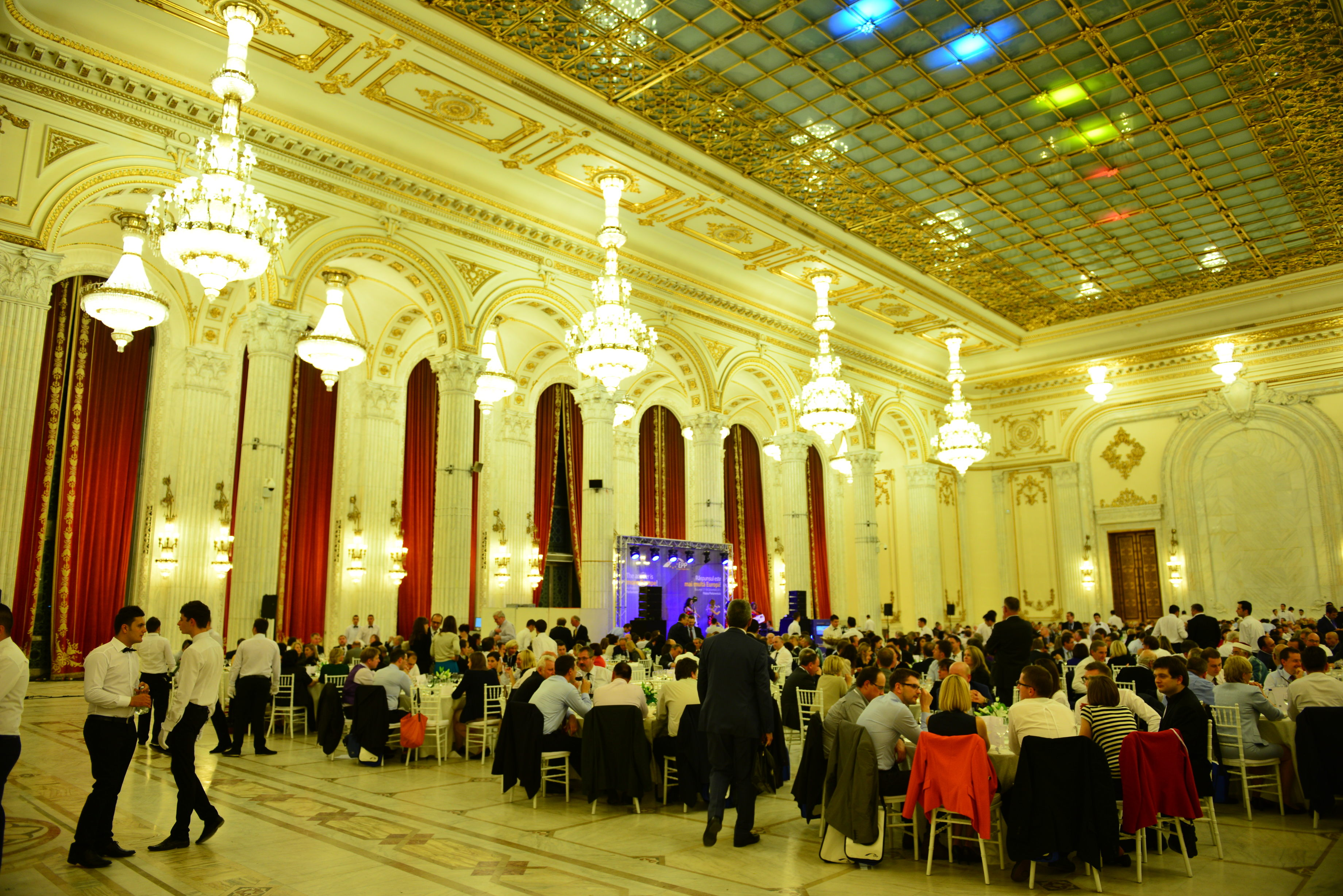
International Conference Centre

"C. A. ROSETTI" Hall

Palace of the Parliament as photographed from Union Avenue

Parking nearby Palace of the Parliament

Wide shot of the palace

== See also ==
- Seven Wonders of Romania
