= Centrul Civic =

District in central Bucharest, Romania

Coordinates: 44°25′37.65″N 26°5′41.90″E

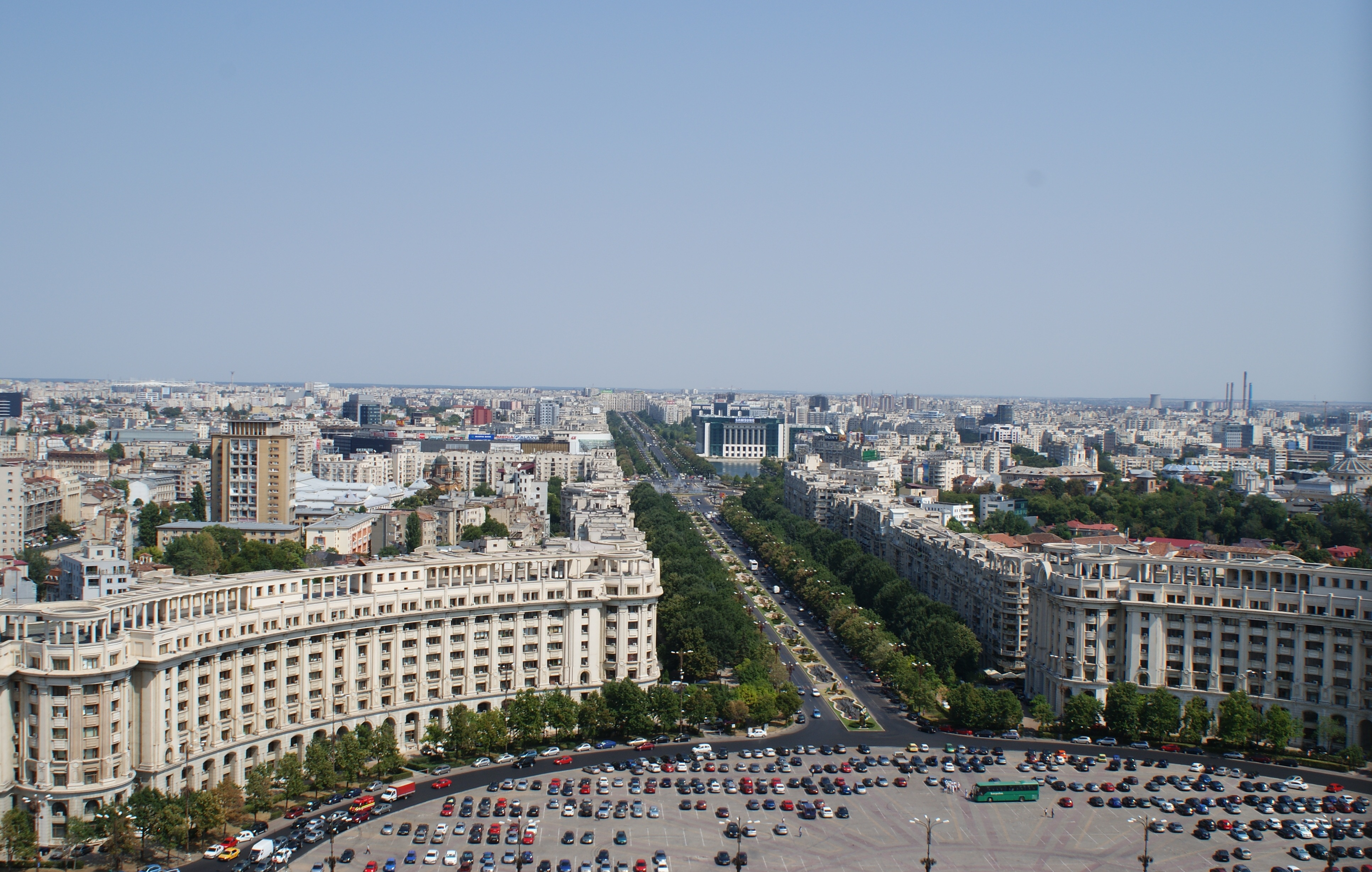
Panoramic view

Centrul Civic (Romanian: [ˈtʃentrul ˈtʃivik]; "the Civic Centre") is a district in central Bucharest, Romania, which was completely rebuilt in the 1980s as part of the scheme of systematization under the dictator Nicolae Ceaușescu, which included the construction of new civic centres in the Romanian cities. Bucharest Civic Centre was planned to become the new political-administrative center of Communist Romania.

== History ==
Bucharest suffered significant damage due to Allied bombing during World War II and the devastating earthquake of March 4, 1977. However, neither of these events changed the face of the city more than the Ceaușescan "redevelopment schemes" of the 1980s, under which an overall area of 5.9 square kilometres (2.3 sq mi) of the historic center of Bucharest was affected, including monasteries, churches, synagogues, a hospital, and a noted Art Deco sports stadium (Stadionul Republicii). This also involved evicting 40,000 people after a single day's notice and relocating them to new homes, in order to make way for the grandiose Centrul Civic and the House of the Republic, now officially renamed as the Palace of the Parliament.

Prior to starting to demolish the old historical town of Bucharest in order to build Centrul Civic, Bucharest (and other cities and towns throughout the country) had already undergone Communist reconstruction, particularly in the 1970s, under the systematization programme which consisted of the demolition and reconstruction of existing villages, towns, and cities, in whole or in part, in order to make place to standardized blocks of flats (blocuri), as a result of increasing urbanization following an accelerated industrialization process. The construction of Centrul Civic and the demolitions necessary for it, however, were quite extreme even compared to other reconstruction communist programmes.

The vast empty fields which emerged in the historic town during the demolitions of the 1980s were sarcastically called "Ceaușima" (a portmanteau of Ceaușescu and Hiroshima). Concrete hulks of half-completed buildings (such as the new National Library of Romania) long stood where historic buildings (including most of the city's historic Jewish quarter) once stood. A remainder of the former "Ceaușima" is the never-completed eastern large area between the Mircea Vodă Boulevard and Nerva Traian Street (10.7 hectares (26 acres)), where in 1989 had begun the construction of the National Centre for Creation and Culture, named after Cântarea României, an ensemble that would include seven performance halls, the first six with capacities between 550 and 2,100 seats, and the seventh, dedicated to the National Opera, of 3,100 seats.

Centrul Civic is surrounded all-around by old historical buildings and neighborhoods (Lipscani street in particular is a famous old-fashioned street). Many churches, such as the Mihai Vodă Monastery, were moved rather than demolished, and the nearby Antim Monastery remains largely intact, although lacking its original eastern wing. Immediately next to Piața Unirii (the Union Square) is Dealul Mitropoliei (the Metropolitan Hill), with the Patriarchal Cathedral and Palace, the seat of the Patriarch of the Romanian Orthodox Church.

== Description ==
Centrul Civic is a complex of modern concrete buildings with marble façades, centered on a main boulevard originally meant to be Bulevardul Victoria Socialismului (the Victory of Socialism Boulevard). Being renamed, after the Romanian Revolution of 1989, in Bulevardul Unirii (the Union Boulevard), it has been modeled after Paris's Champs-Élysées, though a little wider; it runs roughly east–west, making a grand approach to the Palace of the Parliament at its western terminus. A large balcony in the Palace surveys the entire length of the boulevard. Other streets included in the perimeter of Centrul Civic are, among others, Libertății (Liberty) Boulevard, Decebal Boulevard, Burebista Boulevard (unfinished), United Nations (Națiunile Unite) Boulevard, Octavian Goga Boulevard, Mircea Vodă Boulevard (partially), Nerva Traian Street (partially), Izvor Street, or Calea 13 Septembrie (partially).

Centrul Civic includes numerous public offices and apartments, the latter roughly equalling the housing units destroyed for its construction. The apartments were originally intended to house Romania's communist elite. In the Union Square, the boulevard bisects the Dâmbovița river, which is channelled at this point underground the Square.

With its architectural uniformity, Centrul Civic stands out as a Socialist Realism style monument. Due to the lack of attractiveness for the commercial spaces located on the ground floor of the respective buildings, as a result of the relatively low pedestrian traffic in the area, most of the small shops and restaurants that form the heart of Bucharest are to be found in the areas immediately to the north of Centrul Civic, in Bucharest Old Town.

Architectural depictions of Centrul Civic Bucharest
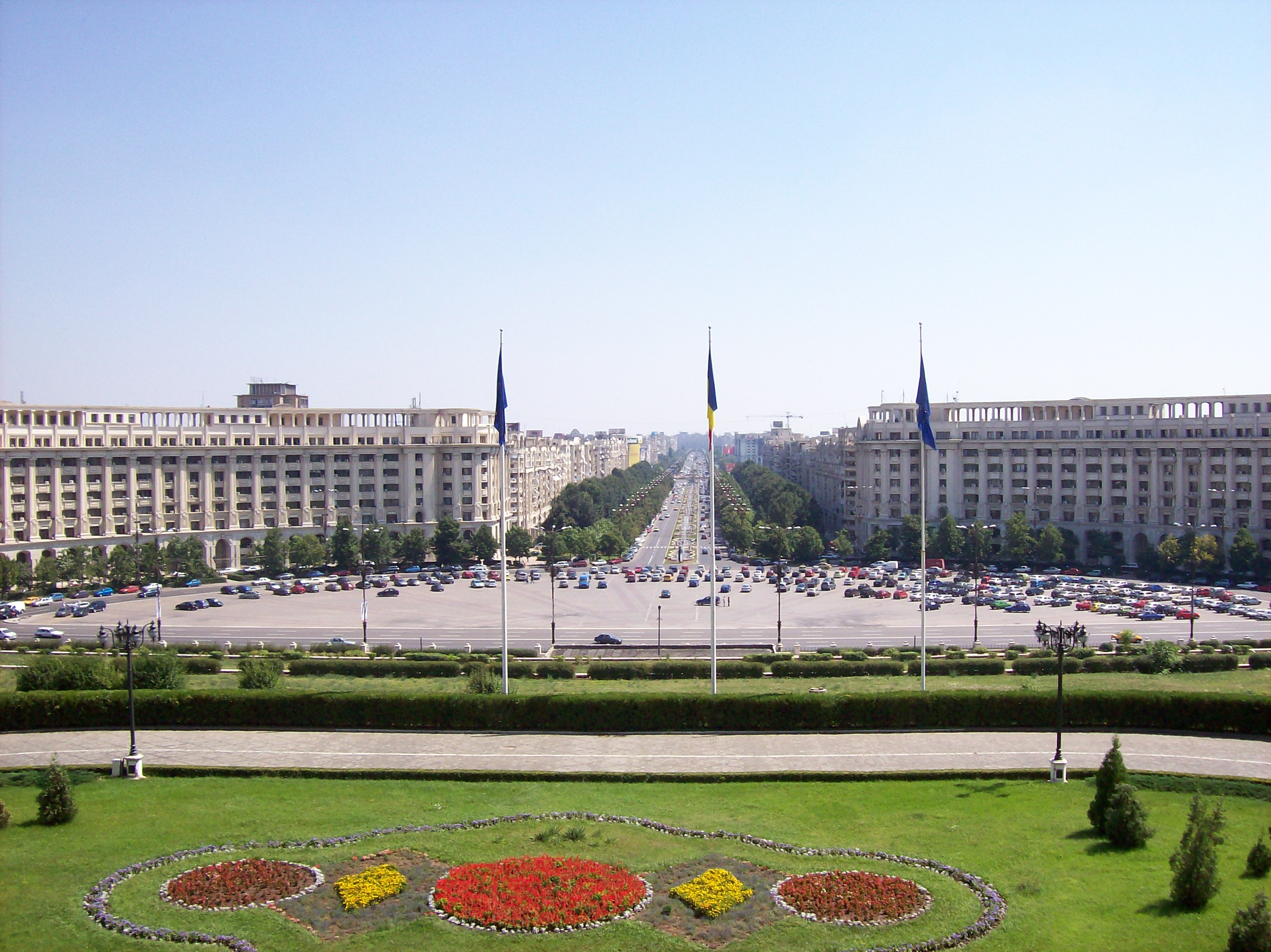
Bulevardul Unirii seen from the Palace of the Parliament with Piața Constituției in foreground

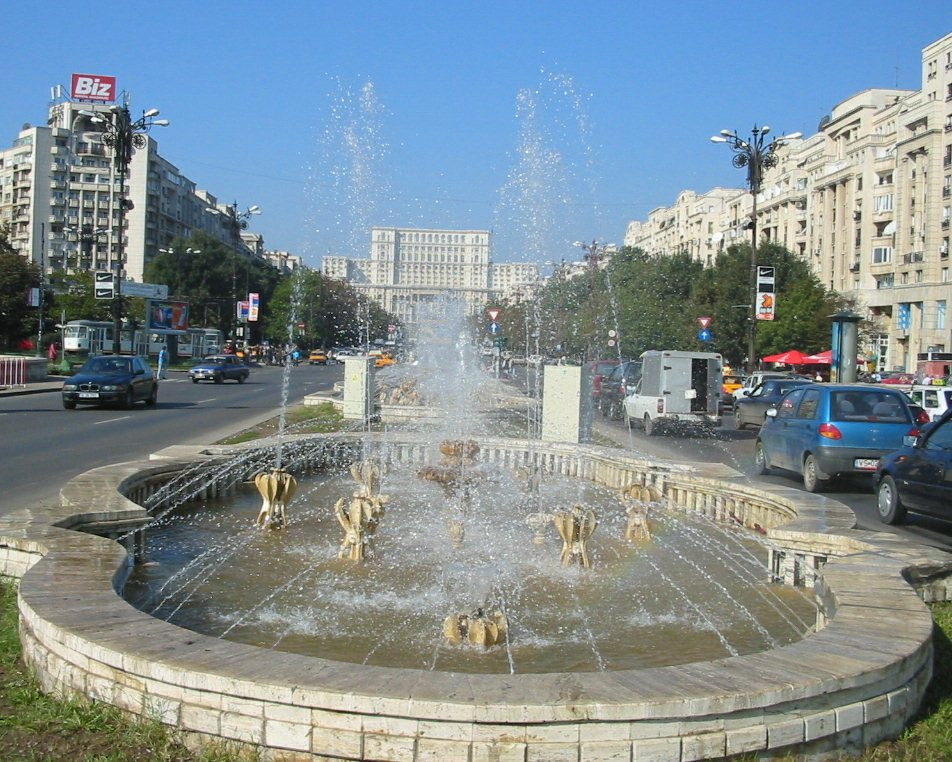
Front view of the Palace of the Parliament

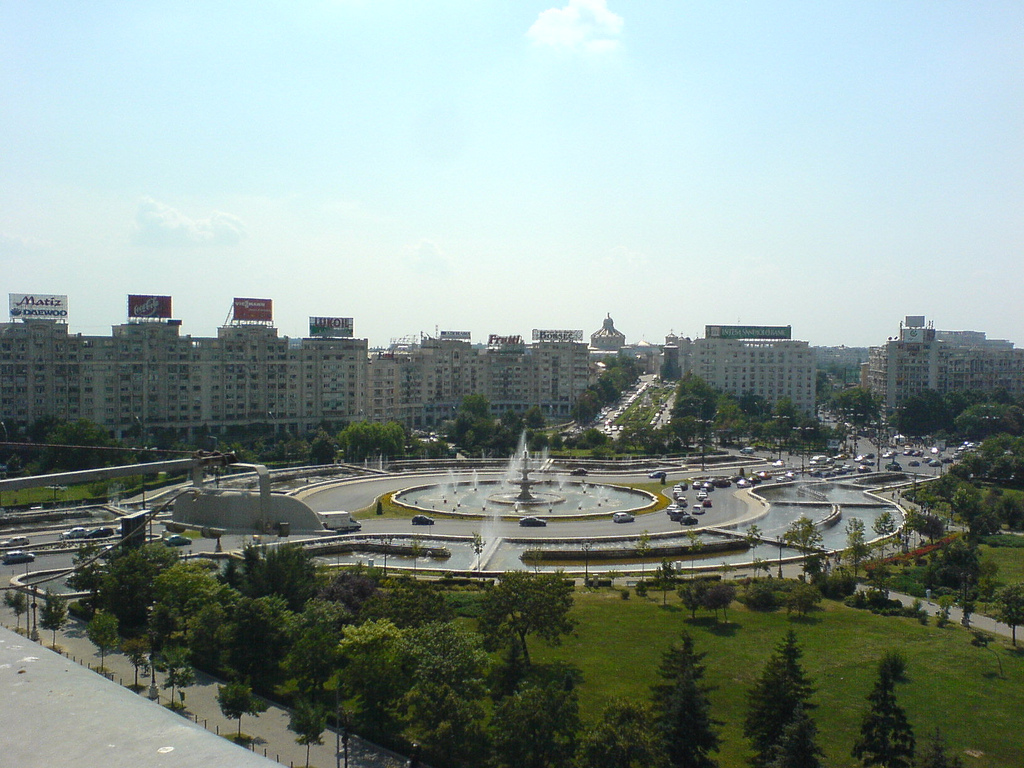
Union Square view to Dealul Mitropoliei

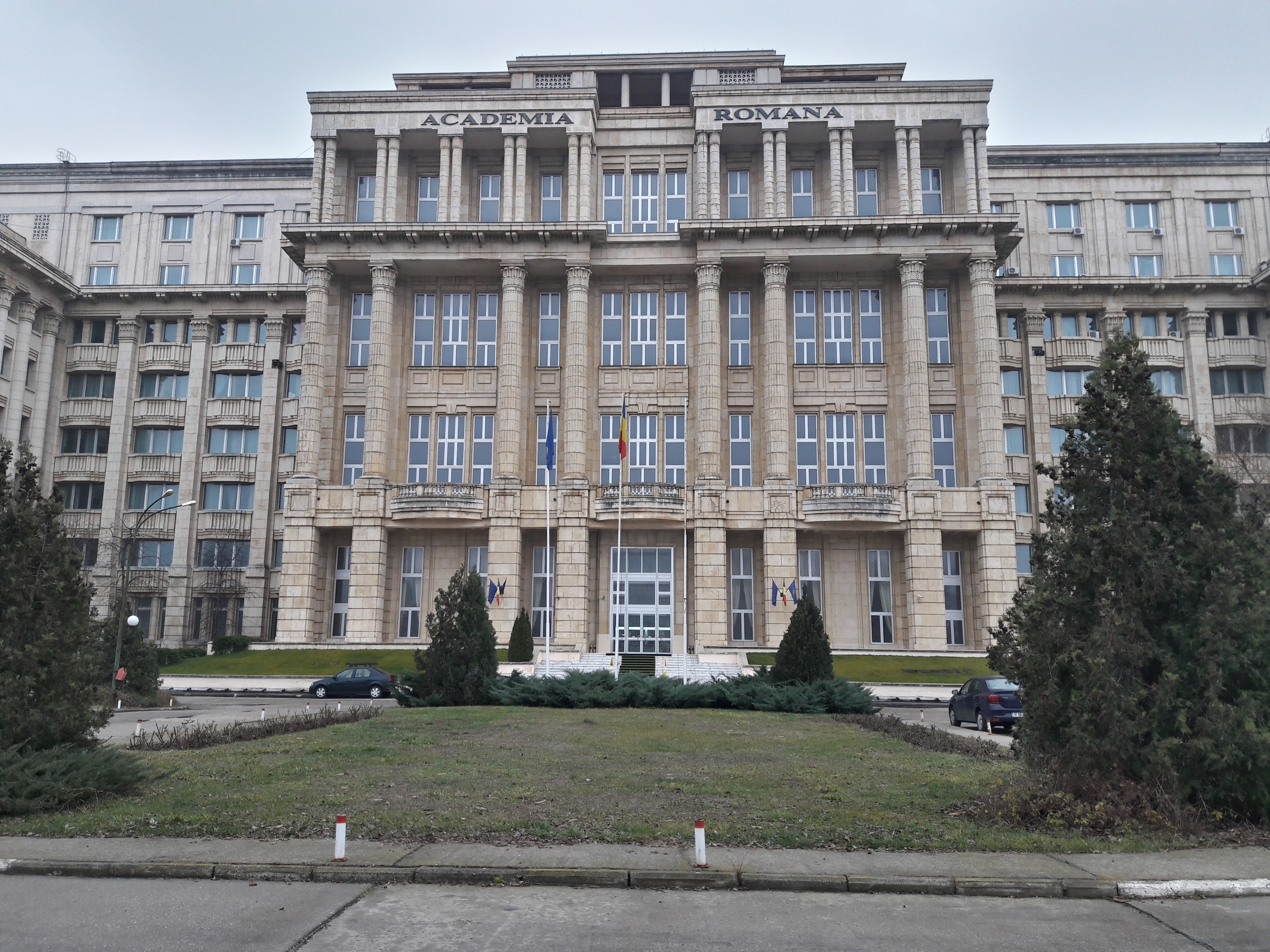
Romanian Academy building

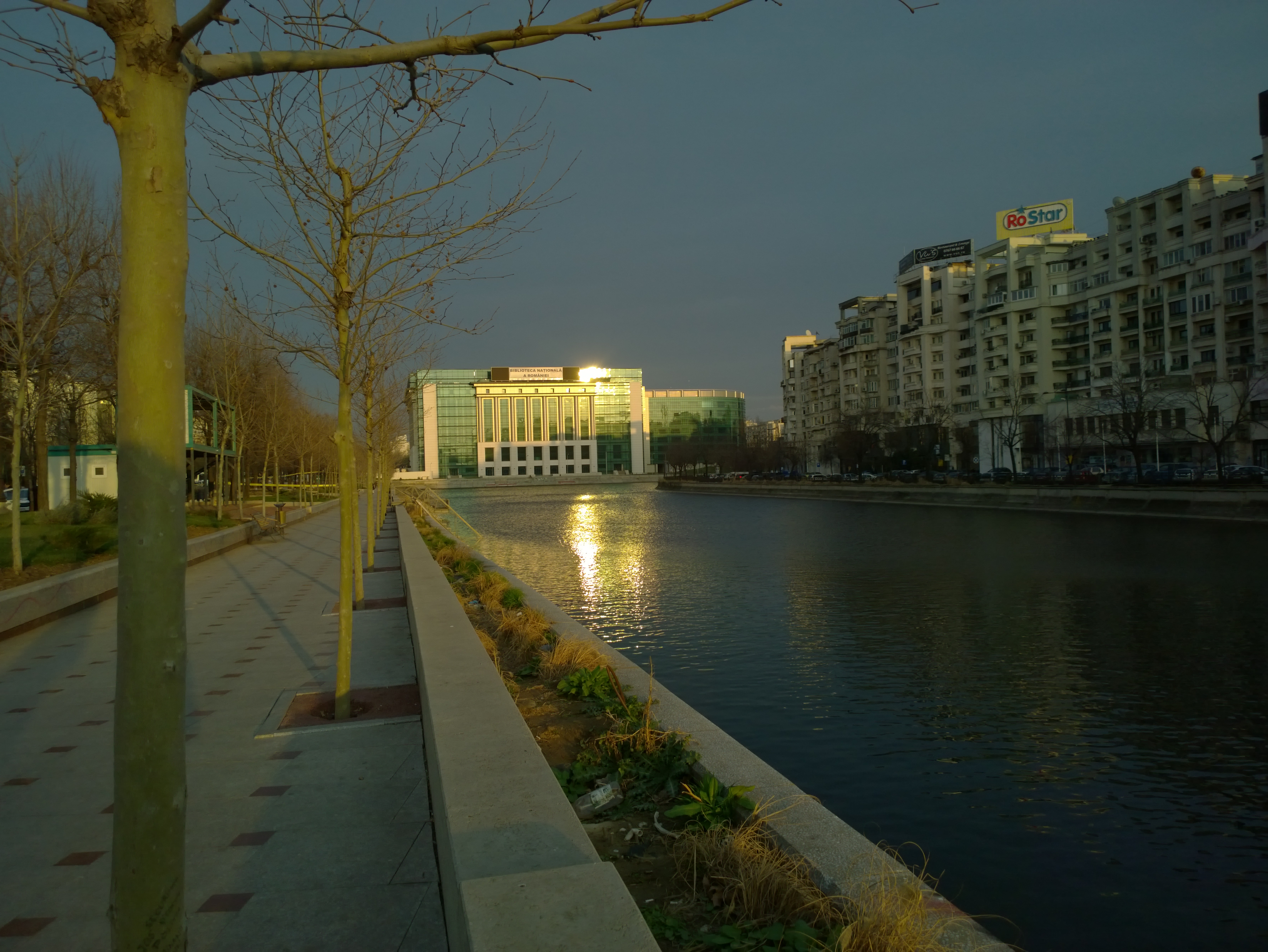
National Library of Romania and Dâmbovița river

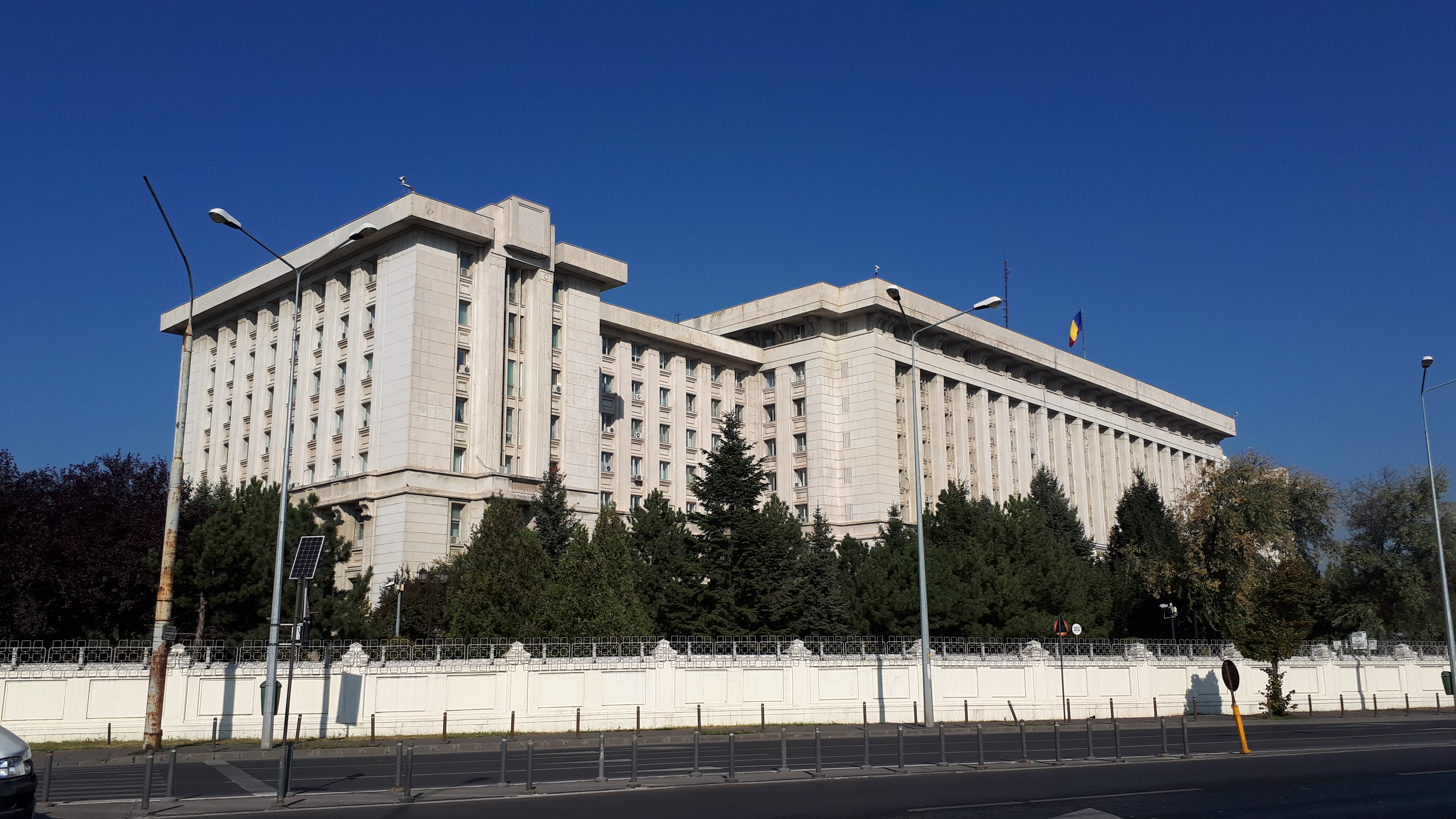
Ministry of National Defense building

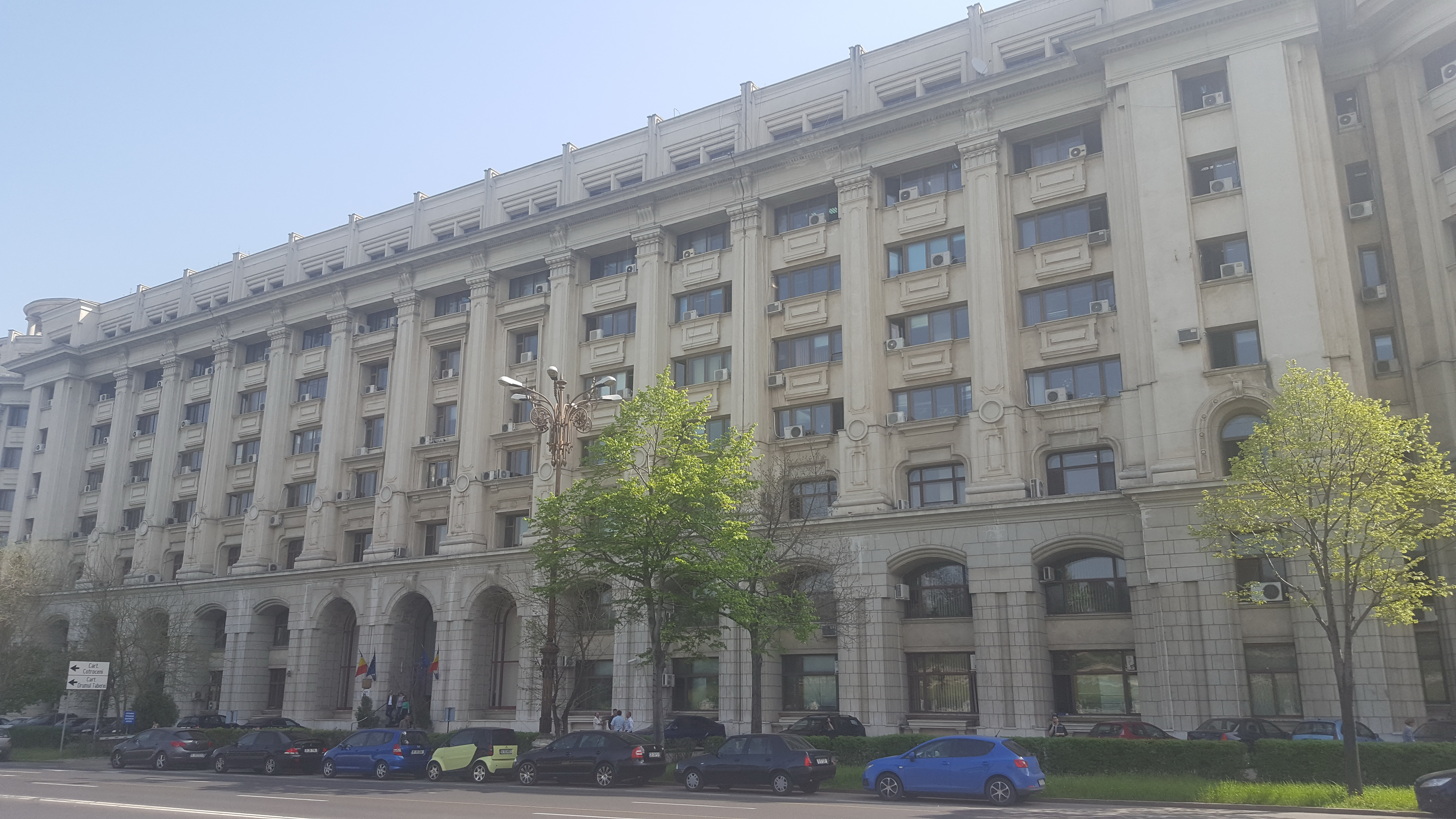
Ministry of Justice building

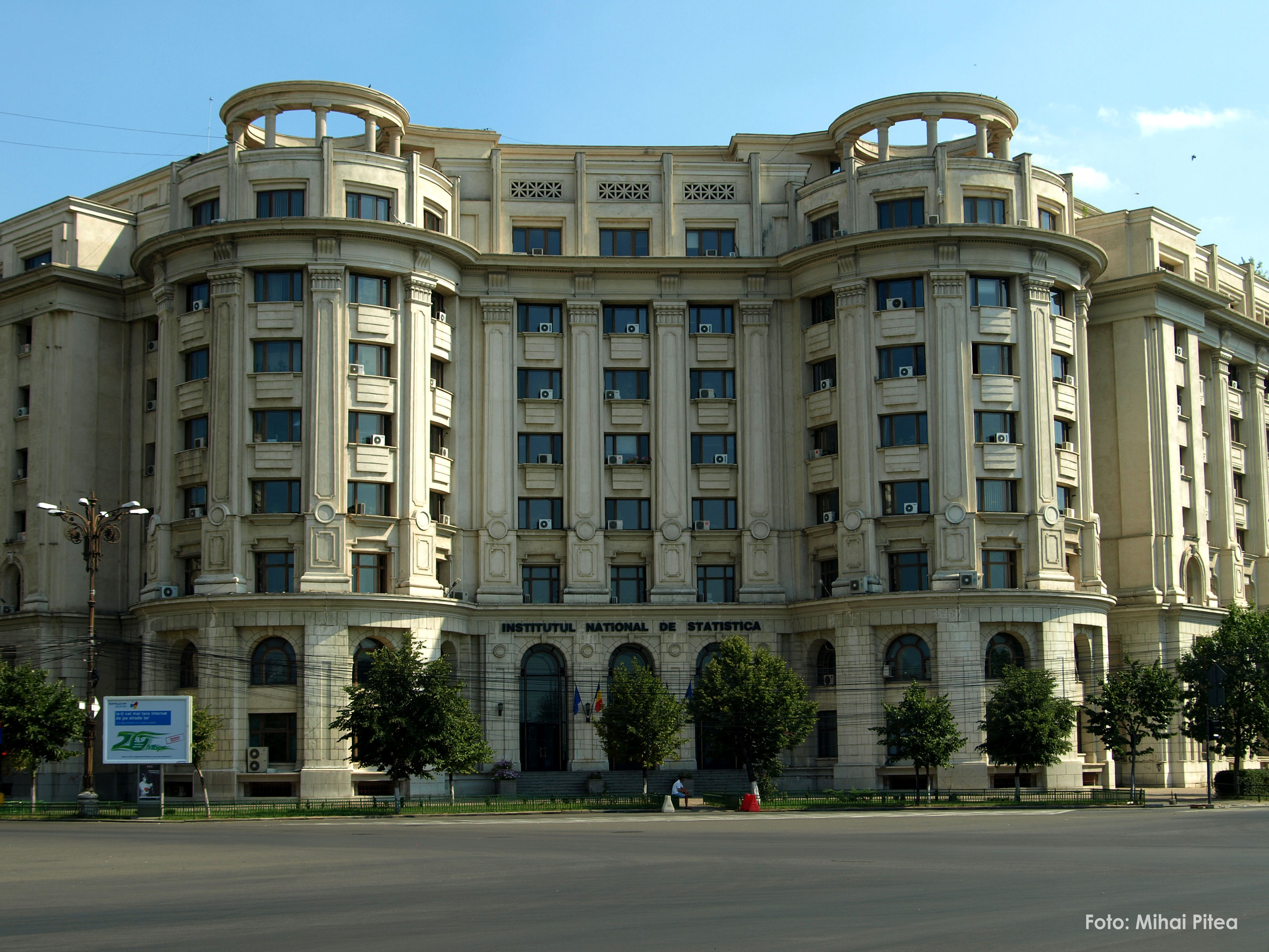
National Institute of Statistics

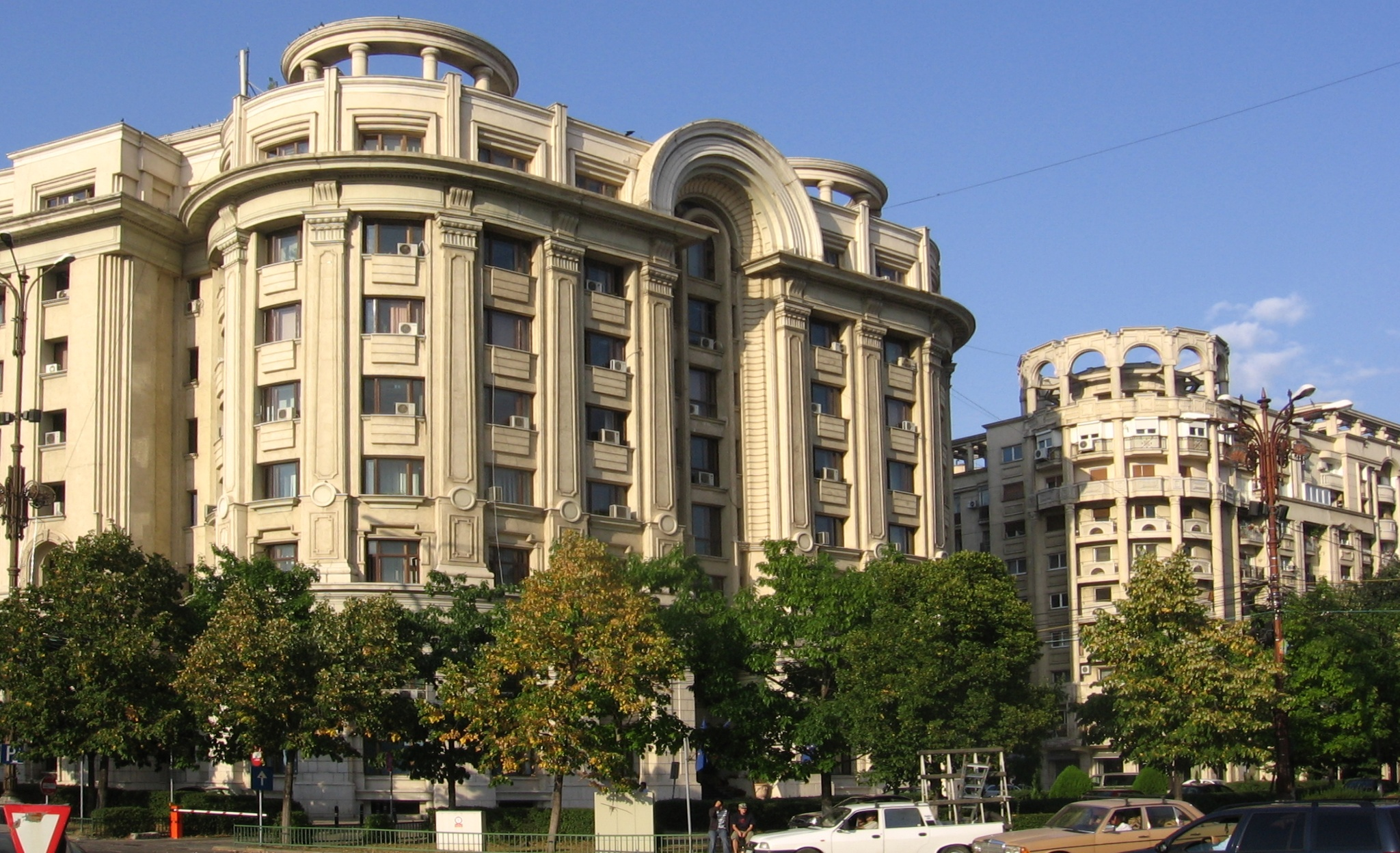
Office (left) and apartment (right) buildings

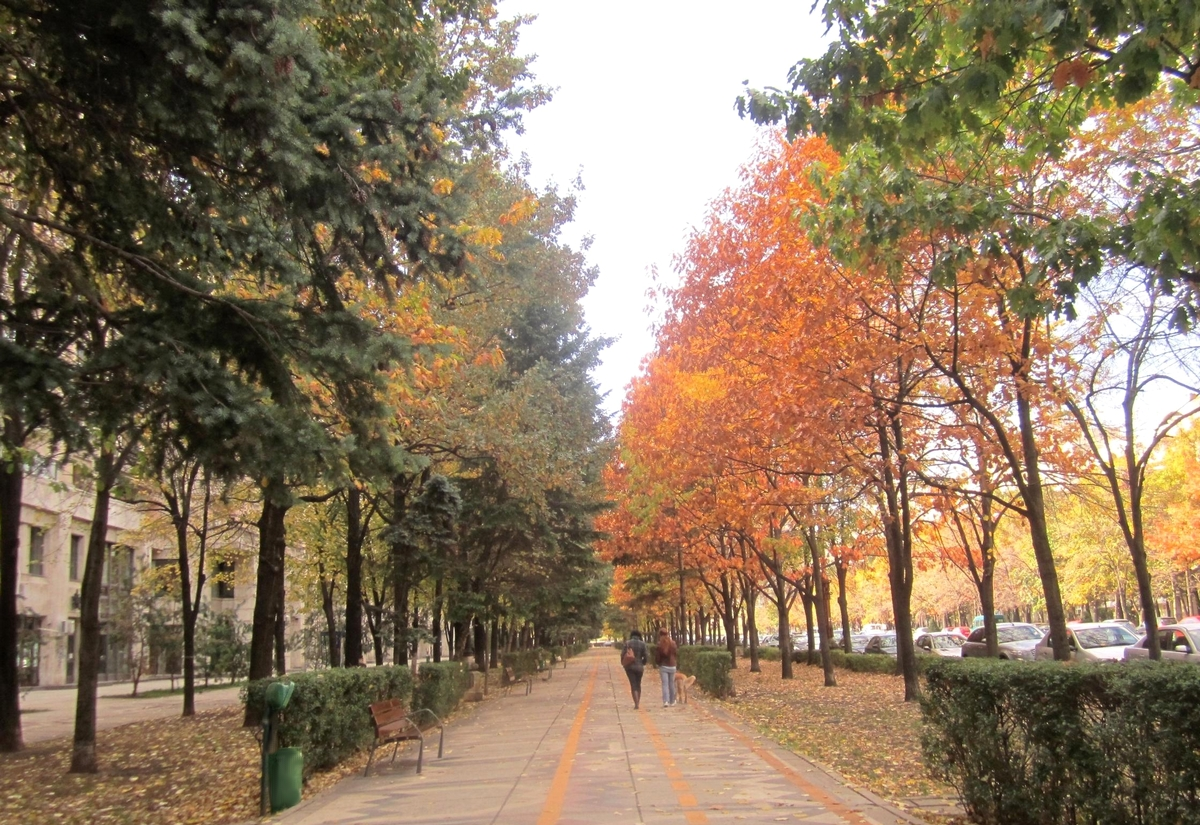
The pedestrian area of Bulevardul Unirii

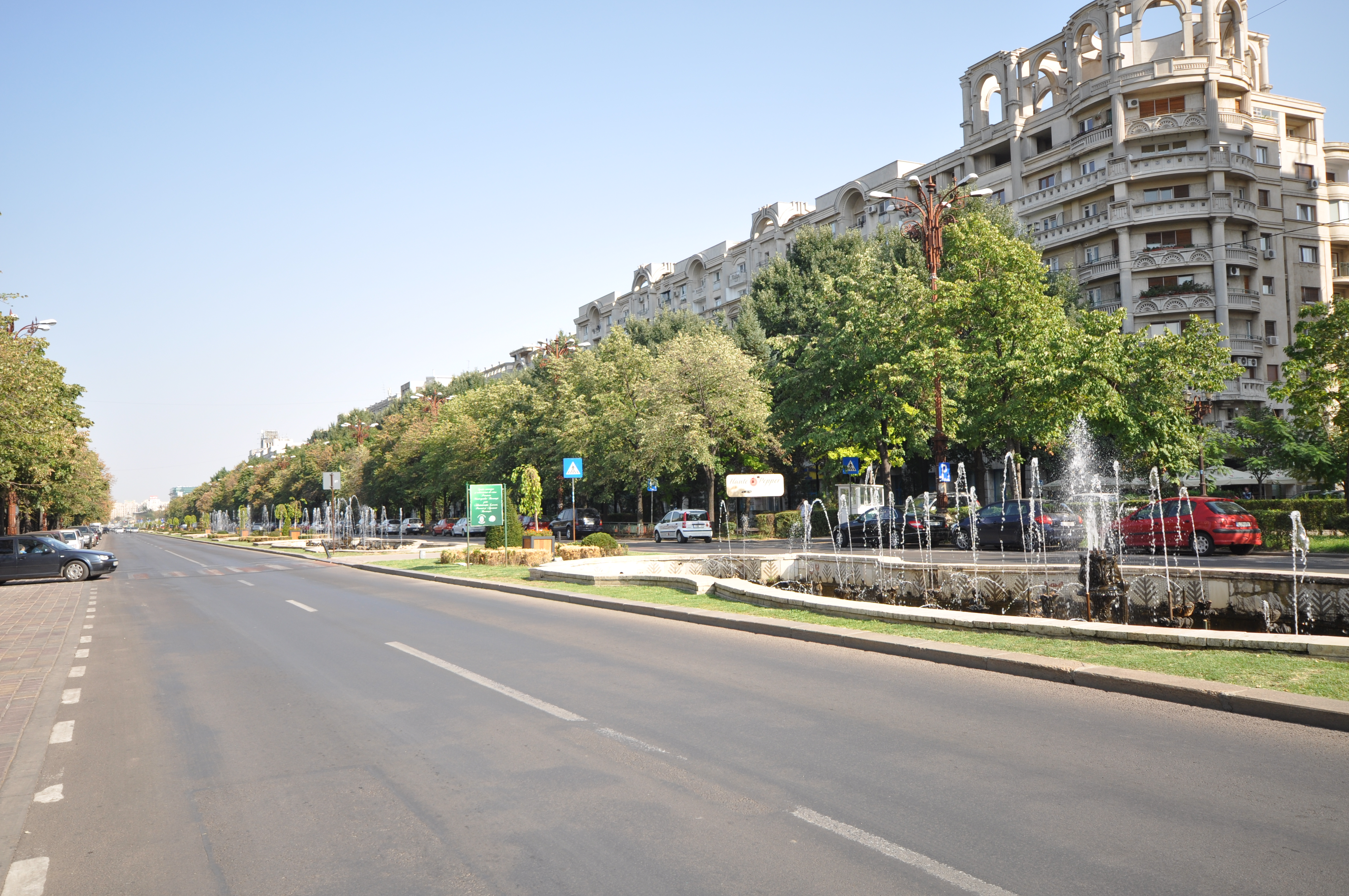
View along the boulevard

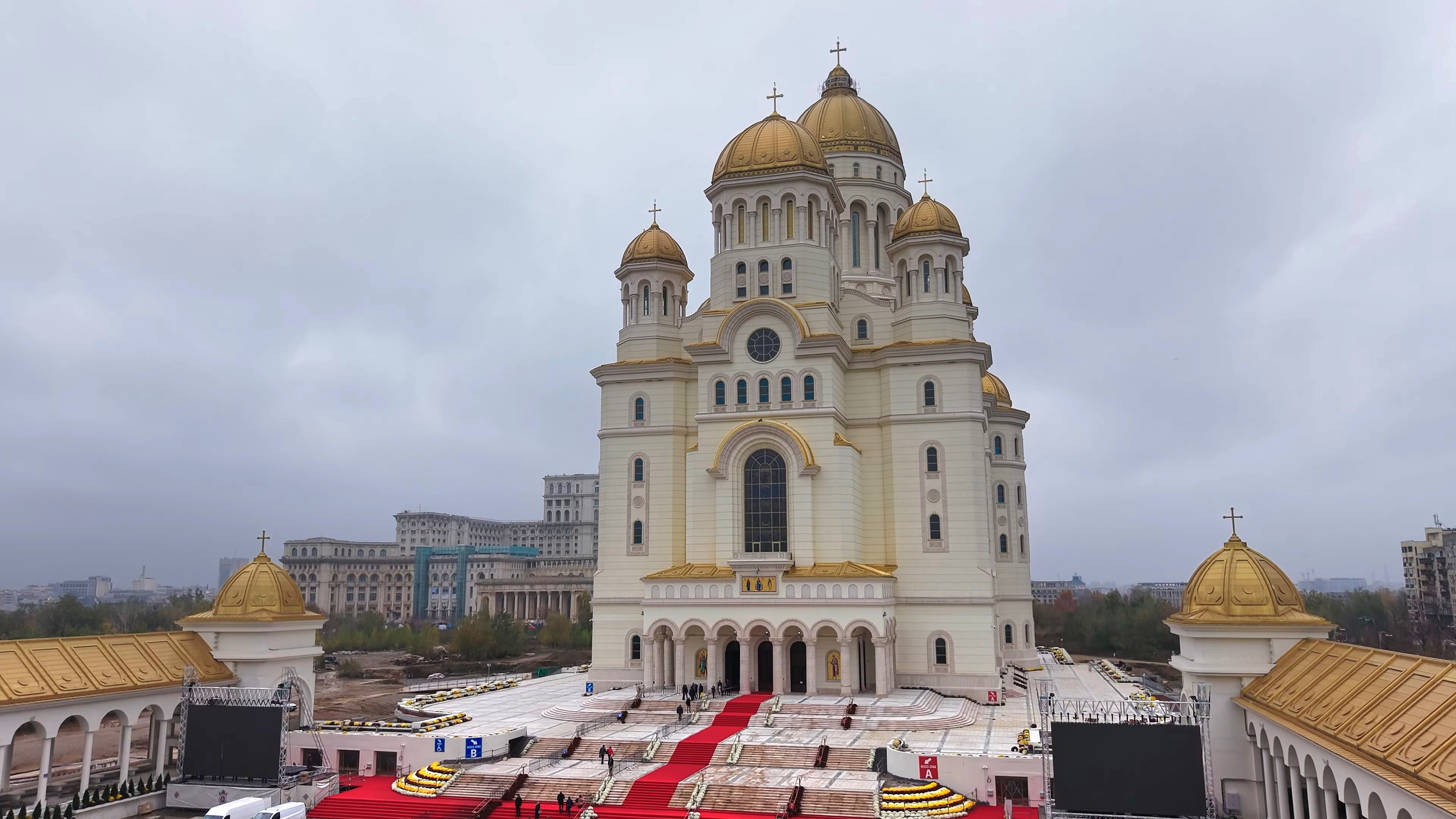
The People's Salvation Cathedral is being built next to the Palace of the Parliament

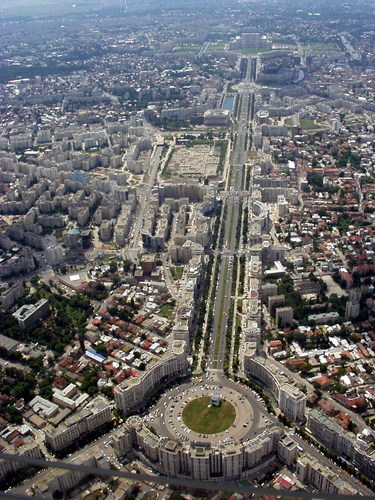
Panoramic view of the boulevard from Alba-Iulia Square

== See also ==
- Dealul Spirii
