= Ceaușima =

Comparison between the policies of Nicolae Ceaușescu to the Hiroshima nuclear attack

Ceaușima (Romanian pronunciation: [tʃe̯a.uˈʃima]) is a vernacular word construction in Romanian sarcastically comparing the policies of former Communist leader Nicolae Ceaușescu to the nuclear attack on Hiroshima. This portmanteau term was coined in the 1980s to describe the huge urban areas of Bucharest that Ceaușescu ordered torn down during the final few years of his tenure. Significant portions of the historic center of Bucharest were demolished to accommodate standardized apartment blocks and government buildings, including the grandiose Centrul Civic and the House of the Republic palace.

The term has also been used to describe other actions of Ceaușescu not linked to the demolition of Bucharest, such as intense pollution in the Transylvanian city of Copșa Mică.

== Systematization ==
Ceaușescu considered it necessary to his program of systematization to demolish vast portions of the historic and central parts of Bucharest and other cities, and replace them with giant representation buildings and high-density standardized apartment blocks. The latter was rooted in the ideology of "edifying the multilaterally developed socialist society" and it was considered an epitome of the Leninist formula of the "fight between old and new" (see Historical materialism).

Started in 1974, and implemented some six years later, the program implied a comprehensive nationwide campaign of demolition, resettlement, and reconstruction. Historian Dinu C. Giurescu writes:

The urban systematization conducted by the communist regime has destroyed 29 traditional towns to 85-90% and also has heavily mutilated other 37 cities, including Bucharest.

The biggest target of the systematization was Bucharest.

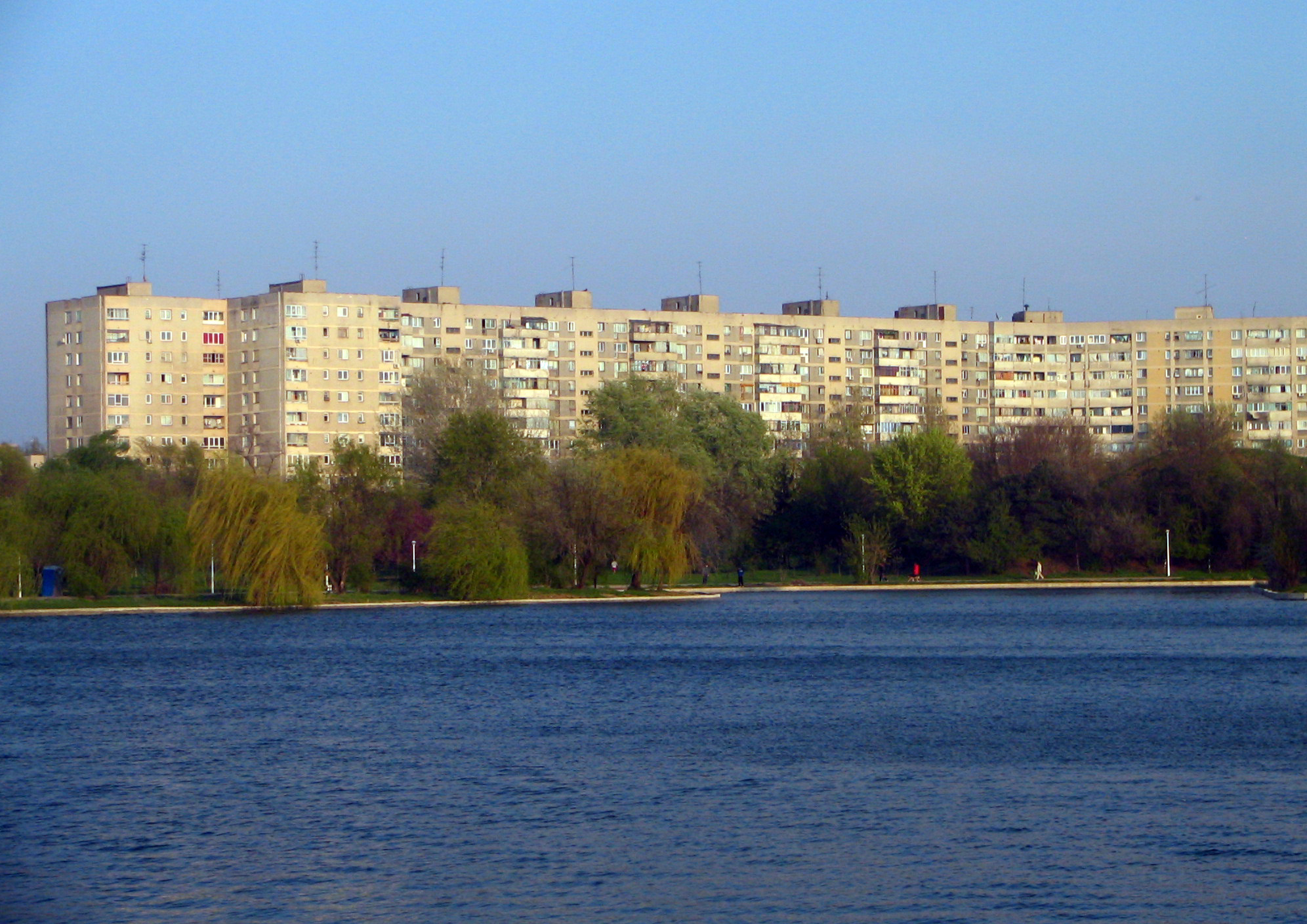
Apartment blocks in Titan

The triggering event of systematization in Bucharest was the major earthquake of 1977, which predominantly struck edifices built before World War II (preceded by another major earthquake, that of November 10, 1940), while the structures dating from the communist era held out well. This was interpreted by the communist regime as a proof of its superiority over the pre-war regimes, and led to a paradigm change in its urban development policy. Up to that time, the communist regime had concentrated on the clearance and redevelopment of slums like Groapa Floreasca or Groapa lui Ouatu (1950s) as well as on new high-density urban settlements in the suburbs, such as Bucureștii Noi (1950s), Balta Albă (later Titan), Berceni, Giurgiului or Drumul Taberei (1960s), while the city remained basically untouched. The impacts of the earthquake, more severe in the central city, provided both ideological and technical arguments for urban intervention in historical Bucharest.

The immediate consequences of this new urban policy were the demolition of monuments like Enei Church (founded 1611, rebuilt 1723; with murals by Gheorghe Tattarescu), the Neo-gothic Casa Cerchez or the elegant Baia Centrală public bath house and the suppression of the Authority for the National Heritage. However, the most pervasive consequence was the commitment of Ceaușescu to accomplish his earlier vision of the monumental Centrul Civic ("civic centre"), which would concentrate and symbolize the emblems of his power.

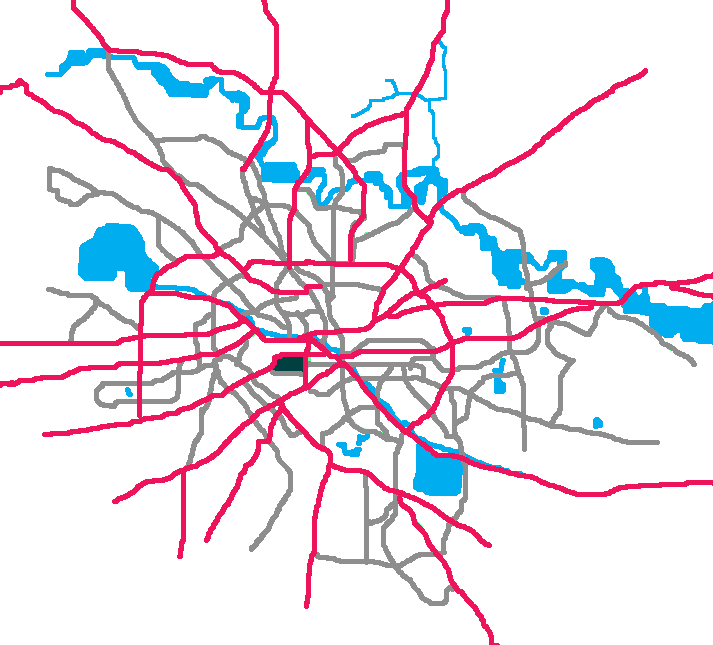
Location of the House of the People in the map of Bucharest.

Though the decision to build the new civic centre in the very heart of Bucharest was made in 1978, it took some six years for Ceaușescu to impose a wide-ranging reshaping. During that period, interventions in historical Bucharest, like rebuilding the traditional Calea Moșilor with uniform concrete apartment blocks, were still carried out respecting the pre-existing urban configuration. This can be explained by the significant opposition the project encountered from a majority of leading experts. To realize his project, Ceaușescu brought together some 400 urban planning professionals, visiting them at least once a week during the 1980s and providing what the press called "valuable instructions" (indicații prețioase) in front of a large scale model of Bucharest.

Since Ceaușescu succeeded in quelling disagreement and opposition expressed by authoritative architects, art historians and intellectuals, a coherent reshaping project never came to light. Instead, through what was largely a step-by-step approach, the implementation of Casa Republicii ("House of the Republic"), now Palatul Parlamentului, ("Palace of the Parliament") could be imposed. The subsequent opening of the oversized Boulevard of the Victory of Socialism was but the consequence of architectural requirements aiming at creating a congruent perspective to the colossal House of the People. The final result was compared to both the Pyongyang of Kim Il Sung and Adolf Hitler's Germania.

After the project had been officially finalised, the frequent interventions of Ceaușescu continued to modify the situation on the ground, leading mostly to further demolitions.

The mass destructions in Bucharest began in 1983 and continued until late 1988. Construction was very intense during the first year, so that in June 1984 the Ceaușescus could inaugurate the workings of what would become the House of the People.

== Areas of demolition ==
The destroyed urban areas extended over several informal districts (cartiere), some of exceptional architectural and/or historical significance. Since both the urban project and its execution were much of a trial-and-error process, demolitions were often arbitrary. However, a certain west to east pattern of demolition can be ascertained: the western area of Uranus as well as approximately 92% of the adjoining eastern area of Văcărești were destroyed, while the areas situated farther east like Dudești and Theodor Speranția were demolished only along the large boulevards which had to be created there.

=== Uranus area ===
The Uranus district was the foremost target of the flattening, since it had an exceptional geographic value, being situated on the most prominent hill in Bucharest; this was where the House of the People was to be placed. The hill on which the Uranus city district was located, called Dealul Spirii, was radically reshaped in order to make it bear the House of the People. Another hill belonging to the Uranus area, of lesser dimensions, was the Mihai Vodă Hill.

The destruction of the Uranus area reached the shore of the Dâmbovița River (Splaiul Independenței) on the north side, the streets Hașdeu and Isvor on the east side, Sabinelor and Calea Rahovei streets on the south side, cutting a straight line of some 1,200 meters on the north-south axis through a dense urban area along the streets Bateriilor and Logofătul Nestor. Other important streets of the Uranus district were: Uranus, Mihai Vodă, Puțul cu Apă Rece, Cazărmii, Militari, Schitul Maicilor, Banul Mihalcea, Meteorilor, Minotaurului, Arionoaia. The entire demolished area covered approximately 154 hectares.

The Uranus neighbourhood is remembered for its special atmosphere; the area was both residential and monumental: many elegant houses and villas, as well as some low-density apartments blocks constructed in the late 19th and early 20th centuries, coexisted with salient historical and architectural monuments. Thus, the fortified Mihai Vodă Monastery, founded by the Wallachian prince Michael the Brave in 1589-1591, and housing the State Archives since 1866, was pulled down. Moreover, the entire Mihai Vodă Hill has been leveled to open the view on the House of the People, while the Mihai Vodă Church was moved to a new location nestled between concrete blocks of flats.

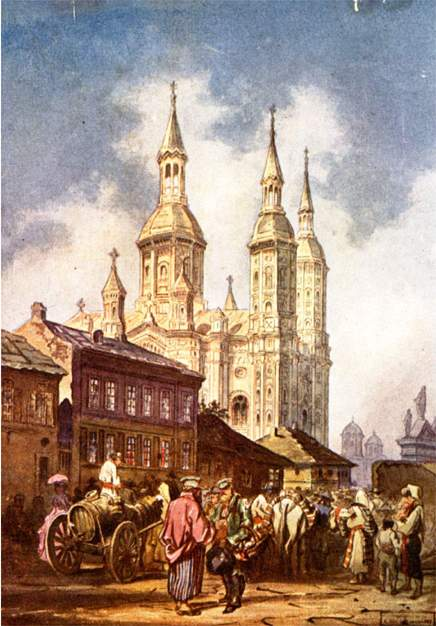
The Saint Spiridon church in 1860. This is the New Saint Spiridon church, which still exists, not the demolished Old Saint Spiridon church.

Among other edifices of cultural and/or historical significance torn down in the Uranus area were: the Central Military Museum, the old Arsenal, the Art deco Stadium of the Republic (1926), the Army Theatre, Casa Demetriade, the Operetta Theatre, the Higher Education Institute for Physical Education, the Athletes' Hospital, the Lahovary Fountain and the "Isvor" open air bath. Among the churches torn down in the Uranus district were included: the Albă Postăvari Church (donated in 1568 by a Doamna Caplea), the Spirea Veche Church (founded by a doctor Spiridon Christofi in 1765), the Isvorul Tămăduirii Church (a guilds' foundation of 1794), and the Old Saint Spiridon Church (1668).

The demolition of the churches was done with the approval of the Romanian Orthodox Church leaders. For instance, in 1989, Bishop Nifon answered the questions of western reporters by claiming the churches demolished had not much historical interest and they were too close to others.

Relocating churches and cutting them off from their architectural and cultural context to be reinserted into a narrowing neighbourhood is another expression of the strategy that created "Ceaușima". Some examples of churches that were relocated: the Saint Ilie Rahova Church (1745), the Schitul Maicilor Church (1726), the Domnița Bălașa Church (founded in 1751 by Bălașa Lambrino, daughter of Constantin Brâncoveanu), the Sfântul Ioan Nou Church (18th century) and the entire outstanding monastic complex of Antim Monastery (1713–1715). A similar type of urban intervention cut entire quarters out of their surroundings. Thus, the city area located south of the Dâmbovița between Podul Isvor and Piața Unirii and up to Antim Monastery was hedged in by a large triangle of standardized concrete blocks of flats.

=== Piața Unirii ===
The creation of the huge Boulevard of Socialism's Victory imposed additional demolitions in areas adjacent to the Uranus district. Piața Unirii was doubled in size. Excepting the Art Nouveau metal structure of the Halele Unirii allegedly built by Gustave Eiffel, the most notable demolition in this area was the Brâncovenesc Hospital (Așezămintele Brâncovenești – Brâncoveanu's Foundations, founded in 1835 by Safta Brâncoveanu) – an architectural monument and one of the most venerable, most ample and best-equipped medical institutions of Bucharest and Romania.

=== Văcărești area ===
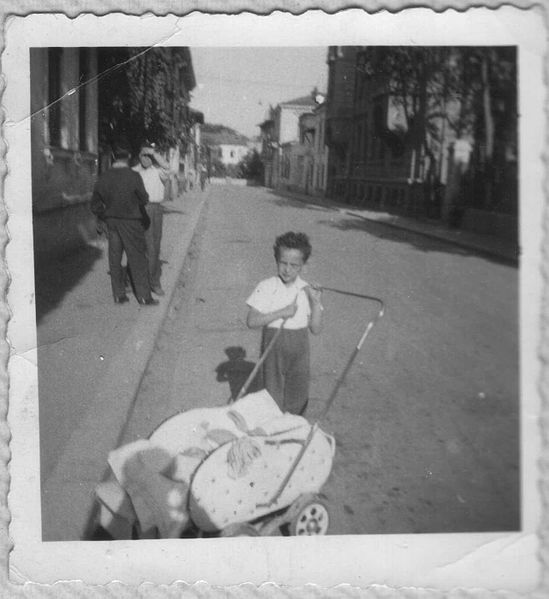
Strada Haiducul Bujor, connecting Calea Văcărești and Strada Olteni (1959 photograph)

Located eastwards of Piața Unirii, the Văcărești area definitely belonged to the old Bucharest. The demolished area was located between Calea Călărașilor on the north, the shore of the Dâmbovița on the west and south sides, and Mircea Vodă and Calea Văcăreștilor streets in the east. The architecture of the area was eclectic, bearing witness to successive cultural and historical strata, which resulted in a mixture of 18th- to 19th-century edifices (inns, stores) and more recent buildings from the early 20th century. Other significant streets of this area were: Căuzași, Olteni, Iuliu Barasch, Banul Mărăcine, Sf. Ioan Nou, Mămulari, Sfânta Vineri, Negru Vodă, Haiducul Bujor, Clucerul Udricani, Pitagora. The total area razed covered approximately 66 hectares.

Among the most notable destroyed edifices were: the Sfânta Vineri-Herasca Church (founded in 1645), Olteni Church (1696), the historical Vechea Agie (Old Police Prefecture), the Paediatrics Hospital, the Mina Minovici Forensic Institute, the Al. I. Cuza College, the monumental Courthouse of the 4th District, the historical Town Hall of the former Blue Sector, several old inns and stores (underneath a UU-shaped commercial complex dating from the mid-19th century) and other characteristic edifices. Unlike in the Uranus area, a very few buildings could be rescued; these included two synagogues in Mămulari Street, the little Udricani Church and the neighbouring State Jewish Theatre, formerly the Barașeum Theatre, on Iuliu Barasch Street.

=== Dudești area ===
Dudești is situated eastwards of Văcărești. Before the 1980s, its boundaries ran along Matei Basarab and Labirint streets on the north, Popa Nan and Th. Speranța streets on the east side, Moruzi Voevod and Papazoglu streets in the south, Olteni and Mircea Vodă streets on the west side. The central axis of the district ran along the streets Calea Dudești and Avraam Goldfaden, with other important streets being Traian, Nerva Traian, Bradului, and Dr. Popper.

While the central part of the district has been completely bulldozed to clear the way for the Boulevard of the Victory of Socialism, its northern and southern sections suffered to a lesser extent. The urban texture of the district was characteristic of housing patterns of the late 19th-early 20th century, consisting of family houses set along old tree-lined streets. Neo-classical ornaments, typical for middle class residences, were more frequent in the northern zone of the neighbourhood, while more modest dwelling structures prevailed in the southern area, where lower middle classes lived. Both the Dudești and Văcărești neighbourhoods were also notable for a traditional and significant Jewish presence. The total area razed covered approximately 110 hectares.

=== Theodor Speranția area ===
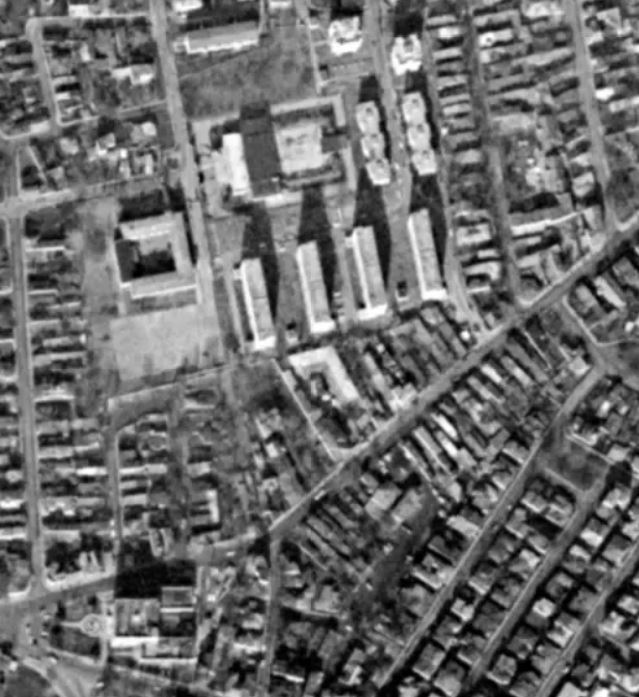
The four slab-tower blocks (top) that were affected by the demolition program, as seen in 1976

The Theodor Speranția area was a residential area from the interwar period, mixing middle with lower class dwelling structures. As in the case of Dudești, this neighbourhood was only partially erased. The total demolished surface was of approximately 50 hectares. However the urban planners of the era were so desperate to reach their goals that they proceeded to demolish a segment of a school building, an entire tower block (with both of its staircases) and partially another three tower blocks (only one of the two staircases).

== Summarizing "Ceaușima" ==
The areas completely destroyed amounted to some 380 hectares (940 acres). In fact, the destroyed urban substance was more considerable, if isolated building clusters and town spots are added, such as the partial demolition of Știrbei Vodă street. Another outstanding example is the destruction of the vast monastic complex of Văcărești (1722) and of the Pantelimon Monastery (1750). Overall, the bulldozed area was approximately five kilometres long by one kilometre wide. It was one of the largest peacetime urban destructions at the hands of humans in recorded history. The bombardments of Bucharest and the 1977 earthquake together caused only 18% of the damage produced by the demolition campaign in the 1980s. Out of the 500 hectares accounted as "Ceaușima", 250 hectares were urban districts of historical significance, representing some 20–25% of historic Bucharest.

Among other destroyed monuments were 27 Orthodox Christian churches (counting eight relocated churches), six synagogues and Jewish temples, and three Protestant churches.

== See also ==
- Urban planning in communist countries
