= Union Boulevard =

Union Boulevard may refer to:

- State Route 1002 (Lehigh County, Pennsylvania), United States
- Union Boulevard, St. Louis, see Central West End, St. Louis, United States
- Union Boulevard, Bay Shore, Suffolk County, New York, see County Route 50 (Suffolk County, New York), United States
- Bulevardul Unirii, Bucharest, Romania
