= Bulevardul Unirii =

Street in Bucharest, Romania

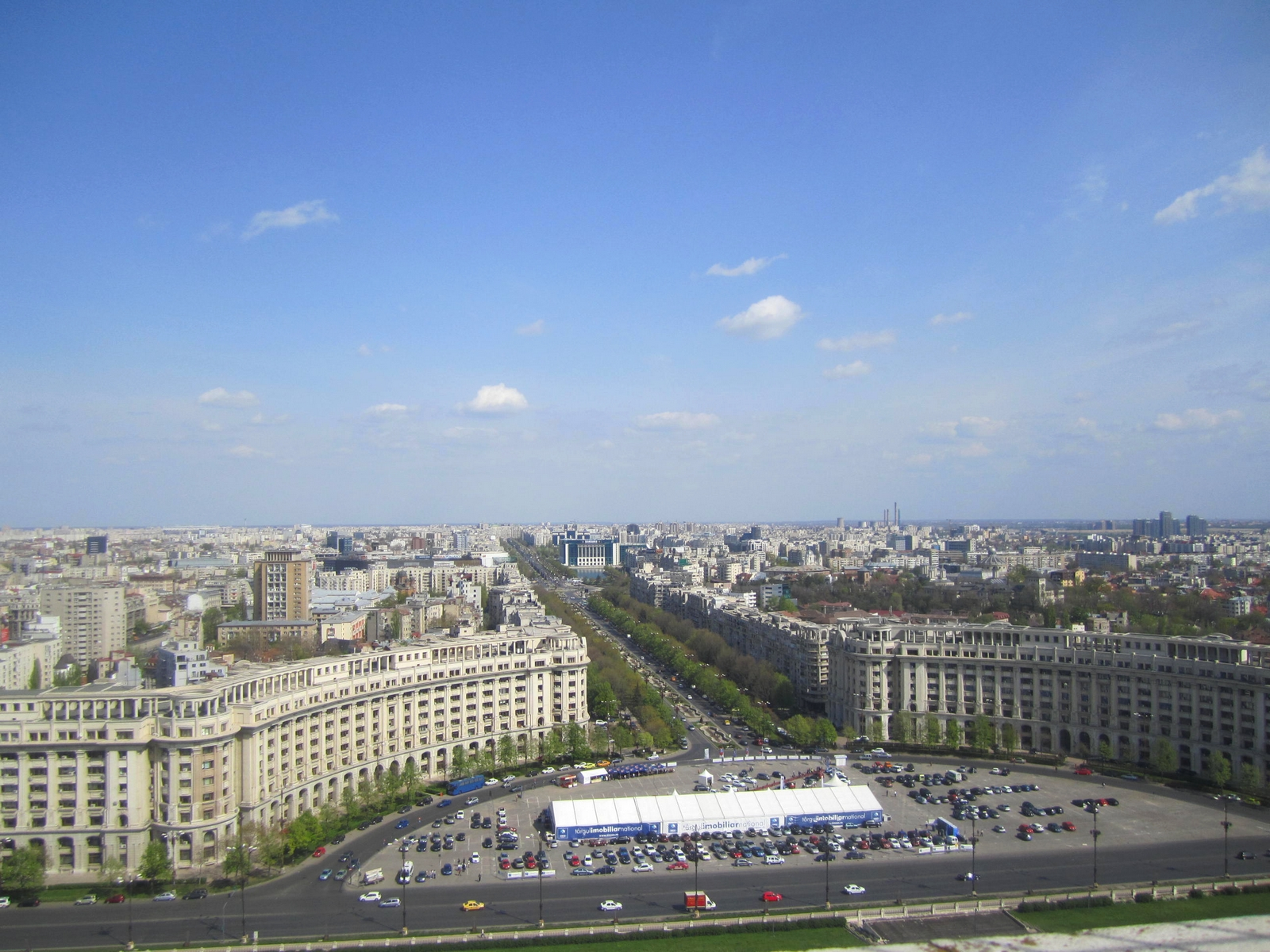
- View of the boulevard from the Palace of the Parliament

- Location within Bucharest
- Length: 2,800 m (9,200 ft)
- Width: 92 m (302 ft)
- Nearest metro station: Piața Unirii
- Coordinates: 44°25′35″N 26°6′46″E
- From: Piața Constituției
- To: Piața Alba Iulia

Bulevardul Unirii (Romanian: [buleˈvardul uˈnirij], Union Boulevard) is a major thoroughfare in central Bucharest, Romania. It connects Constitution Square (Piața Constituției) with Alba Iulia Square (Piața Alba Iulia), and also runs through Union Square (Piața Unirii). The Constitution Square end features the Palace of the Parliament, which began construction simultaneously with the boulevard as an architectural unit.

== History ==
Following the 1977 Vrancea earthquake, Bucharest's city center suffered significant damage, and a large number of historic buildings were demolished to make way for the new Centrul Civic (Civic Center). As part of the project, Bulevardul Unirii was to be Communist Romania's answer to Paris's Avenue des Champs-Élysées. Construction began on June 25, 1984. Initially called Bulevardul Victoria Socialismului (Victory of Socialism Boulevard), the road is lined with apartment blocks and various public buildings of socialist-realism inspiration.

On the large abandoned construction site in the eastern part of the boulevard, a new National Theater was planned to be built by Nicolae Ceaușescu. Only the foundations were completed before the Romanian Revolution of 1989.

== Transport ==
The boulevard is served by Piața Unirii metro station at Union Square.

== Gallery ==
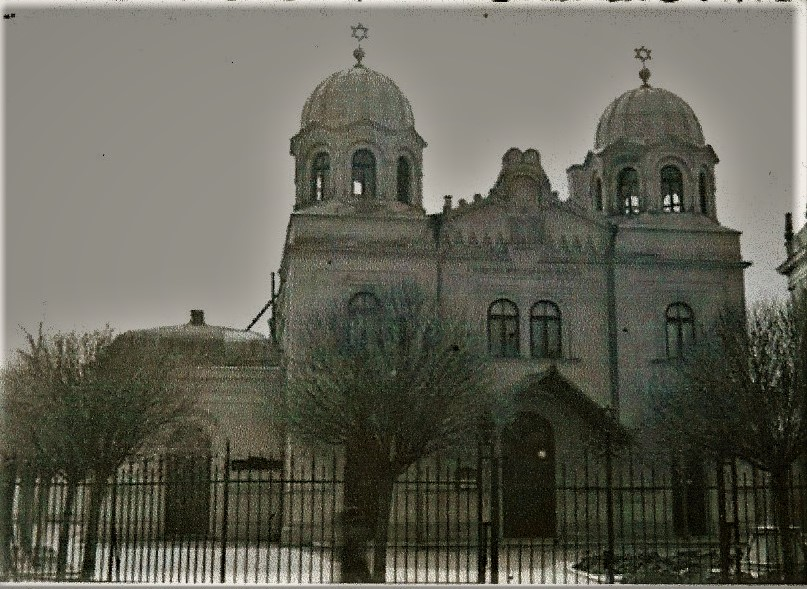
The "Cahal Grande" synagogue, located on 12 Negru Vodă Street. Built 1818, demolished 1985

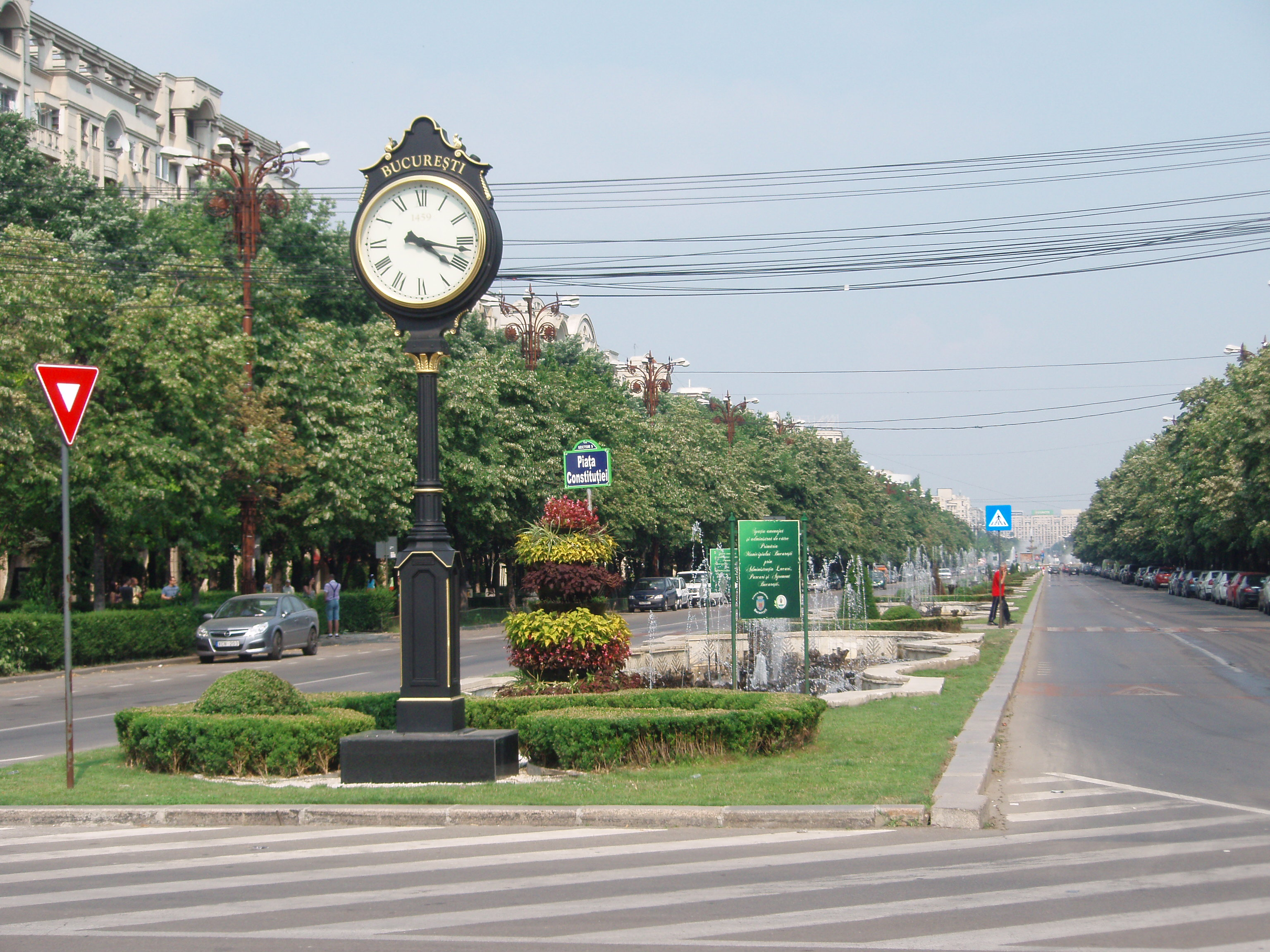
The boulevard looking east from Piața Constituției

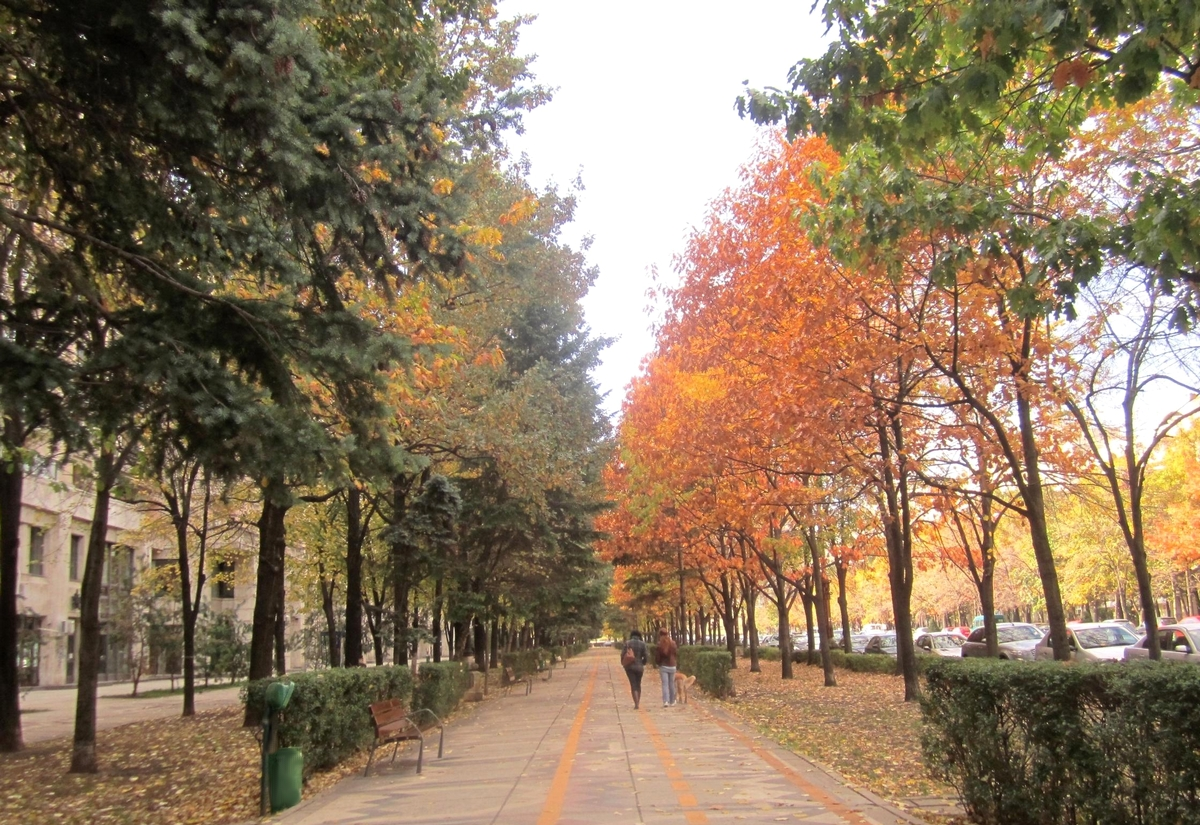
The sidewalk area

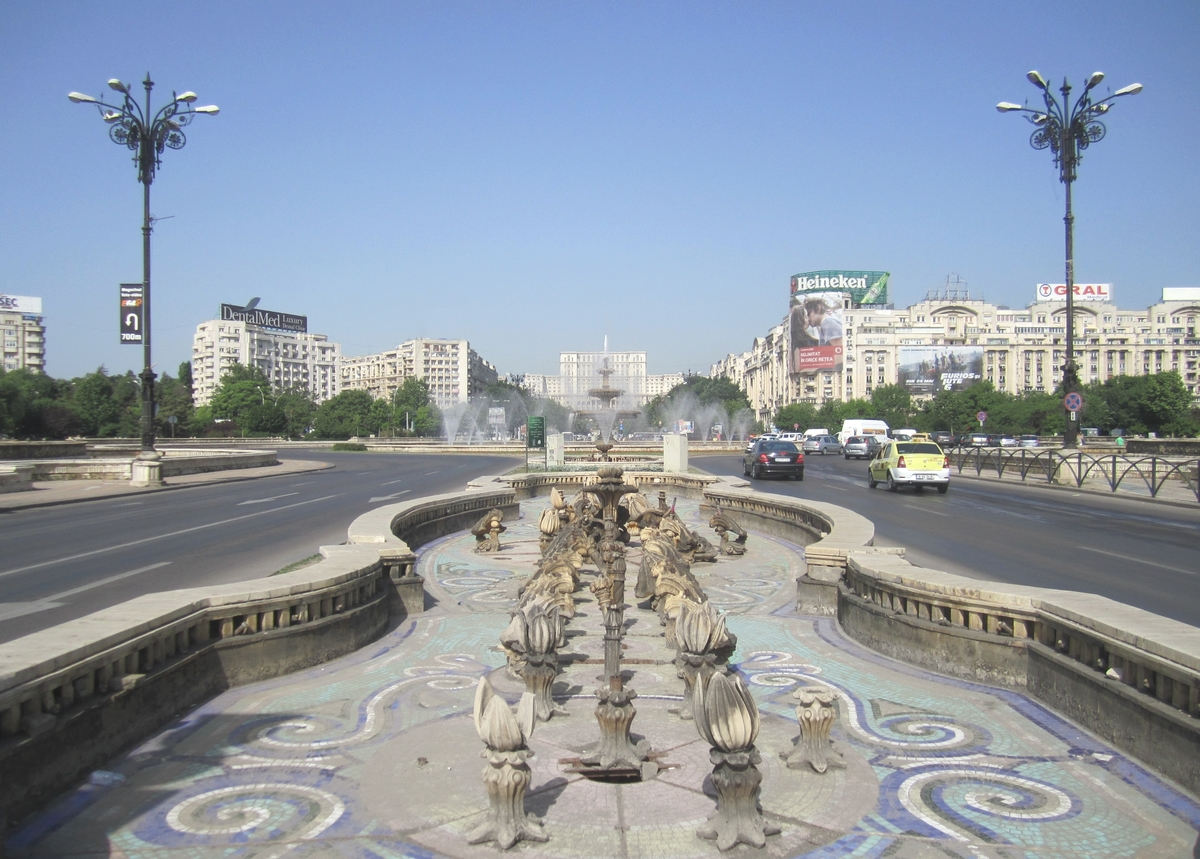
The Palace of the Parliament as seen from Piața Unirii

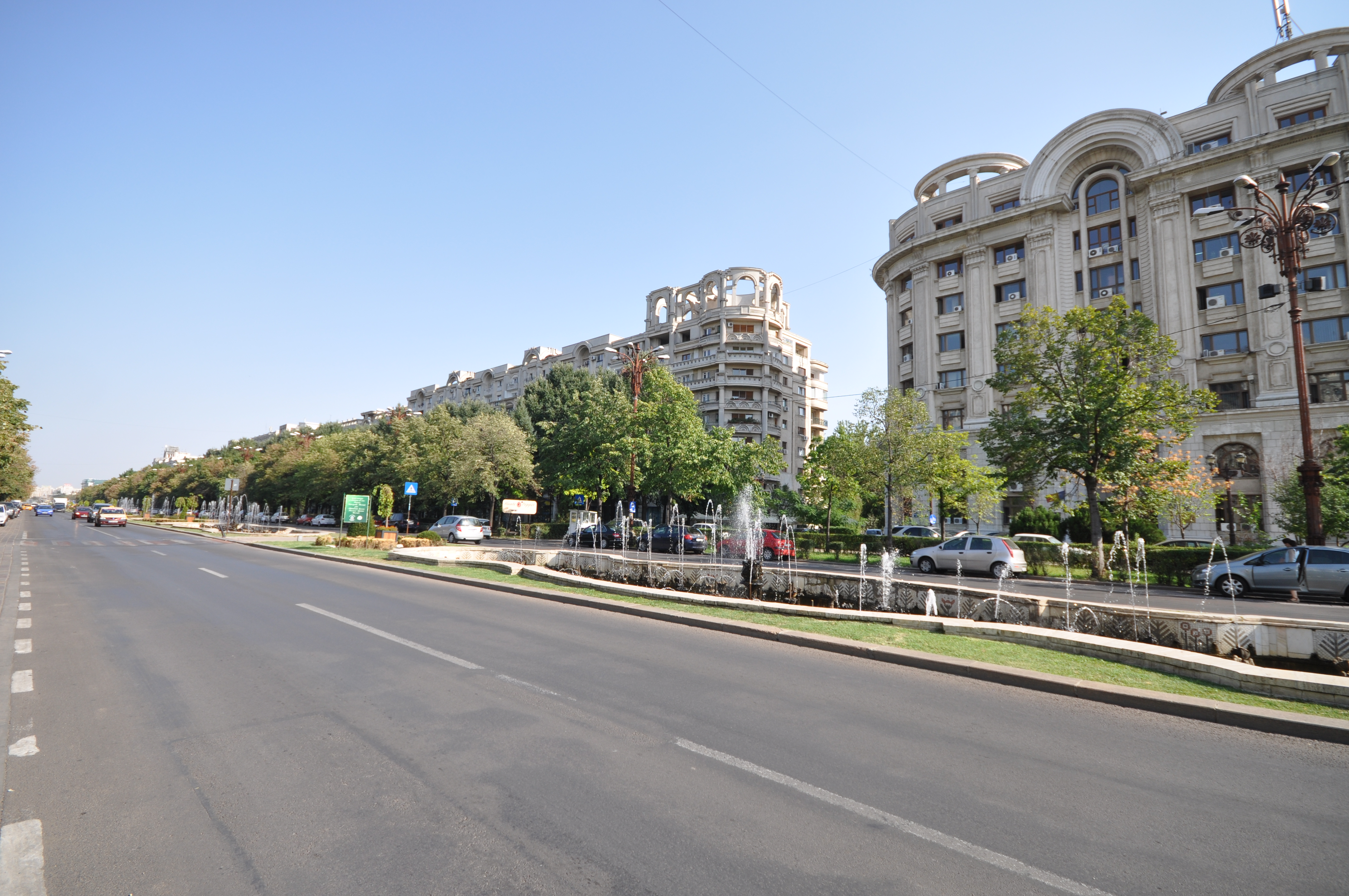
View along the boulevard

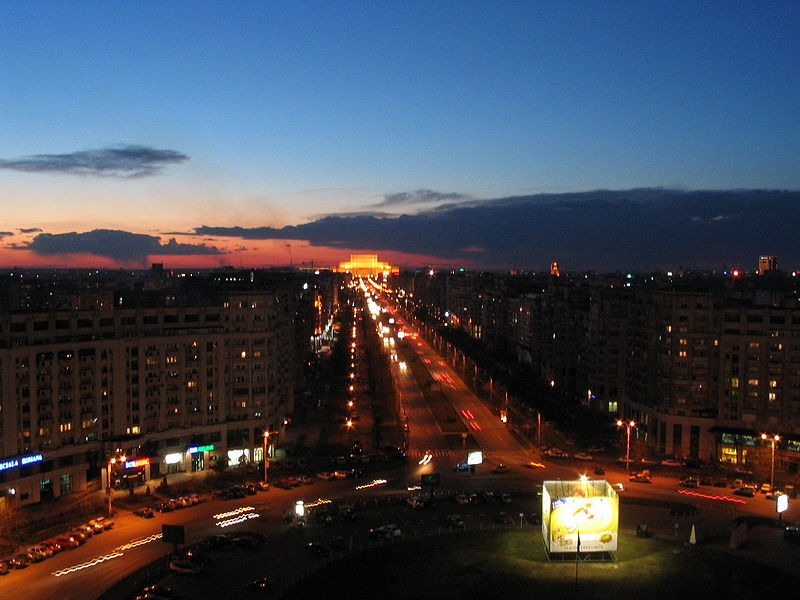
Looking west from Piața Alba Iulia at dusk

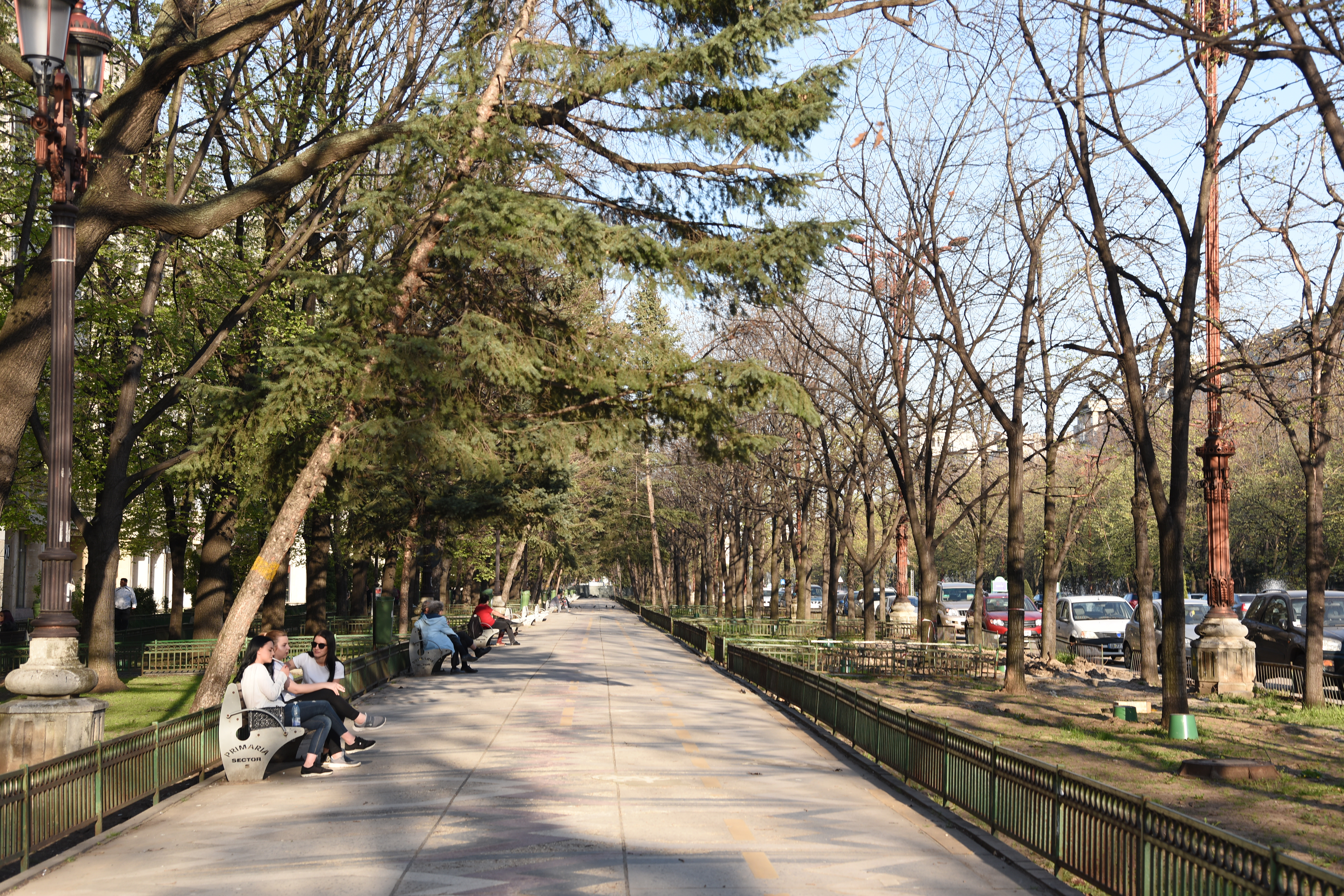
View of the boulevard

== See also ==
- Systematization
- Ceaușima
