= Unirea Shopping Center =

Coordinates: 44°25′40.78″N 26°6′16.15″E

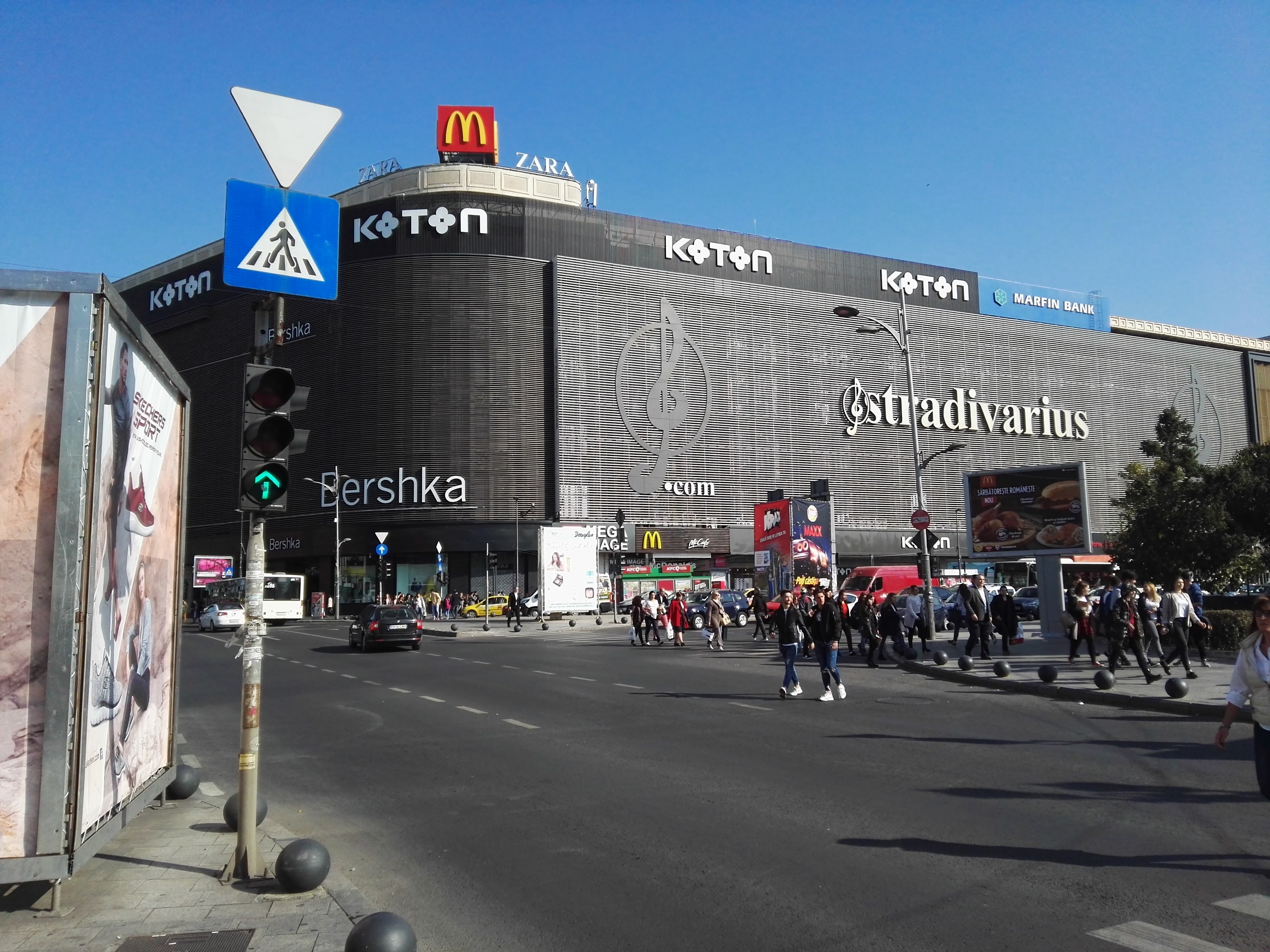
- Location: Bucharest, Romania
- Opened: 2 September 1976
- Owner: S.C. Unirea Shopping Center S.A.
- Num. of stores: 250
- Floor area: 43,760 m^{2} (471,000 sq ft)
- Floors: 4
- Parking: 1,000 underground & deck

Unirea Shopping Center is a chain of two large shopping centres, the initial one being located in Unirii Square, Bucharest, Romania, and the second one in Brașov.

== Bucharest ==
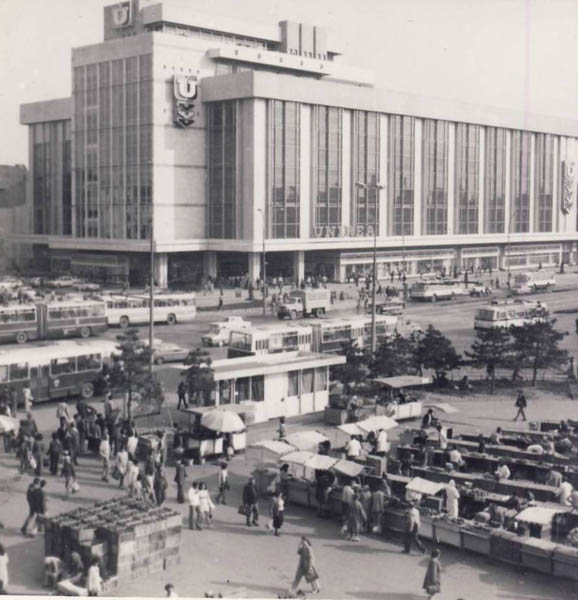
Unirea Shopping Center during the communist period

Opened in 1976 and enlarged in 1989, it was the largest department store in Communist Romania. It was converted into a shopping centre during the 1990s. The complex has a total area of 83,971 square metres (903,856 sq ft) and 1,000 parking spaces. The closest metro station to the shopping centre is Piața Unirii metro station.

=== Critical reception ===
In recent years, several retail spaces have become vacant at Unirea Shopping Center in Bucharest, where numerous well-known and lesser-known brands previously operated. The building's condition has also deteriorated. Redevelopment proposals could include reducing the retail floor area, modernising the premises, and creating office space on the upper floors. In 2020, some specialised clothing stores continued to attract customers from across the Bucharest region.

=== Developments in the 2020s ===
In January 2021 two outlets of the Inditex group (Bershka and Pull&Bear) were closed as a result of the COVID-19 pandemic, leaving the once attractive façade of the building partially crippled and shop windows at the north side of the building empty and less attractive. The food court on the top fourth floor was also closed, and most of the remaining shops on the third floor (with one exception) were closed as well, or were relocated to empty space on the second floor. In the basement, a Mega Image grocery store operated until its closure in early 2023. On the third and second floor many of the fire exits have been permanently locked, which constitutes a serious health risk in case of a fire in the building.

== Unirea Shopping Center Brașov ==
The owner opened a second shopping centre in 2008 in Brașov, Unirea Shopping Center Brașov, covering 42,000 square metres (452,084 sq ft) on four levels and one underground, with ground and underground parking on three levels. 90% of the brands are present in the Bucharest complex too. Total value of the investment is estimated at 35 million euro.

In 2019 the Brașov shopping center, once very favorite for its location near to the railway station, seems to have lost the battle with recently developed malls elsewhere in the city, since it is almost empty, as if in a state waiting for permanent closure.
