= Dealul Spirii =

Historic hill in Bucharest, Romania

Coordinates: 44°25′38.79″N 26°5′18.91″E

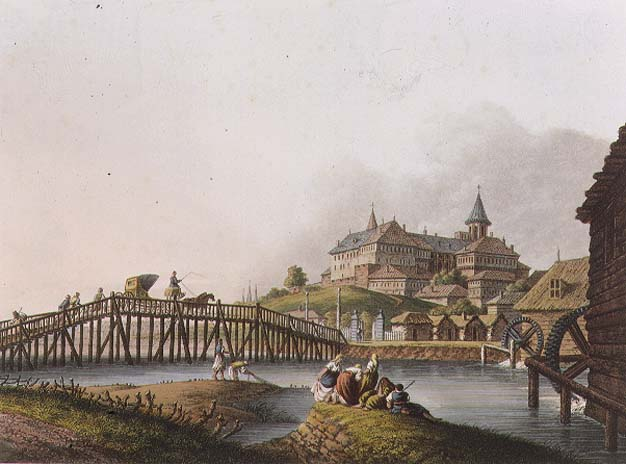
The Dâmbovița watermills on the outskirts of Bucharest, with Dealul Spirii and Mihai Vodă Monastery in the background, 1837.

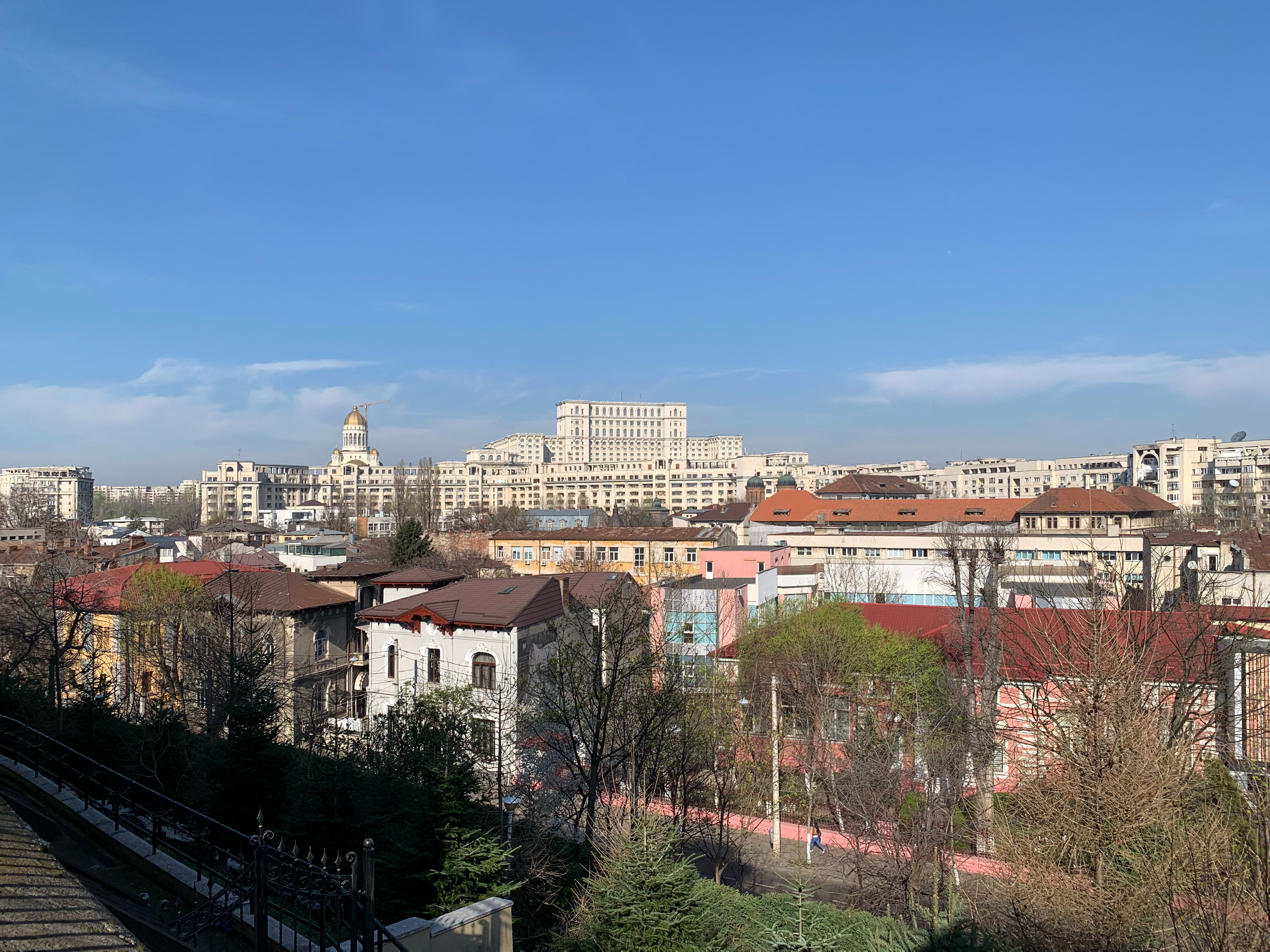
The Palace of the Parliament and the People's Salvation Cathedral (left) on Dealul Spirii. Taken looking westward from Metropolitanate Hill, 2023.

Dealul Spirii (Romanian: [ˈde̯alul ˈspirij], 'Spirea's Hill') is a hill in Bucharest, Romania. It is the location of the Palace of the Parliament – initially built by Nicolae Ceaușescu as the House of the People – and the National Cathedral of Romania, also the People's Salvation Cathedral, the largest Eastern Orthodox church in the world.

== Alternative names ==
The height was also known as Dealul Arsenalului ('Arsenal Hill') and Dealul Uranus ('Uranus Hill'), after the armoury established there and the quarter built around the hill, respectively.

== History ==
Initially a vineyard known as Dealul Lupeștilor ('Hill of the Lupescu family'), it was renamed after a certain doctor Spiridon "Spirea" Kristofi, who founded the fortified Spirea Veche church in 1765. The church was demolished in 1984 to make place for the People's House.

Also on the hill were found the ruins of Curtea Nouă ('the New Court'), the princely residence built in 1776 by Alexander Ypsilantis, Prince of Wallachia, to replace Curtea Veche ('the Old Court'). It was built together with a large wine cellar, still in use during the 1900s. Curtea Nouă was the official residence of the Phanariotes (members of upper-class Greek families from Constantinople's Phanári quarter, chosen by the Sublime Porte as rulers of Wallachia and Moldavia) until 1812, when it burnt down; it was since known as Curtea Arsă ('the Burnt Court'), with the ruins being razed completely in 1986.

In July 1818, Dealul Spirii was the site of a hot air balloon flight, an event witnessed by Prince John Caradja.

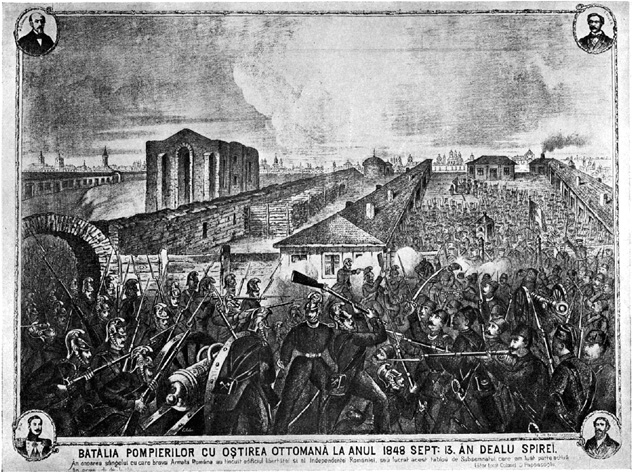
Lithograph of the battle between the Bucharest firemen and Ottoman troops, 1848

On 13 September 1848, the closing battle of the 1848 Wallachian Revolution was fought on the hill, involving the Ottoman troops sent to quell the rebellion, and some infantry troops along with the fire brigade of Bucharest, led by Pavel Zăgănescu.

In 1861, the Bucharest Army Arsenal was established on the hill. which led to its alternate name, Dealul Arsenalului.

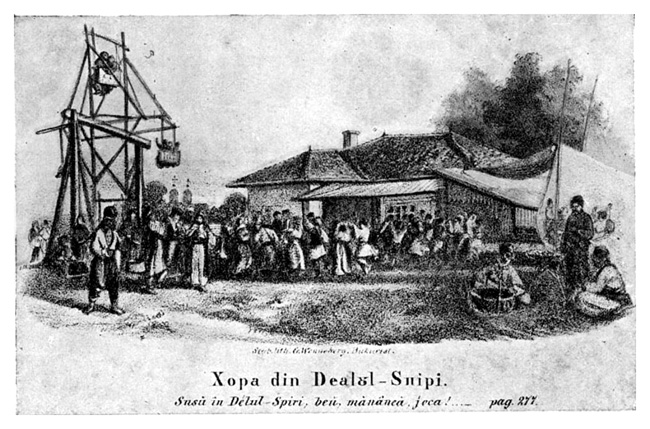
Dancing the hora on Spirii Hill (1857 lithograph)

After World War I, the hill gave its name to the famous Dealul Spirii Trial, which involved members of the Romanian Communist Party, after a bomb was detonated on 8 December 1920 in the Romanian Senate (situated on the hill), which was detonated by Max Goldstein, a communist sympathizer.

Also located on this hill was Stadionul Republicii, an Art deco stadium inaugurated in 1928 as the ANEF Stadium (the stadium of the National Academy of Physical Education) and used by the Progresul football team, now known as FC Național. The stadium was covered up during the construction of the People's House. The remnants of the stadium were converted in 2006 into an underground parking lot.

The quarter located around the hill was named after its main thoroughfare, Uranus, which ran up the hill from Calea Rahovei to the Stadium, and thence to Splaiul Independenței ('Independence Quay') and Izvor. Uranus was one of the historic districts completely destroyed by Ceaușescu's communist regime, in order to build the People's House (see Ceaușima), part of the larger project involving Bucharest's new Civic Centre.

Dealul Spirii has been the site of many historic buildings, including a number of churches and synagogues. When the hill was razed, a mass grave was also discovered, containing the remains of people killed by the Black Death.
