= Nuns' Skete =

Heritage site in Bucharest, Romania

Coordinates: 44°25′30″N 26°05′31″E

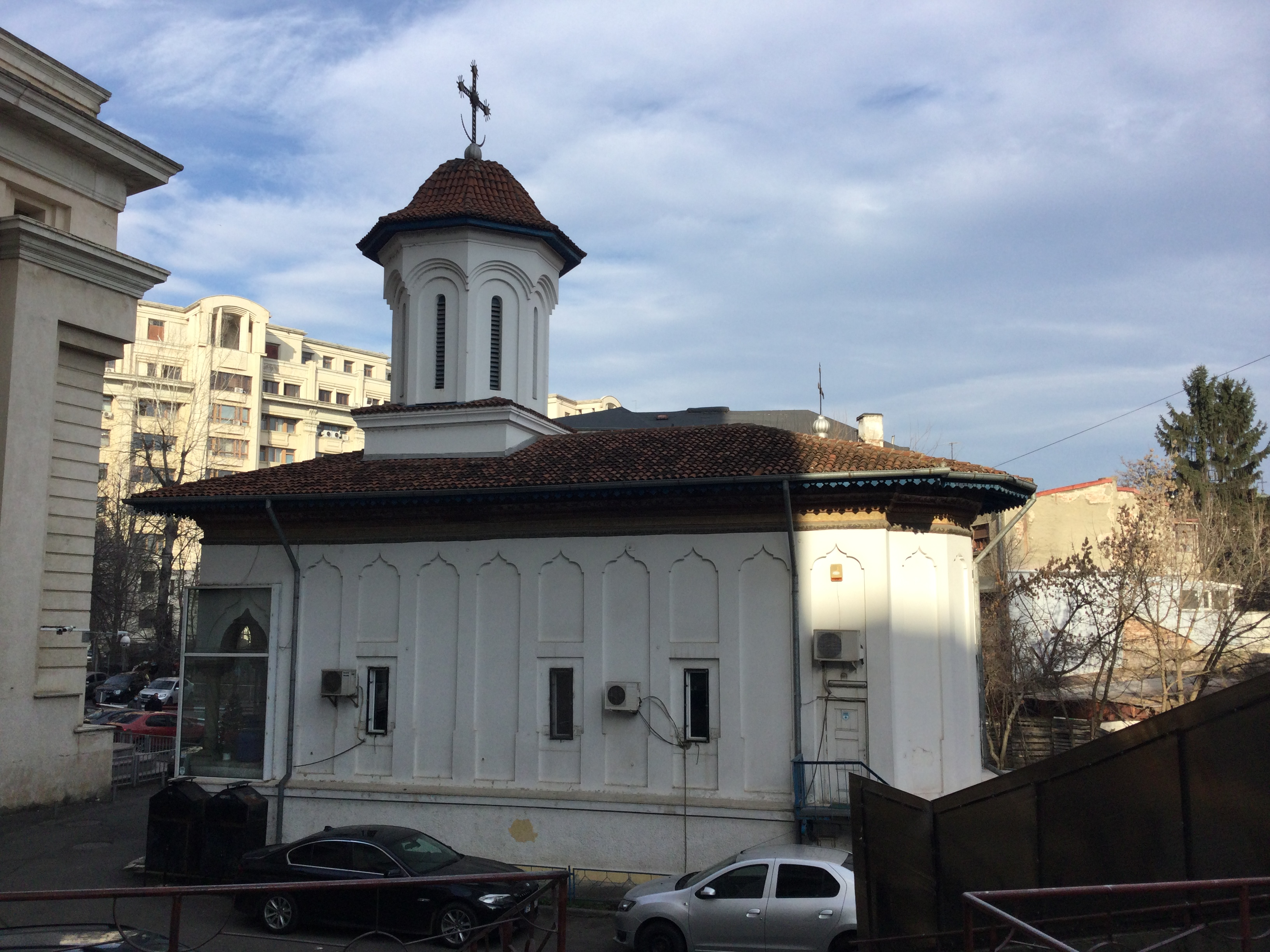
Nuns' Skete

The Nuns' Skete (Romanian: Schitul Maicilor) is a Romanian Orthodox church and former skete located at 47 Mitropolit Antim Ivireanul Street in Bucharest, Romania. It is dedicated to the Feast of the Annunciation.

The church was built in the summer and autumn of 1726, with Tatiana Hagi Dinu as ktetoressa; she later became a nun. Upon its founding, Lady Smaranda, the wife of Prince Nicholas Mavrocordatos, donated land from the princely estate. During construction, Pashali, high captain of Seymens, served as Ispravnic. The skete became a metochion of Țigănești Monastery in Ciolpani, and in 1730, Hagi Dina dedicated it to the Metropolis. Gradually, the monastery was granted properties, and received relic fragments of Saints Nicholas and Charalambos, still preserved in the altar table legs. In 1865, after the secularization of monastic estates, it came under the administration of the Albă Postăvari Church. It was returned to the Țigănești Monastery in 1926 and became a chapel of the Patriarchate in 1952.

The church underwent repairs in 1896: the columns separating narthex from nave were removed, and the original frescoes were painted over. It was consolidated after the 1940 earthquake. Through the personal care of Patriarch Justinian Marina, the ensemble was restored between 1955 and 1958. The surrounding buildings, partly used by the Biblical Institute, were redone in Neo-Brâncovenesc style, replicating elements from Comana and Horezu Monasteries, as well as from the portico of the church itself. Although modest in size, the ensemble of church, kitchen and other buildings formed a harmonious whole in terms of proportion and decor. The regime of Nicolae Ceaușescu ordered their demolition so as to make way for the Republic's House. The decree met with vehement opposition from the parish priest in 1980, but demolition proceeded in 1982. Only the church remained, the 745-ton structure being moved 245 meters eastward over a period of 72 hours. In its new location, it was isolated and soon surrounded by massive government buildings. After the move, the church operated for one more month, when the regime ordered its closure. Some repairs were carried out in secret. In 1995, several years after the Romanian Revolution, the painting was restored and further repairs carried out. Services resumed the following year.

The ship-shaped church measures 17.75 meters long by 6.8 meters high. It has a single dome, the bell tower, rising 15.5 meters above the narthex. The nave and narthex have spherical ceilings resting on pendentives, while their floor is paved with Rușchița marble. The open portico has three arches sustained by slender stone columns with spiral fluting, ornamented bases and capitals. The facades are decorated throughout, except on the lower portion, where windows in stone frames interrupt the ornamental flow. The foundation is around one meter high; the roof is covered in tiles. The entrance portal is surrounded by a frame of carved stone. The church hosts an icon of the Virgin Mary, donated by the founder and ascribed by some with wonder-working abilities.

The church is listed as a historic monument by Romania's Ministry of Culture and Religious Affairs.
