= Piața Constituției =

Square in Bucharest, Romania

Coordinates: 44°25′38″N 26°05′30″E

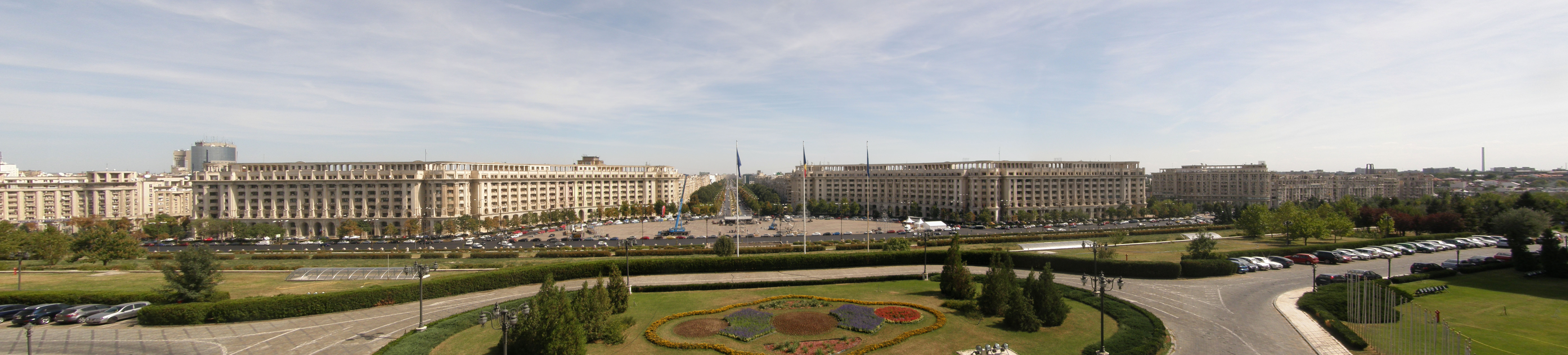
Piața Constituției, as seen from the balcony of the Palace of the Parliament

Piața Constituției (Romanian for "Constitution Square") is one of the largest squares in the centre of Bucharest, Romania. The square is standing face-to-face with the Palace of the Parliament (biggest building in Europe) and it is bisected by Bulevardul Unirii (Union Boulevard) and by Bulevardul Libertății (Liberty Boulevard).

The square is one of the best places to organize concerts and parades of Bucharest. Every year, the mayor of Bucharest organizes the New Year's Party in this square. The square is also used to host military parades in honor of the National Day of Romania.

== Concerts ==
Concerts in Constitution Square
Date	Artist	Tour	Attendance
6 September 2004	(United Kingdom) Sarah Brightman	Harem World Tour	20.000
16 May 2010	(Australia) AC/DC	Black Ice	55,000
5 June 2010	(United Kingdom) Elton John	European Tour	8,000
7 May 2011	(Colombia) Shakira	The Sun Comes Out	20,000
6 June 2011	(United Kingdom) Sting	Symphonicity	10,000
10 July 2011	(United States) Bon Jovi	Live	60,000
16 August 2012	(United States) Lady Gaga	Born This Way Ball	35,000
22 September 2012	(Canada) Leonard Cohen	Old Ideas	15,000
24 July 2013	(United Kingdom) Iron Maiden	Maiden England	15,000
28 August 2013	(United Kingdom) Roger Waters	The Wall	50,000
17 July 2015	(United Kingdom) Robbie Williams	Let Me Entertain You Tour	60,000
5 June 2015	(Netherlands) André Rieu	Live from Bucharest (7-concert marathon)	84,000
2 September 2015	(Argentina) Cast of Violetta	Violetta Live	N/A
5 June 2016	(United States) Maroon 5	Maroon V Tour	25,000
11 June 2016	(Netherlands) André Rieu		12,500
21 June 2016	(United Kingdom) / (United States) Queen/Adam Lambert	Summer Festival Tour	40,000
29 July 2016	(United Kingdom) Muse	Drones World Tour	17,000
30 July 2016	(United Kingdom) Iron Maiden	The Book of Souls World Tour	25,000
14 August 2016	(Barbados) Rihanna	ZUtopia Music Festival	52,000
15 August 2016	(United States) Steve Aoki	ZUtopia Music Festival	12,000
17 August 2016	(Australia) Sia	ZUtopia Music Festival	N/A
22 June 2017	(Italy) Andrea Bocelli		9,000
22 September 2018	(United Kingdom) Hurts		N/A
23 September 2018	(United Kingdom) Rod Stewart		N/A
21 July 2019	(United States) / (Romania) Bon Jovi/Firma	This House Is Not For Sale Tour	N/A
22 July 2019	(United Kingdom) Editors	Rock the City Festival	
22 July 2019	(Republic of Ireland) God Is An Astronaut	Rock the City Festival	
22 July 2019	(Poland) Coma	Rock the City Festival	
22 July 2019	(United Kingdom) The Cure	Rock the City Festival	
18 August 2023	(United Kingdom) Robbie Williams	Summer in the City Festival	
18 August 2023	(United Kingdom) Calum Scott	Summer in the City Festival	
18 August 2023	(United States) LP	Summer in the City Festival	
19 August 2023	(United States) Jason Derulo	Summer in the City Festival	
19 August 2023	(United States) Abby Robertson	Summer in the City Festival	
