= Piața Unirii =

Square in Bucharest, Romania

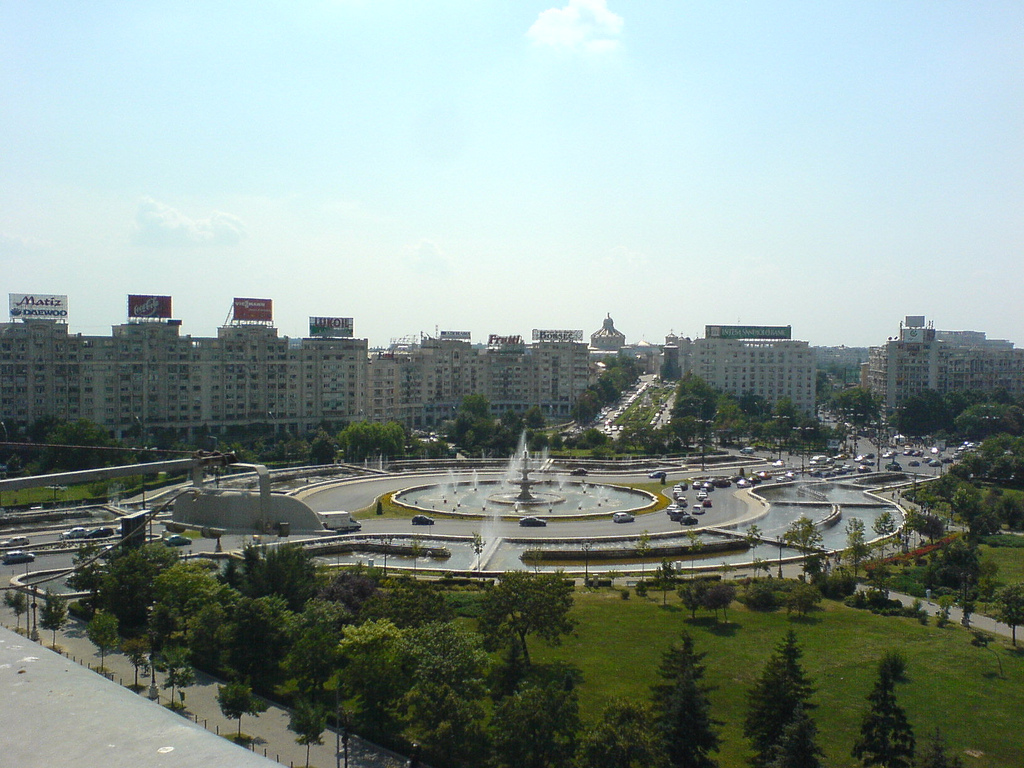
- View of the square in 2009
- Interactive map of Piața Unirii
- Former name: Piața Națiunii
- Location: Bucharest, Romania
- Coordinates: 44°25′39.324″N 26°06′8.772″E
- North: Strada Halelor
- South: Splaiul Independenței

Construction
- Completion: c. 1935

Piața Unirii (Romanian pronunciation: [ˈpjat͡sa uˈnirij], Union Square) is the largest square in central Bucharest, Romania, and one of the largest public spaces in Europe, being located immediately south of the old town and within the boundaries of Sector 3. Part of the Civic Centre, it is bisected by Unirii Boulevard, originally built during the Communist era as the Boulevard of the Victory of Socialism, and renamed after the Romanian Revolution of 1989.

== Overview ==
The square functions as part of an extended reinforced concrete bridge crossing the Dâmbovița River. The part of the square capping the river is called the Union Floor (Romanian: Planșeul Unirii), measuring 32 m (105.0 ft) wide by 360 m (1,181.1 ft) long, stretching diagonally through the square.

The Unirea Shopping Center and the Cocor department store are located on the east side of this square, while the historic Hanul lui Manuc is on the north side, near the northeast corner. The centre of the square boasts a park and the fountains which are particularly popular with commuters and passers-by in the torrid summer months, as it is the largest complex of fountains in Europe and one of the most impressive in the world, its spectacle becoming a huge tourist attraction after the reopening of the fountains in 2018, as part of the celebrations of the Centennial of the Great Union of 1918. There were plans since the interwar period to build the Romanian National Salvation Cathedral on the place of this park, but in the early 2000s the idea proved technically impossible due to the busy underground environment and therefore the location was changed.

== History ==
Construction of the square began in December 1934 and was inaugurated on October 15, 1935, as Nation Square (Romanian: Piața Națiunii) as the start of a plan by mayor Dem I. Dobrescu (and continued by Alexandru Gh. Donescu) to cover the whole of the Dâmbovița through Bucharest, which city officials had seen as a nuisance because of its pollution and flood risk. The square incorporates the older stone and masonry arched bridges of the Coșbuc bridge and the Șerban Vodă bridge.

In 2023, an analysis carried out by civil engineers revealed severe degradation to the cover of the Dâmbovița River at Piața Unirii. The cover, which was part of a larger, unrealized project between 1938 and 1941, was found to be in a state of advanced degradation, with exposed rebar and crumbling concrete. Following the discovery, traffic of over 3.5 tonnes was banned from traveling through the square. On May 27, 2024, mayor Nicușor Dan approved a construction permit for the reconstruction of the square.

== Transportation ==
The square is a significant transportation hub, containing the Piața Unirii metro station and a major interchange for STB buses; there is also a tram terminal near the southwest corner and a large taxi stand.

== See also ==
- Centrul Civic

== Gallery ==
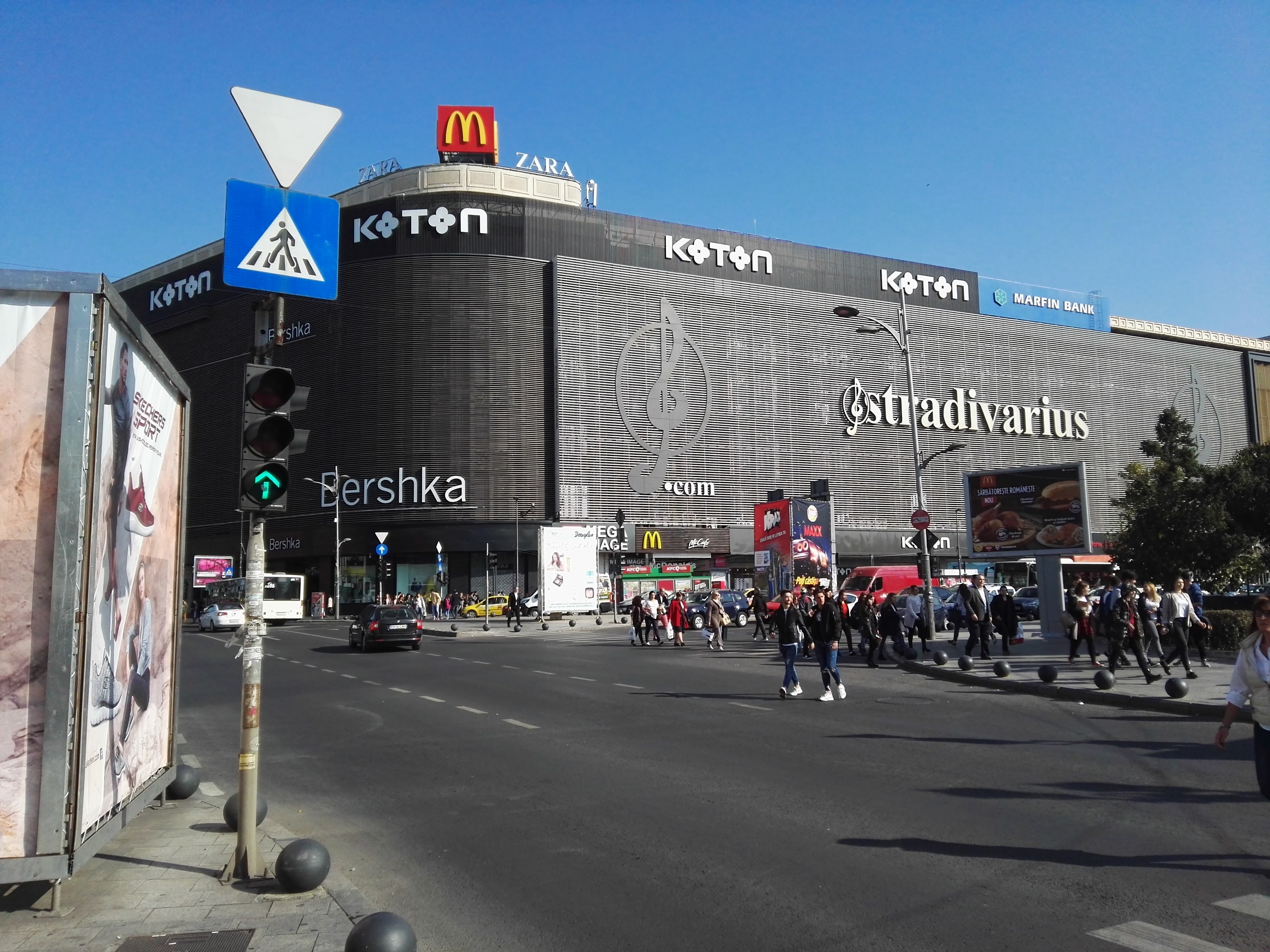
Unirea Shopping Center

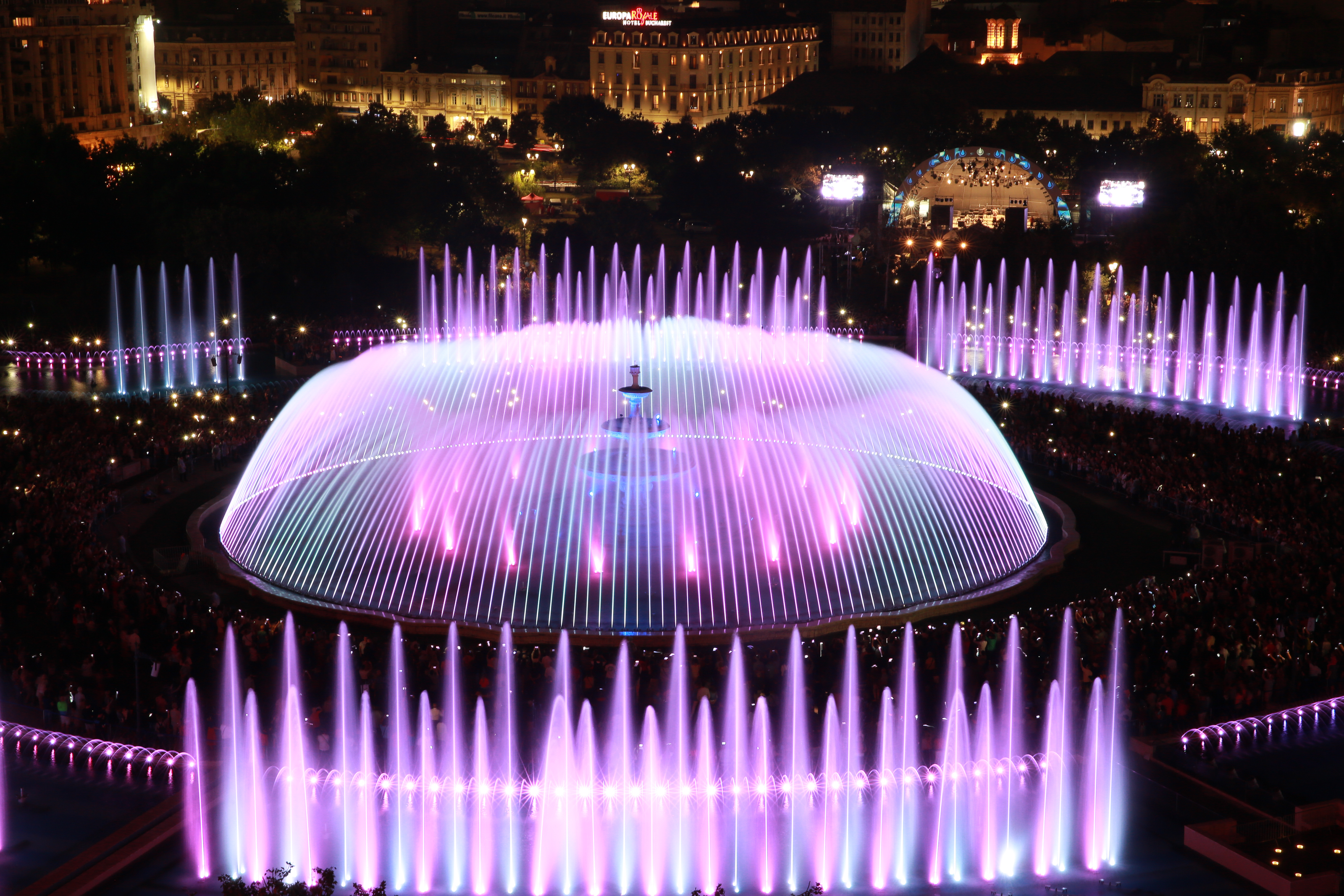
Fountains in the center of Unirii Square

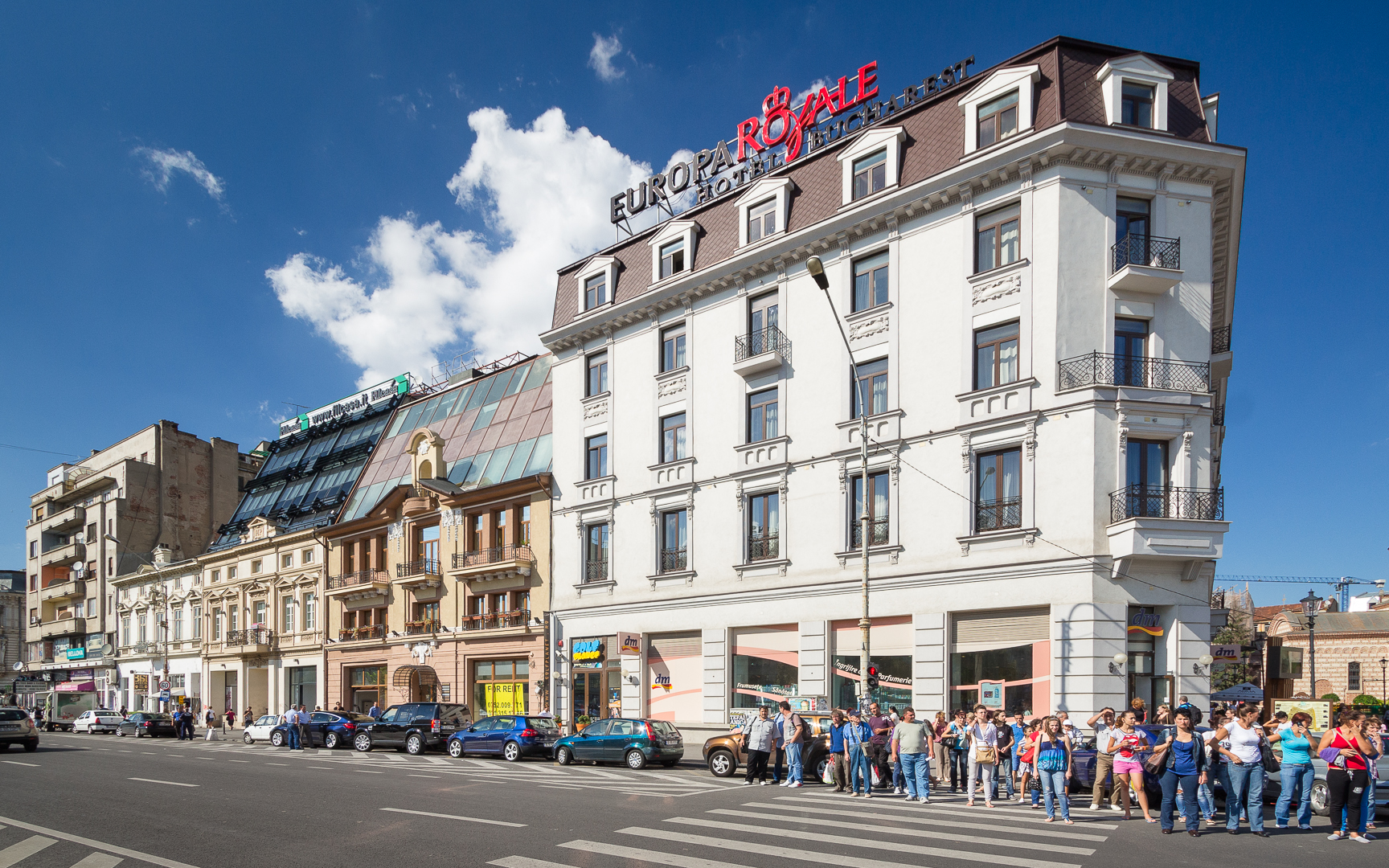
Splaiul Independenței

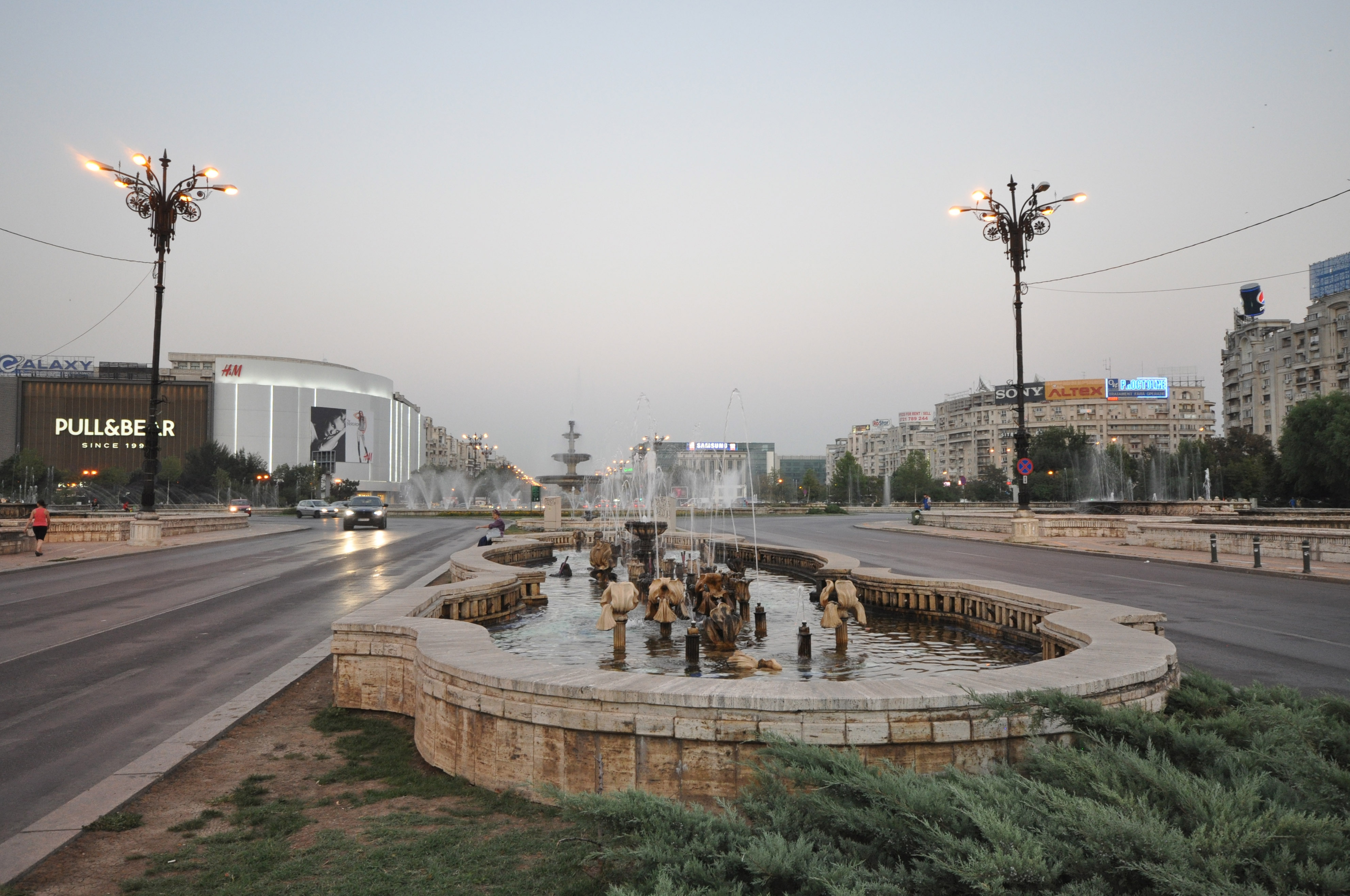
Bulevardul Unirii passing through Piața Unirii

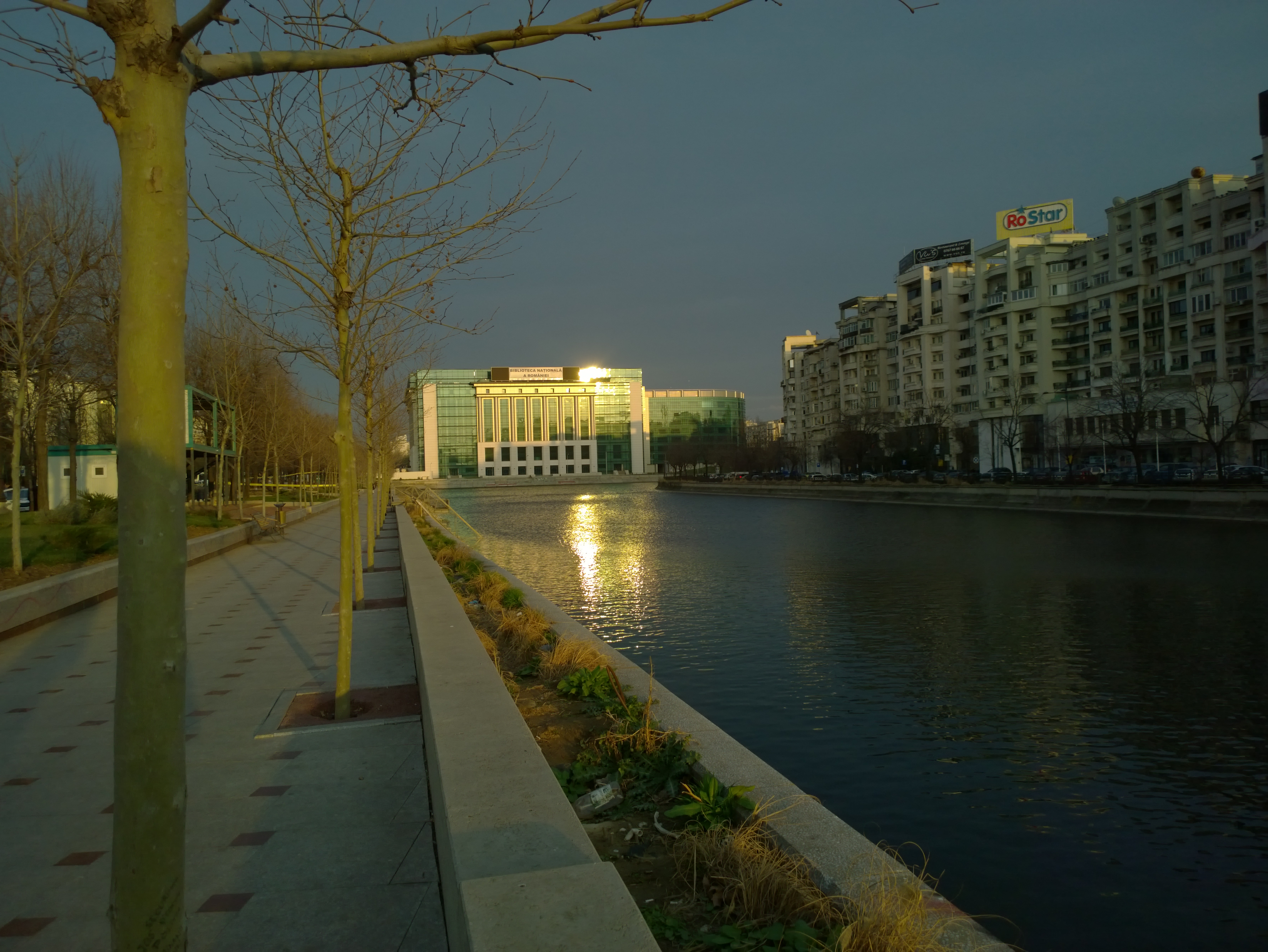
National Library and the Dâmbovița River as seen from Piața Unirii
