= Ceaușescu family =

Family of Nicolae Ceaușescu

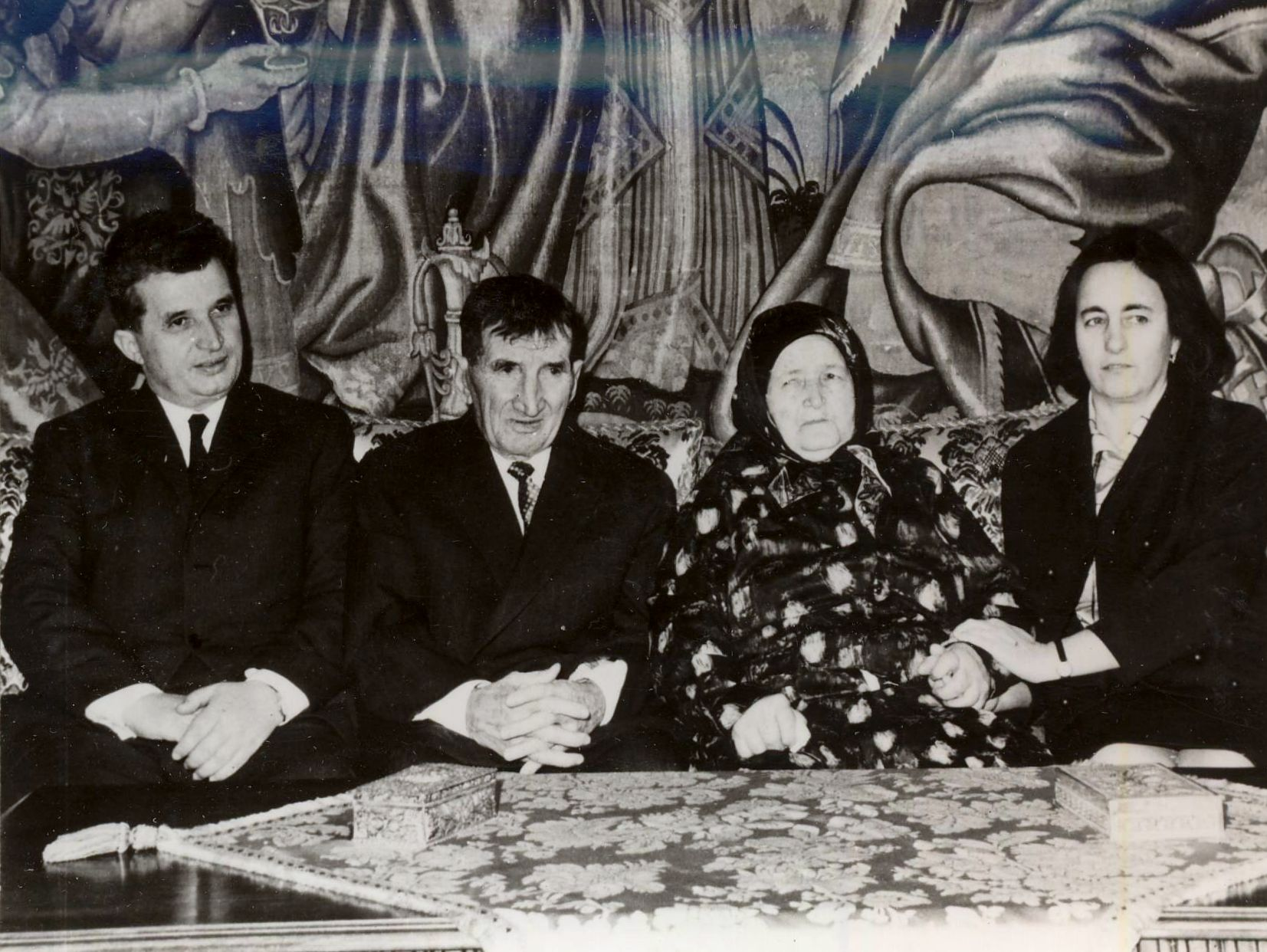
Nicolae Ceaușescu (left), his parents (center) and his wife Elena (right), in 1968

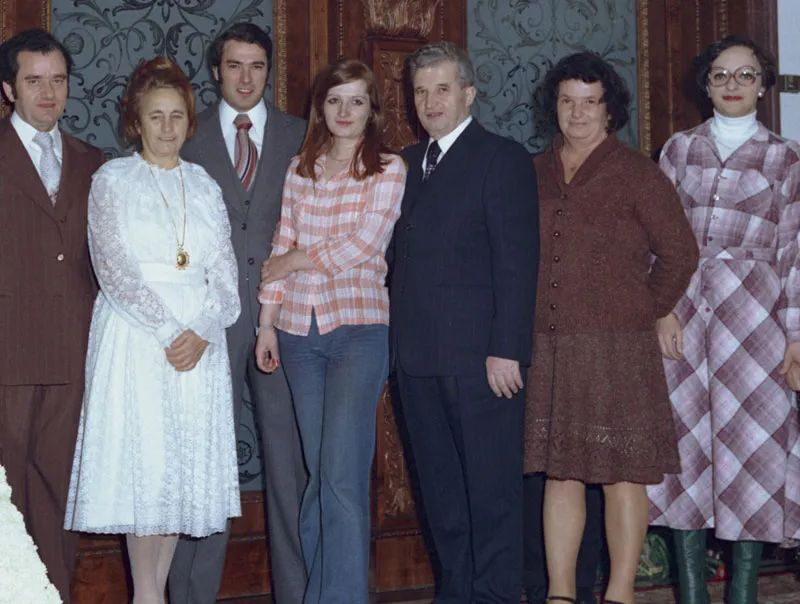
Ceaușescu family in the early 1980s; left to right: Elena's brother Gheorghe, Elena, Nicu, Zoia, Nicolae, and Nicolae's sister Niculina

Nicolae Ceaușescu, who led Romania from 1965 to 1989, served as General Secretary of the Romanian Communist Party. Ceaușescu had a large family, several members of which wielded influence in Communist Romania. Below are given outlines of his immediate family members' lives, with links to those who have separate articles about them.

Nicolae's father was Andruță Ceaușescu (1886–1969), the descendant of a family of shepherds from Polovragi, in Gorj County. Andruță owned a modest house in Scornicești, Olt County. A supporter of Ion Mihalache and the Peasants' Party, he was for a while mayor of Scornicești. After the fall and execution of Nicolae, some people from Scornicești claimed Andruță used to beat his wife and children, while the Romanian media alleged that he was an alcoholic.

Nicolae's mother was Alexandrina (née Lixandra Militaru; 1888–1977), descendant of an officer in Tudor Vladimirescu's army. She was a very religious woman, and after his parents died, Nicolae Ceaușescu, an atheist, ordered that a church be built in their memory in Scornicești; their portraits still adorn its walls.

In order of birth, their children were:

- Niculina Ceaușescu (1914–1991). She was the first in her family to leave for Bucharest, seeking work. There, she kept Nicolae in her home in 1929 when he started work as a shoemaker's apprentice.
- Marin Ceaușescu (1916–1989) had two daughters, Mihaela and Gabriela.
- Nicolae Ceaușescu (1918–1989). In 1946, he married Elena Petrescu. They had three children:
  - Valentin Ceaușescu (born 1948; one son, Daniel, and one daughter, Alexandra).
  - Zoia Ceaușescu (1949–2006).
  - Nicu Ceaușescu (1951–1996).
- Maria Ceaușescu (1920–2008), later Maria Agachi, worked at Electromagnetica, eventually becoming section chief at that factory due to her family connections. She had two daughters, Niculina and Angela; the first one died in the 1977 Vrancea earthquake.
- Florea Ceaușescu (2 August 1922 – 21 October 2006). He was reportedly an Iron Guard sympathizer as a young man, although this cannot be confirmed, as his Romanian Communist Party cadre file is missing from the National Archives. He married Scornicești native Ioana Necă in 1946, and according to his brother Ilie, worked in Bucharest as a waiter in 1946 and as a merchant in 1949. That year, he joined the party and began working for its Bucharest newspaper, Steagul Roșu, later joining Scînteia. Of his relatives, he got on best with Marin, and he closely resembled Nicolae, with whom he was sometimes confused.
- Nicolae Andruță Ceaușescu (1924–1999). Supposedly, his drunken father declared his name as Nicolae at town hall, despite having another son by that name. Once his brother came to power, his father's name was made his middle name in order to distinguish the two. At one time, he was chief of cadres at the Ministry of the Interior. Due to a disagreement with his brother, he was later sent to head the Securitate officers' school in Băneasa. He was arrested during the Romanian Revolution by Aurel Ceciu, one of the people he had promoted from that school. Nicolae Andruță Ceaușescu had two children, Cristian and Claudia.
- Ilie Ceaușescu (1926–2003) had a daughter, Veronica, and a son, Dan.
- Elena Ceaușescu (later Bărbulescu; 1928–2001) was a history teacher at Scornicești High School. Due to her famous brother, she rapidly advanced in her career, quickly becoming head of her school and then school inspector for the whole of Olt County. She had two daughters, Eugenia and Nadia, and a son, Emil, who held a leadership position at the Ministry of the Interior in Olt County before 1989.
- Costel Ceaușescu (1930–1931), the only family member who did not survive to adulthood.
- Ion Ceaușescu (1932–2019) taught at the Agronomic Institute of Bucharest and headed the Academy of Agricultural Sciences. After the Revolution of 1989, he established a firm and wrote horticultural works. He had a son, Nicolae, and a daughter, Ileana.

Nicolae's parents had 18 grandchildren: 7 boys and 11 girls.
