= Romanian systematization programme =

Social engineering programme

Systematization (Romanian: Sistematizarea) was a programme of urban planning and social engineering in the Socialist Republic of Romania from 1974 to 1989. The legal framework for this programme was established as early as 1974, but it only began in earnest in March 1988, after the Romanian authorities renounced most favoured nation status and the American human rights scrutiny which came with it. The declared aim of this programme was to eliminate the differences between urban and rural, by razing half of Romania's 13,000 villages and moving their residents into hundreds of new "agro-industrial centres" by 2000. It was carried out by the Romanian Communist Party under the leadership of Nicolae Ceaușescu, impressed by the ideological mobilization of North Korea under its Juche ideology, with the stated goal of turning Romania into a "multilaterally developed socialist society". It consisted largely of the demolition and reconstruction of existing settlements, in whole or in part, in order to urbanize and modernize the country. Systematization was controversial for the mass demolition of historic centers which became known as Ceaușima. Within a year, on 18 April 1989, the first batch of 23 new agro-industrial towns had been completed. Although cut short by the Romanian Revolution in December 1989, at least three more rural settlements in an advanced state of systematization were ultimately transformed into towns.

== Background ==
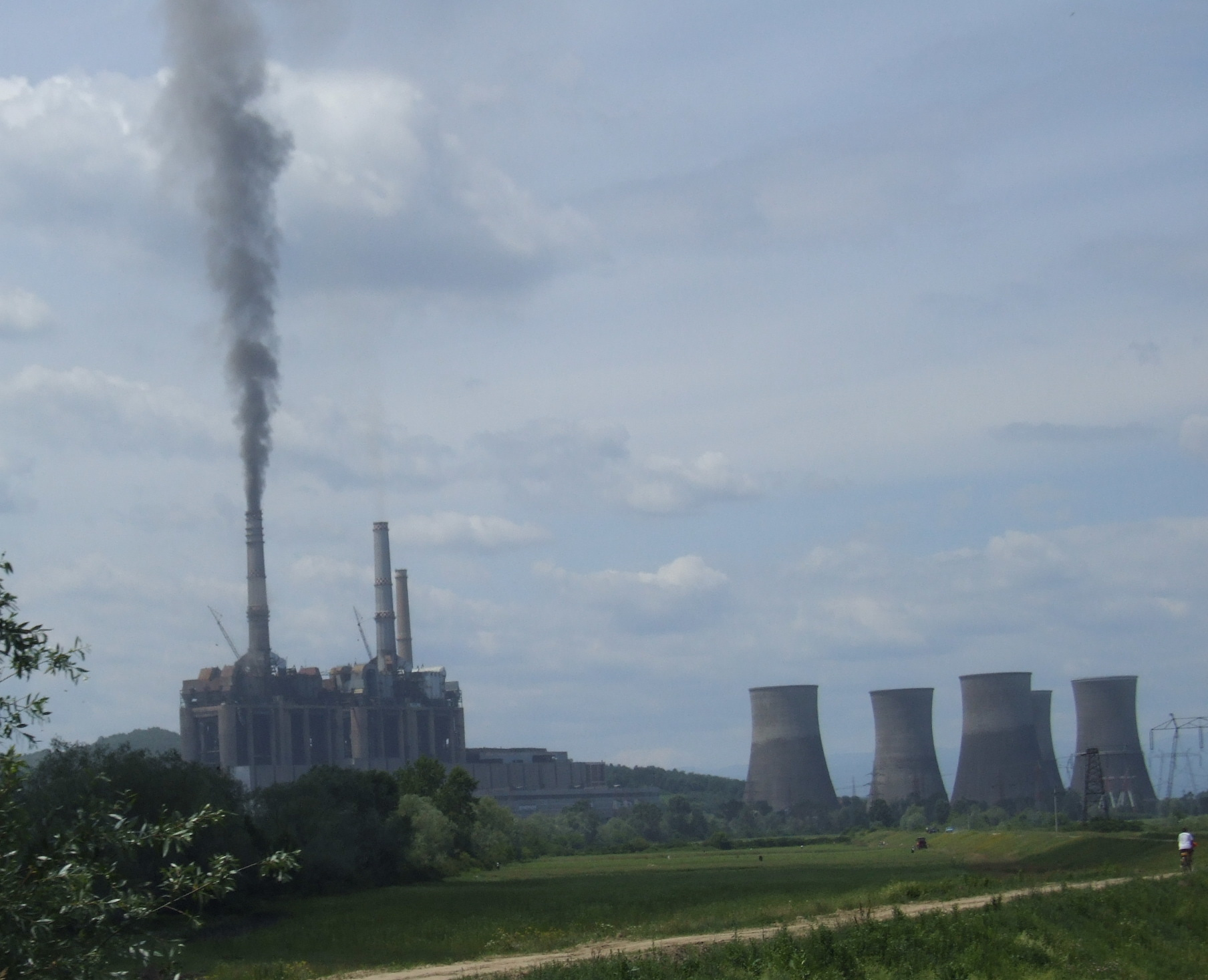
Rovinari – the only town created under the Systematization Law before the batch of 23 in 1989

Nicolae Ceaușescu's 1988 idea to raze about half of Romania's 13,000 villages and rebuild others into "agro-industrial centers" was not new. It had been written into law in 1974. At that time, about 3,000 villages were scheduled to die out gradually, while 300–400 more were to be transformed into towns. However, industrial construction assumed priority, overshadowing the rural reconstruction and resettlement programme, which was not pursued with any vigour. In the spring of 1988, however, the rural systematization programme reemerged as a top priority on Ceaușescu's agenda. The concept was first developed by Nikita Khrushchev, aiming to raise the standard of rural life by amalgamating villages in order to stop the migration of younger people from rural to urban. However, the project was forgotten while Ceaușescu focused on other projects, such as the Centrul Civic and the Danube–Black Sea Canal, but it was relaunched in March 1988. The 1974 law for urban and rural territorial reorganization provided for the development of the countryside by focusing on the more viable villages while the rest would be gradually starved of investment. However, momentum was lost in the late 1970s, and of the 140 new towns promised by 1985, only one – Rovinari – was completed in 1981. No explanation was ever given, but likely Ceaușescu transferred his attention to the aforementioned projects.

=== Details of the plan ===
The villages most likely to be phased out were those with minimal prospects for growth. By the year 2000, 85% of communes were to have piped drinking water and 82% modern sewage. According to a statement by the regime, by the year 2000, Romania expected "to eradicate basic differences between villages and cities and to ensure the harmonious development of all sections of the country". Ceauşescu's declared aim - based on an original idea in the Communist Manifesto - was "to wipe out radically the major differences between towns and villages; to bring the living and working conditions of the working people in the countryside closer to those in the towns". He thought that by gathering people together into apartment buildings so that "the community fully dominates and controls the individual", systematization would produce Romania's "new socialist man". Ceaușescu was determined to revolutionize agriculture by increasing the cultivation area, while also stifling individual initiative and increasing centralization. The peasants were to receive derisory compensation for their demolished homes and then be charged rent for their new blocks, in which there was no accommodation for animals.

Romanian historian Dinu Giurescu commented, "The ultimate goal is the proletarianization of our society. The final step in this process is the loss of the individual house.". The US Congress claimed it was an all-out effort at social engineering: kitchens and bathrooms were supposedly meant to be communal space in the government-owned and controlled apartments. The number of villages was to be reduced to 5,000–6,000 (grouped in 2,000 communes), implying that 7,000–8,000 would be destroyed. Workers and intellectuals were to be settled in three- to four-storey buildings, with small blocks of four apartments or individual two-storey houses for the farmers. The countryside would be urbanized through 558 new agro-industrial towns. Although aspects of the programme were absolutely necessary (improvement of services, diversification and stabilization of the workforce), it allowed little scope for local consultation and its implementation timespan was far too short (hence compulsory resettlement) with no realistic compensation for the required expropriation.

=== The last stop: MFN status ===
Between 3 August 1975 and 3 July 1988, Romania was accorded most favoured nation status from the United States. In 1988, Ceaușescu renounced Romania's MFN status with the United States, just as the latter was about to suspend it over human rights violations. In July 1987, the United States Congress voted to suspend Romania's MFN status. Although the suspension was meant to last at least 6 months, in order to avoid further humiliation, Ceaușescu renounced his country's MFN status. More than 85 oral testimonies and 995 written statements were submitted to support the suspension of Romania's MFN status. On 26 February 1988, in order to save face, Romania announced that it did not need MFN status. The House and Senate votes were rejected as unacceptable "interference in the internal affairs" of Romania. To underline this rejection, the village-bulldozing program was made public in April 1988. Romania's renunciation of MFN status in February 1988 resulted from Ceaușescu's growing irritation with American pressure over Romania's human rights situation, such as Ceaușescu's treatment of his opponents. Ceaușescu's renunciation of MFN made its suspension by the United States Congress meaningless. His action showed that he would not submit to pressure from either side, East or West.

== Implementation and results ==
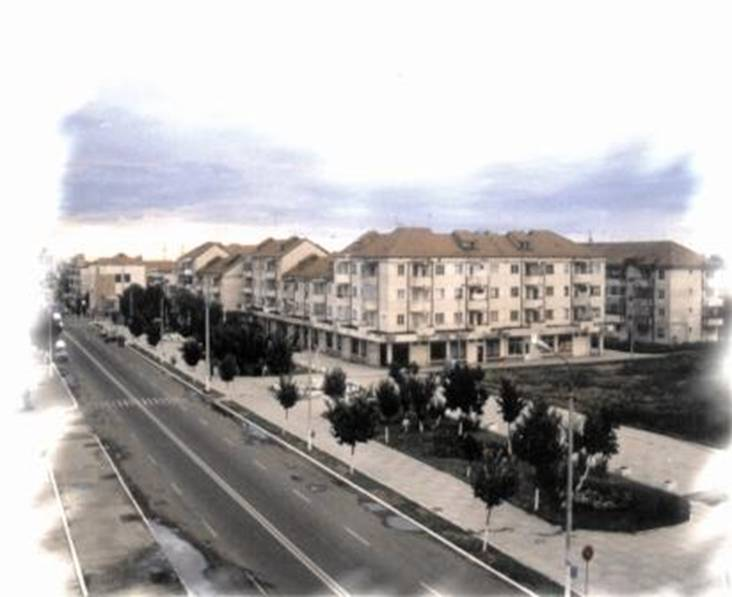
Ianca (shown in a postcard) became a town in 1989, as a result of the programme. A model for a small town in geographically flat plain areas.

Romania had traditionally been a largely rural country, with the vast majority of the population living in villages when the Romanian Communist Party (PCR) came to power after World War II. By the early ‘60s, the rural population still amounted for two-thirds of the population.

Ceaușescu felt fed-up by continuous United States Congressional scrutiny of Romania's human rights record, a scrutiny hindering his long-cherished "grand design". Shortly after his gesture on MFN, Ceaușescu announced the most sweeping and ominous plan of his regime, involving the liquidation of up to 8,000 villages. On 3 March 1988, speaking at an official conference, Ceaușescu announced that by the year 2000, 7,000 - 8,000 of Romania's 13,123 villages would be "modernized", as in transformed into 558 "agro-industrial" centres. The Ilfov Agricultural Sector around Bucharest was chosen by Ceaușescu as a showpiece (to be completed by 1992-1993), as a model for emulation by the rest of the country. The first evictions and demolitions took place in August 1988. Only two to three days were given before shops were closed down and bus services were stopped, forcing the inhabitants into the selected villages. Whole communities were moved to blocks in Otopeni and Ghermănești, where as many as ten families had to share one kitchen and the sewage system had not been completed. In other villages, "ugly" concrete civic centre buildings began to emerge in the planned new towns. Around eighteen villages had suffered major demolitions by the end of 1989, while five others were completely razed. According to the Wall Street Journal: "In the countryside, smashed hamlets and villages are making way for the same prefabricated housing blocks of Orwellian Bucharest." The systematization programme encountered resistance from both villagers and local authorities. The US Congress claimed local revolts against systematization had taken place in the villages of Petrova, Monor and Parva. Local officials were supposedly threatened, while in other places officials allegedly refused to carry out their orders. The director of the Miercurea Ciuc County Savings Bank supposedly resigned in protest over pressure to designate his native village of Păuleni-Ciuc as a street of the nearby town of Frumoasa.

In theory, the systematization plan extended to the entire country, though initial work centred on the northeastern region of Moldavia. It also affected such places as Ceaușescu's own native village of Scornicești in Olt County, where the Ceaușescu family home was the only older building left standing. The initial phase of systematization had largely petered out by 1980, at which point only about 10% of new housing was being built in rural areas. Given the lack of budget, in many regions systematization did not constitute an effective plan for development. Instead, it sometimes constituted a barrier against organic regional growth. For example, new buildings had to be at least two storeys high, meaning that low-income peasants could not afford to build houses themselves. Gardens were restricted to 250 square metres (2,700 square feet) and private agricultural plots were banned within the villages. Despite the perceived impact of such a scheme on subsistence agriculture, after 1981 villages were required to be agriculturally self-sufficient.

In the 1980s, nearby villages surrounding Bucharest were demolished, often in service of large scale projects such as the Danube–Bucharest Canal – projects which were later abandoned by Romania's post-communist government. The systematization programme was terminated on 26 December 1989, the day after the trial and execution of Nicolae and Elena Ceaușescu.

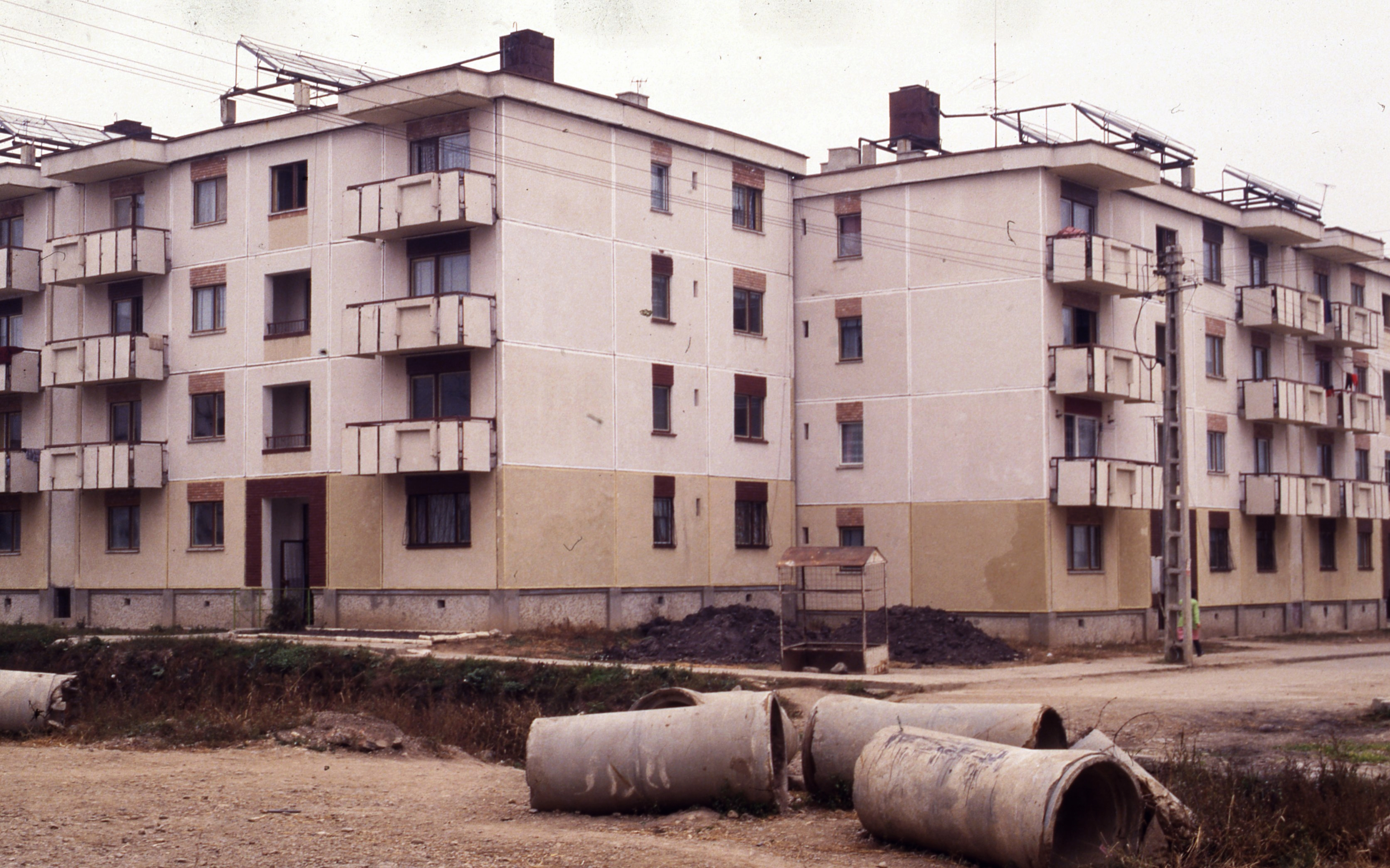
A typical village panel block in 1988

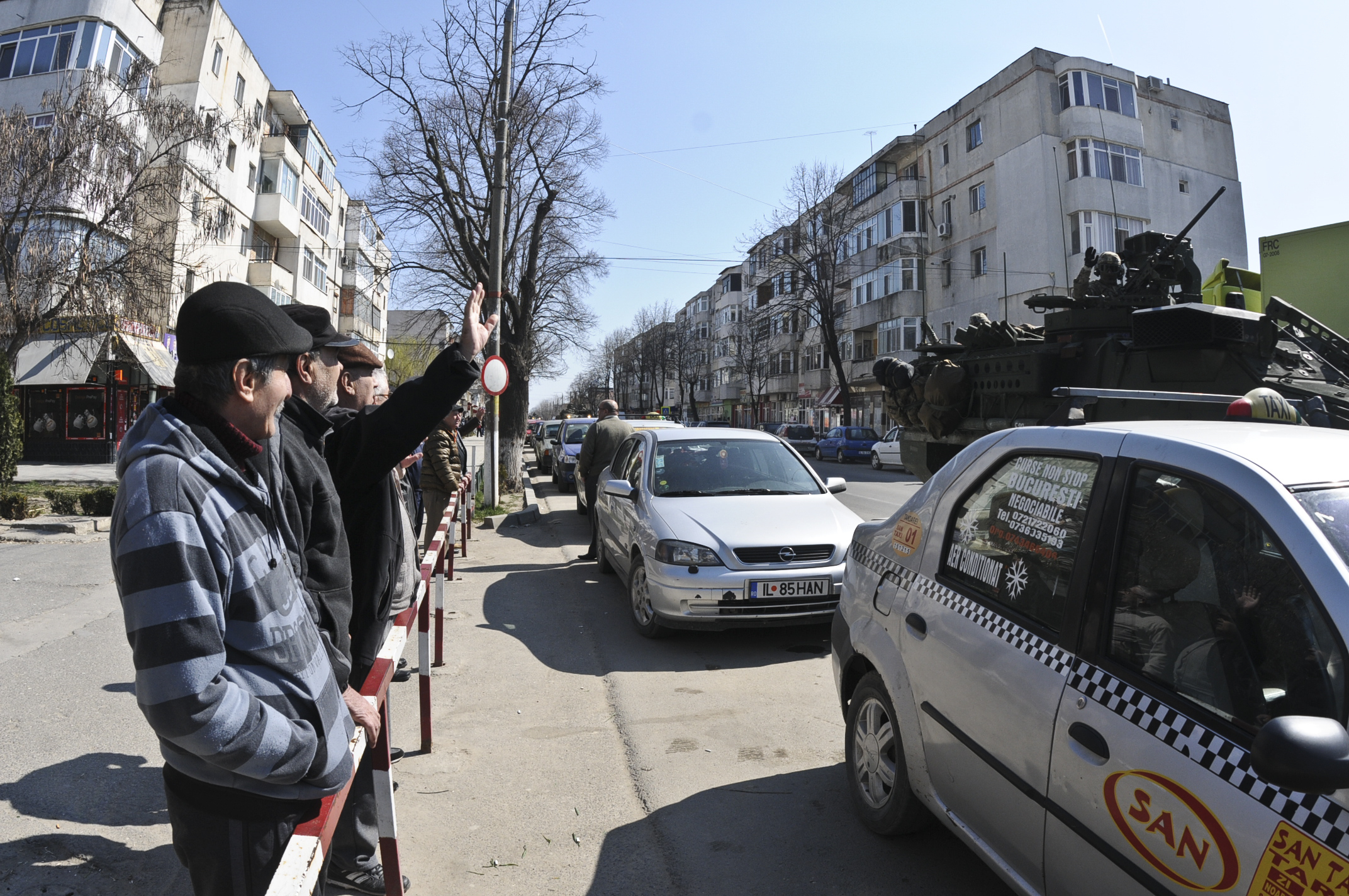
Însurăței

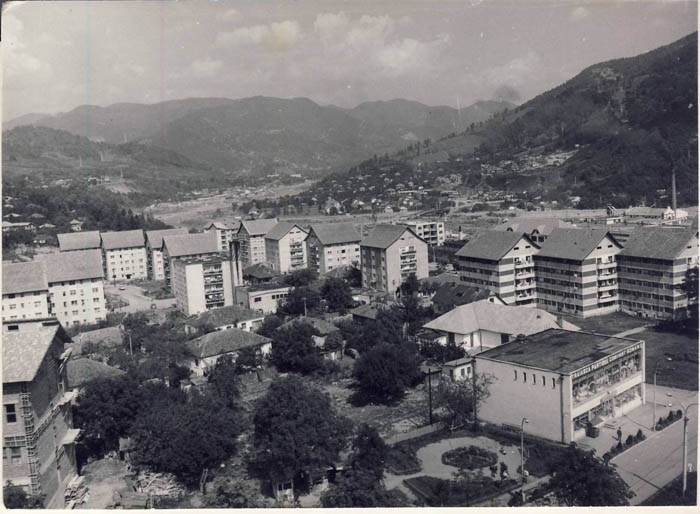
Nehoiu

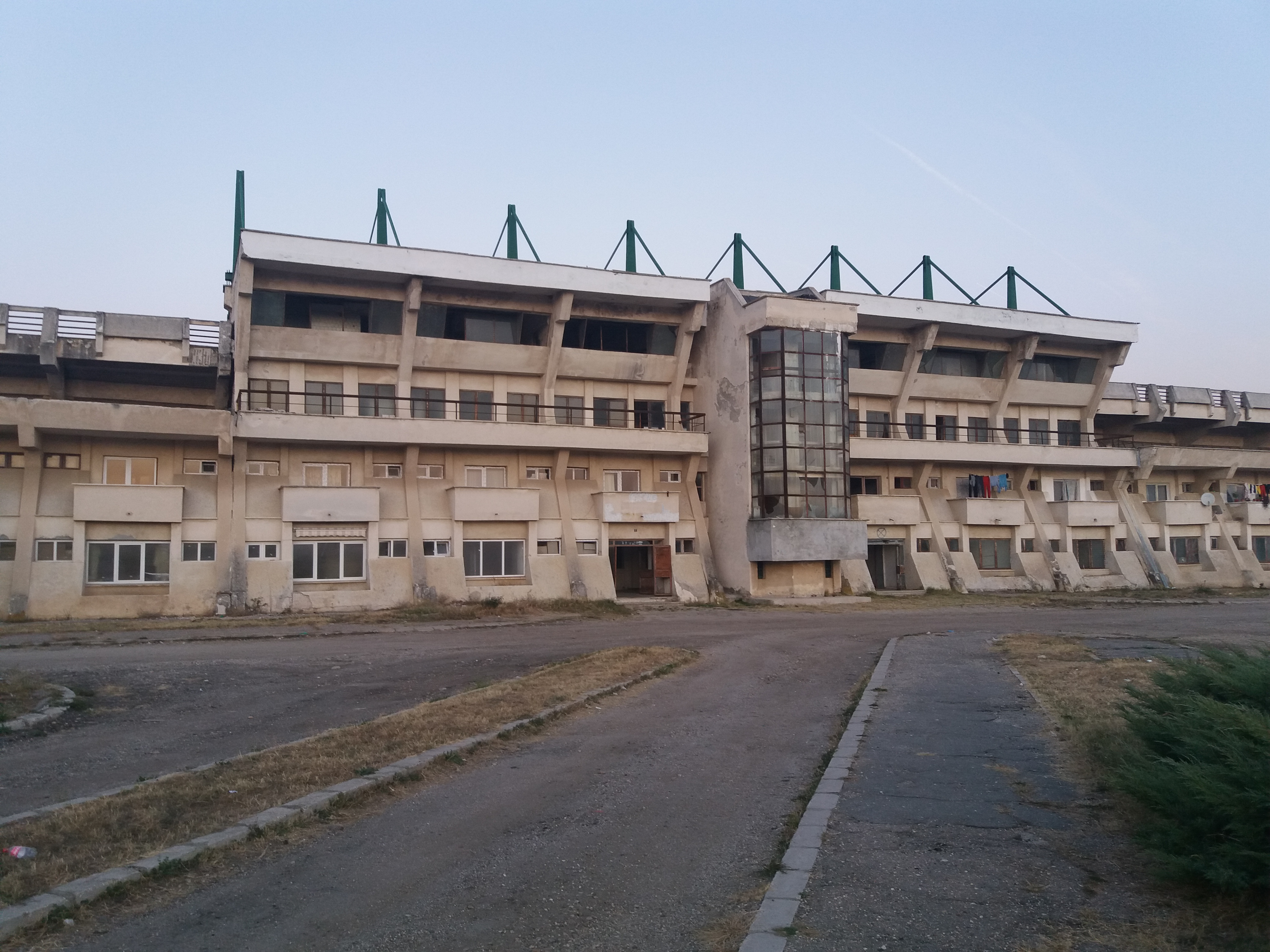
Stadionul Viitorul (Scornicești)

=== Towns created under Systematization ===
The program fell behind schedule, with only 24 new towns declared in 1989 out of the 100 expected by 1990. These 24 agro-industrial towns are listed below:

- Transylvania
  - Bihor County
    - Valea lui Mihai - Although agriculture remained predominant, small-scale industries were being developed. Around 30 apartment blocks were built in the center.
  - Hunedoara County
    - Aninoasa - A mining center in the upper Jiu Valley.
  - Maramureș County
    - Seini - Main industries: agriculture, animal breeding and fruit growing.
  - Mureș County
    - Iernut
  - Sibiu County
    - Avrig - The Mechanical Works at Mârșa (Mecanica Mârșa) was the most important industrial plant in the area.
    - Tălmaciu - Several timber factories and a textile plant. Blocks totalling 480 apartments were built.
- Wallachia
  - Argeș County
    - Colibași - Location of Automobile Dacia, Romania's first car manufacturing plant. Two national research institutes - for automotive engineering and nuclear technology - were also located there.
  - Brăila County
    - Ianca - A model for agro-industrial towns in flat regions.
    - Însurăței - Blocks totalling 330 apartments were built, of which 200 were located in the center.
  - Buzău County
    - Nehoiu - A model for agro-industrial towns in mountainous regions.
    - Pogoanele - Blocks totalling 200 apartments were built in the center.
  - Călărași County
    - Budești
    - Lehliu Gară - Its main industrial plant was a subsidiary of a clothes factory based in Bucharest.
    - Fundulea - Three important agricultural research institutes were based there, most of their staff commuting from Bucharest.
  - Giurgiu County
    - Bolintin-Vale - A satellite of Bucharest.
    - Mihăilești - Most of the former village razed and rebuilt to make way for the Danube–Bucharest Canal. Visited by Ceaușescu multiple times. Blocks totalling 3,500 apartments were built.
  - Gorj County
    - Bumbești-Jiu
    - Rovinari - Already a town as of 9 December 1981.
  - Olt County
    - Piatra Olt
    - Scornicești - The town with the most impressive record of medals, distinctions and titles in Socialist Romania, including that of "Hero of the New Agrarian Revolution". The new town had a factory making automobile spare parts, a clothes factory, a brewery, a dairy plant and a poultry farm.

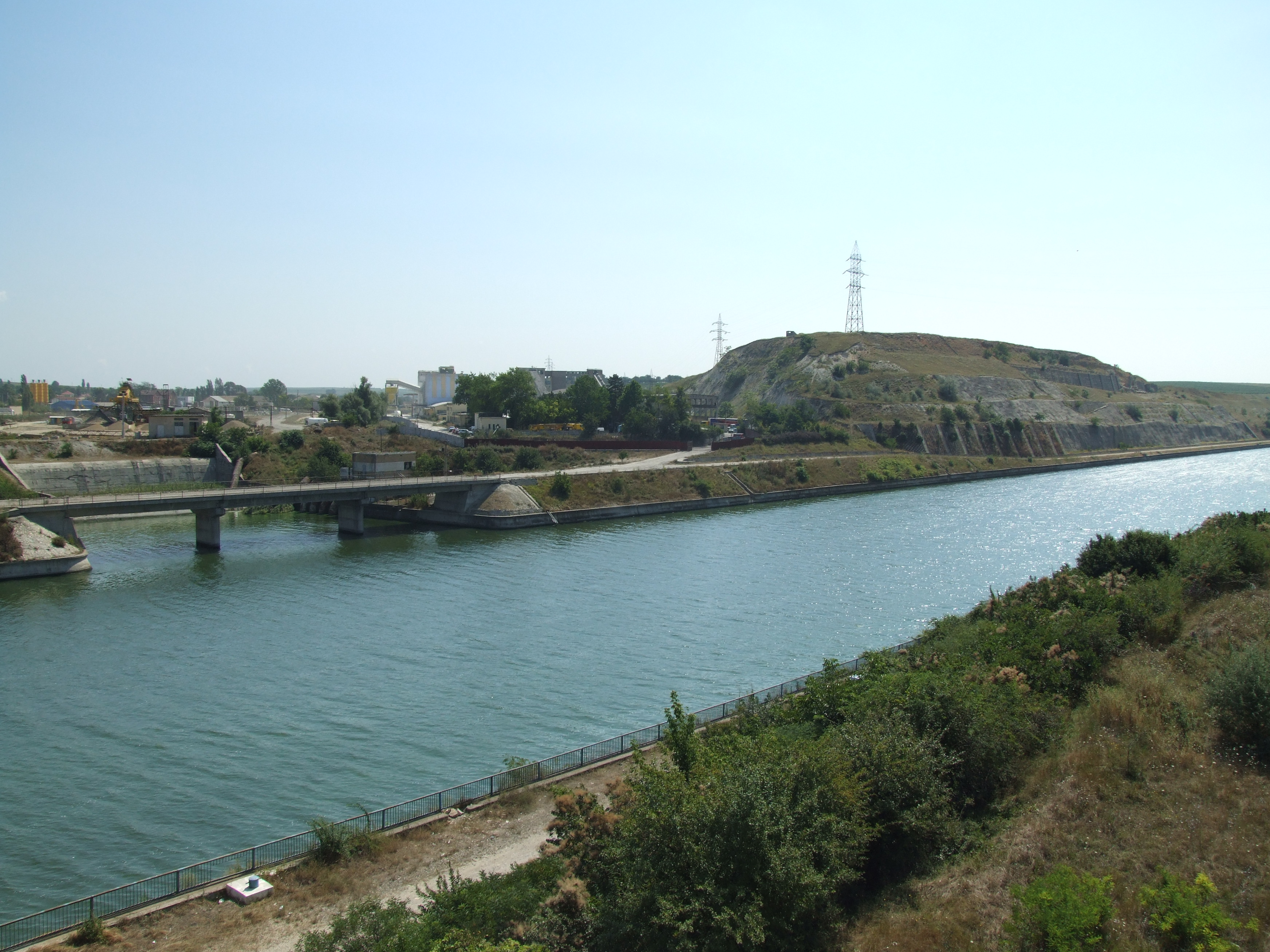
The Danube-Black Sea Canal at Basarabi/Murfatlar

- Dobruja
  - Constanța County
    - Basarabi - An inland harbor for the Danube–Black Sea Canal. There were also two large wineries.
    - Negru Vodă - Blocks totalling 341 apartments were built.
    - Ovidiu
- Moldavia
  - Bacău County
    - Dărmănești

=== Other rural settlements decisively impacted by Systematization which later became towns ===
Bragadiru, Cornetu, Balotești and Otopeni were likewise to become agro-industrial towns. Two hundred dump trucks were required to carry the rubble resulted from the demolition of many private houses in Otopeni, Dimieni and Odăile. In Bragadiru, Măgurele, Otopeni and 30 Decembrie blocks totalling thousands of apartments were built. Otopeni became a town on 28 November 2000. Bragadiru and Măgurele became towns on 29 December 2005.

== Cities ==
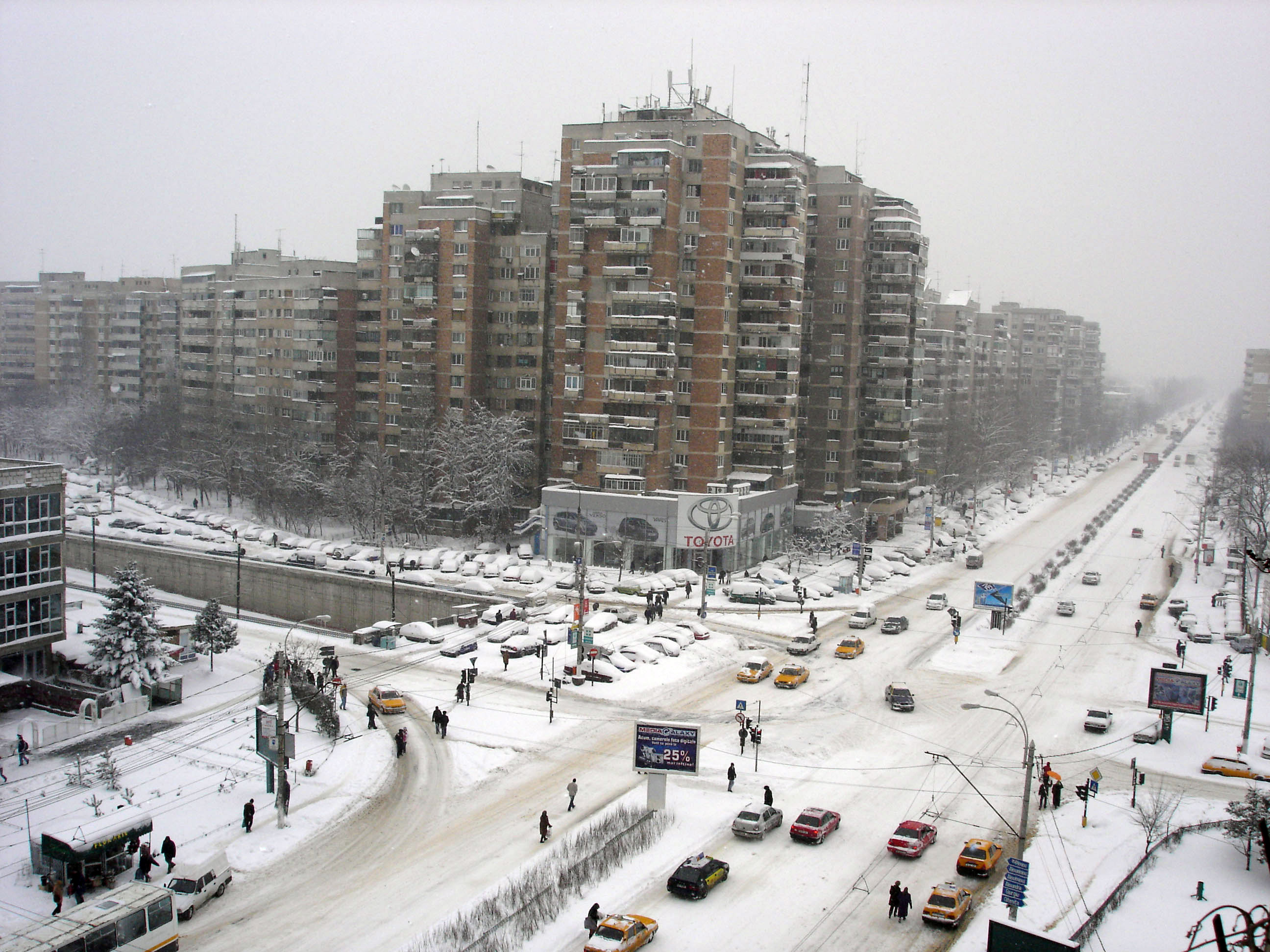
Militari neighbourhood in Bucharest. The population of Bucharest doubled between the beginning of the communist regime and the Romanian Revolution of 1989.

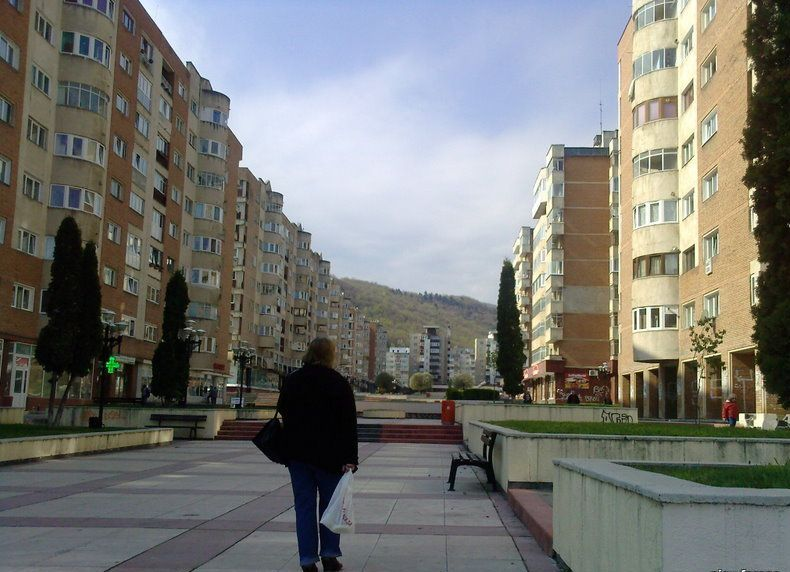
Brașov, Valea cetății

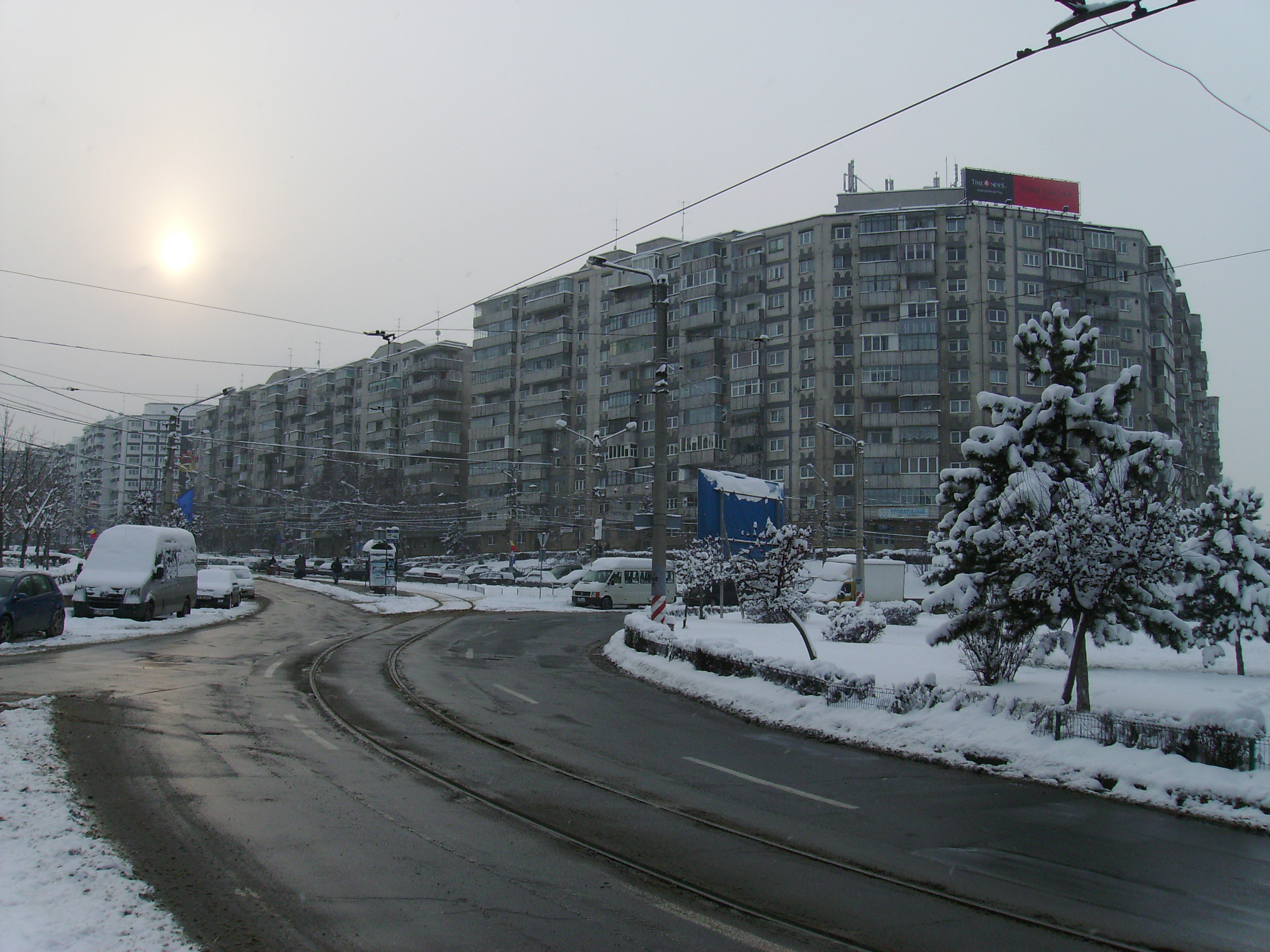
Communist blocks of flats in Mănăștur, Cluj. Unlike in many other cities, the reconstruction schemes in Cluj did not affect the historical old town.

In cities, the systematization programme consisted of demolishing existing buildings (often historic) and constructing new ones in their place. Iași, for instance, underwent major transformations in the 1970s and 1980s. Although tower blocks and other socialist-era buildings are present in all big cities across Romania, the degree to which the historic buildings (old town areas of cities) were affected varied by city. For example, old historical architecture managed to largely escape demolition in some, particularly in cities such as Cluj, where the reconstruction schemes affected primarily the marginal, shoddily built districts surrounding the historical city centre.

=== Bucharest Civic Centre ===
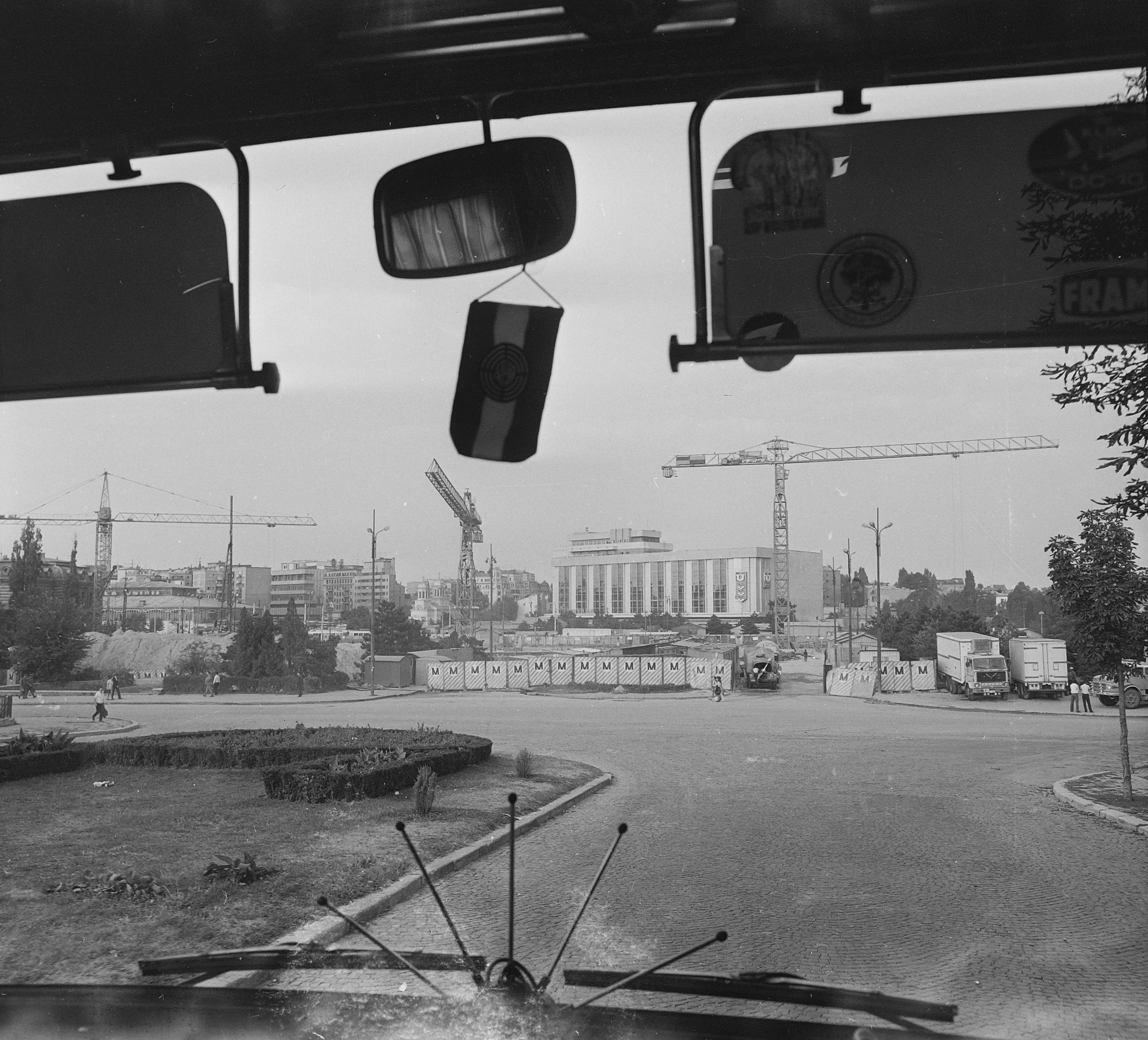
Unification Square in 1977 during the systematisation. The Unification Hall and the Unirea Shopping Center can be seen here

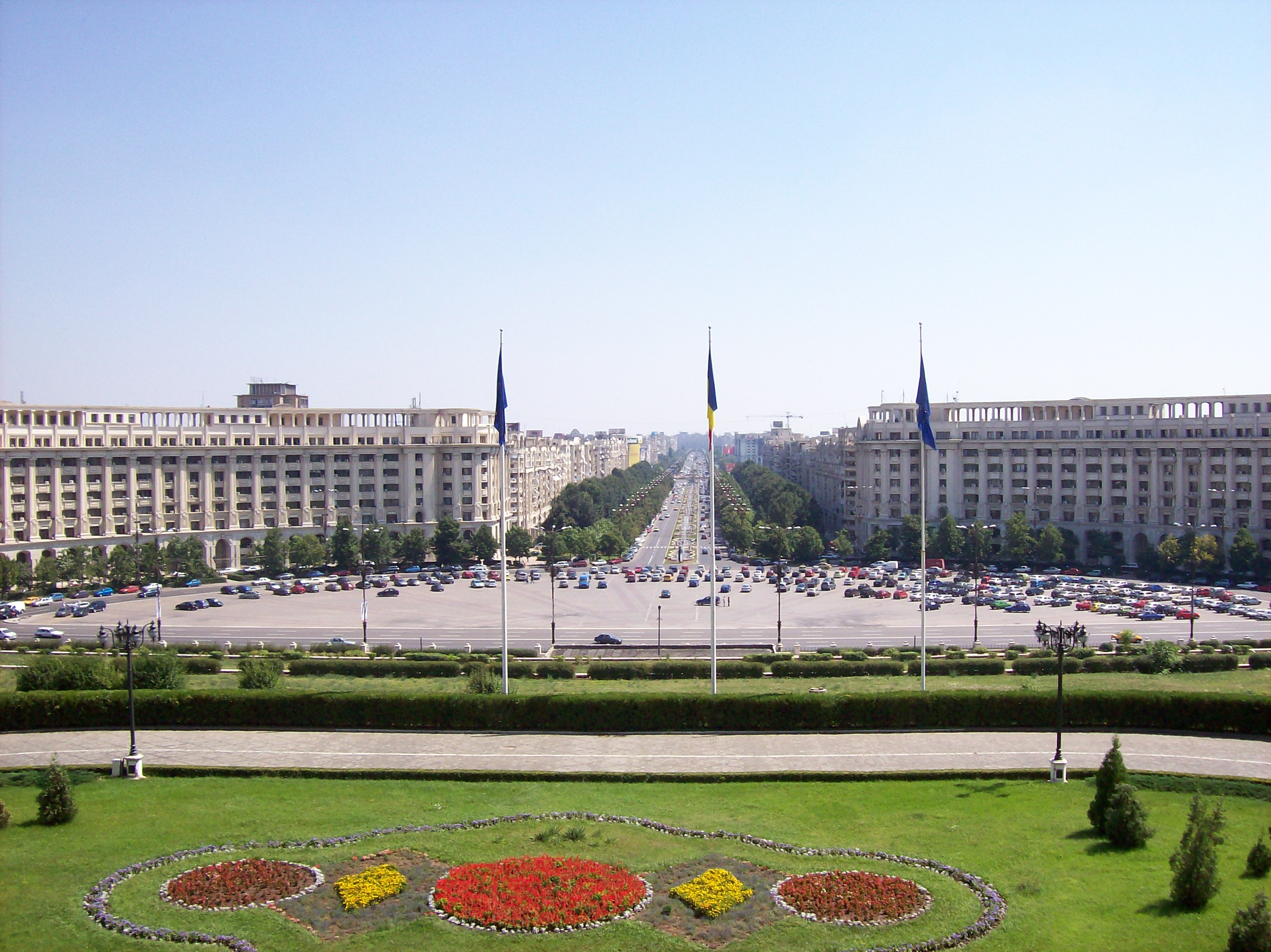
Civic Centre in Bucharest

The mass demolitions that occurred in the 1980s, under which an overall area of 5.9 square kilometres (2.3 sq mi) of the historic centre of Bucharest was levelled in order to make way for the grandiose Centrul Civic and House of the Republic, became the most extreme manifestation of the systematization policy. Many monuments were demolished including three monasteries, twenty churches, three synagogues, three hospitals, tel theatres, and the Stadionul Republicii, a noted Art Deco sports stadium. This also involved evicting 40,000 people with only a single day's notice and relocating them to new homes.

== International reactions ==
=== Hungary ===
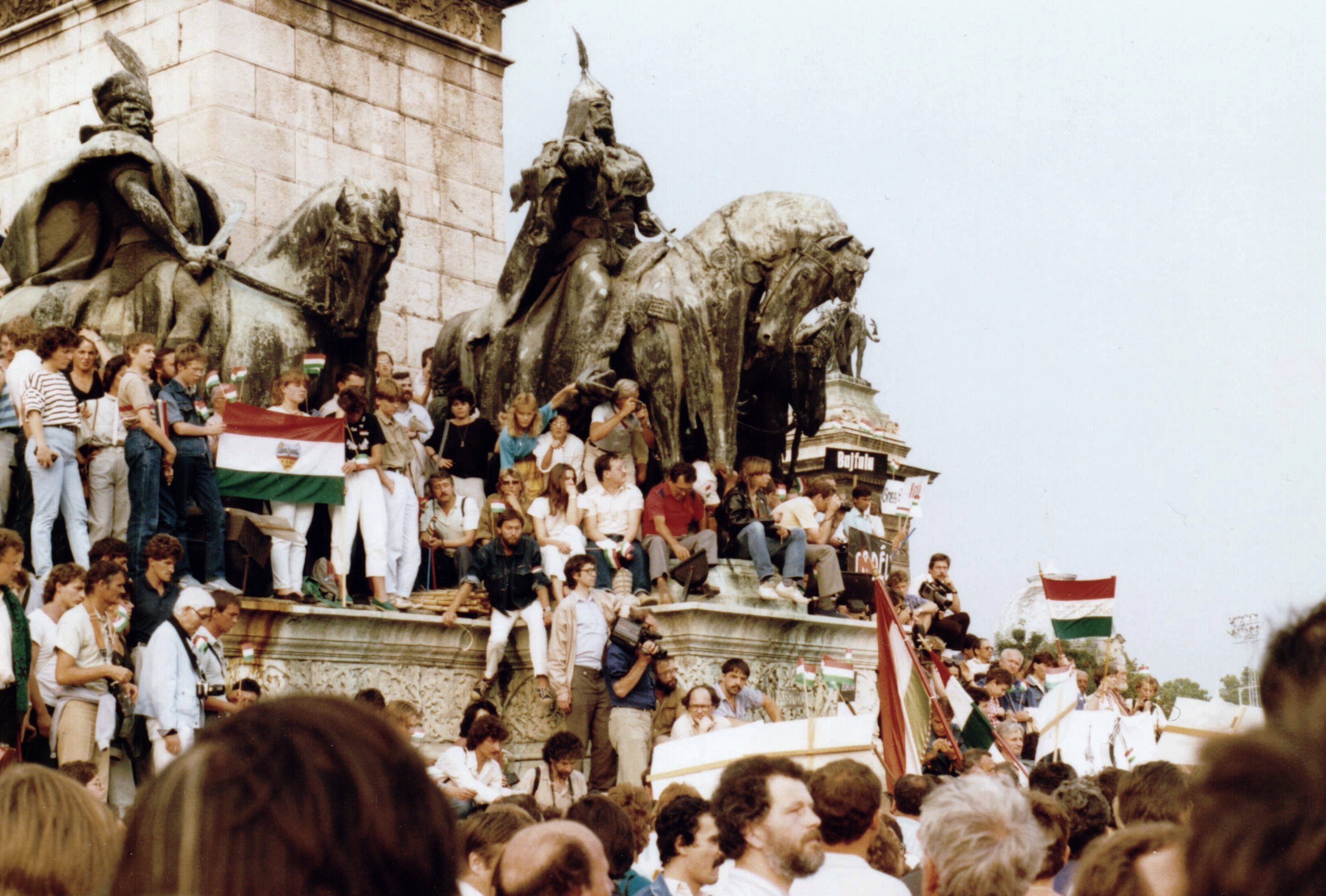
The 27 June 1988 protest rally in Budapest

In Hungary, the program is called "romániai falurombolás" (lit. "Romanian village destruction"). After May 1988, Transylvanian atrocity stories, particularly the flooding of the village of Bezidu Nou (Hungarian: Bözödújfalu), abounded in the Hungarian press. The Romanian regime drew unfavorable world opinion and came under increasing attack from the global press. In June 1988, 50,000 people protested in Budapest because the thousands of villages proposed for destruction by the Romanian Government included 1,500 ethnic Hungarian ones. That demonstration, taking place on 27 June, was the largest organized in Hungary since the Hungarian Revolution of 1956. The plan was also criticised by leading members of the Hungarian Socialist Workers' Party. In retaliation for the 27 June protest rally held in Budapest, Ceaușescu closed the Hungarian consulate in Cluj. To address these issues, and to comply with Mikhail Gorbachev's request, Károly Grósz met with Ceaușescu in Arad on 28 August 1988. The talks were fruitless, with Ceaușescu unwilling to concede or compromise on any point. He simply used the fact that talks were being held at all as a means to win time and regain some of his lost credibility. The meeting was seen in Hungary as a capitulation of the country's national interests and significantly damaged Grósz's own prestige.

=== Opération Villages Roumains ===
The scale of the potential destruction caused an international outcry to such an extent that it led to the creation of organizations such as the Belgian-based Opération Villages Roumains, which provided for the twinning of threatened Romanian villages with Western communities. Few of the villages were actually destroyed, systematization only really succeeding in "imprinting Romania onto the consciousness of Europe". Opération Villages Roumains was founded on 22 December 1988 in Brussels, being officially launched on 3 February 1989. By the beginning of May 1989, Romanian villages had been adopted by 231 communes in Belgium, 95 in France, and 42 in Switzerland. The Belgian effort was almost exclusively Wallonia. In its March 1989 session, the Council of Europe strongly condemned the liquidation of the villages, asking the authorities to cease the campaign. Shortly afterwards, in a speech broadcast by the BBC, the Prince of Wales publicly criticized this policy.

== See also ==
- Urban planning in communist countries
- Ceaușima
- Juche
- Hunger circus
- Street dogs in Bucharest

Eastern bloc housing:

- Panelák (Czechoslovakia)
- Panelház (Hungary)
- Plattenbau (East Germany)
- Ugsarmal bair (Mongolia)
- Khrushchyovka (Soviet Union)

== Bibliography ==
- Anania, Lidia; Luminea, Cecilia; Melinte, Livia; Prosan, Ana-Nina; Stoica, Lucia; and Ionescu-Ghinea, Neculai, Bisericile osândite de Ceaușescu. București 1977–1989 (1995). Editura Anastasia, Bucharest, ISBN 973-97145-4-4. In Romanian. Title means "Churches doomed by Ceaușescu". This is very much focused on churches, but along the way provides many details about systematization, especially the demolition to make way for Centrul Civic.
- Bucica, Cristina. Legitimating Power in Capital Cities: Bucharest – Continuity Through Radical Change? (PDF), 2000.
