= Valentin Ceaușescu =

Romanian physicist (born 1948)

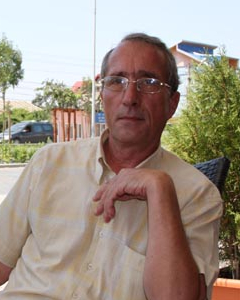
- Ceaușescu in 2009
- Born: 17 February 1948 (age 78); Bucharest, Romanian People's Republic
- Education: University of Bucharest; Imperial College London
- Spouses: Iordana Borilă (m. 1970; div. 1988) Roxana Dună (m. 1995)
- Children: 2
- Parents: Nicolae Ceaușescu (father); Elena Ceaușescu (mother)
- Relatives: Nicu Ceaușescu (brother); Zoia Ceaușescu (sister); Ilie Ceaușescu (uncle); Marin Ceaușescu (uncle)
- Scientific career
- Fields: Nuclear physics
- Workplaces: Institutul de Fizică Atomică

Valentin Ceaușescu (born 17 February 1948) is a Romanian physicist. He is the eldest and only surviving child of former Romanian President Nicolae Ceaușescu and First Lady Elena Ceaușescu.

== Biography ==
=== Early life and education ===
Valentin Ceaușescu was born in Bucharest on 17 February 1948. His father, future President Nicolae Ceaușescu, was an active member of the Romanian Workers' Party, earning himself various political and military positions; he was the country's Minister of Agriculture at the time Valentin was born. His mother was Elena Ceaușescu (née Petrescu). He had two siblings: Zoia, born in 1949 and Nicu, born in 1951.

Unlike many other members of his family, including his younger brother, Nicu, Valentin was not involved in politics. After graduating in 1965 from the Dr. Petru Groza High School, he enrolled in the Faculty of Physics of the University of Bucharest. In 1967, he decided to pursue further education by enrolling at Imperial College London in the United Kingdom. He played football as a goalkeeper on a college team during his time at Imperial College. After graduating in 1970 with a degree in physics, he returned to Romania.

=== Marriages and children ===
On 3 July 1970, Valentin Ceaușescu married Iordana (Dana) Borilă (1945–2017), the daughter of communist party leader Petre Borilă. Both fathers, then political rivals, strongly opposed their children's marriage. The resulting fight, which lasted for years, eventually resulted in Dana and Valentin divorcing in 1988. After the Romanian revolution, Dana and their child, Daniel, emigrated to Israel, before they went on from there to the United States; Daniel Ceaușescu, like his father, studied to be a physicist.

Valentin Ceaușescu later married for a second time in 1995; with his new wife, Roxana Dună, he has a daughter, Alexandra, who studied architecture.

=== Arrest and later life ===
In December 1989, during the Romanian Revolution, Valentin was arrested, along with the other members of his family. Known worldwide for their extravagant lifestyle, they were accused of undermining the economy of Romania. Valentin is said to have had a position managing the Steaua București football club. He reported that he had watched the trial of his parents on television while he was under arrest.

Valentin was freed from prison nine months later, after no charges were brought against him; both of his parents had been executed. During that time, his collection of 50 paintings by Romanian masters, engravings by Francisco Goya, in addition to hundreds of rare books, were confiscated. When he asked for restitution, the Romanian authorities argued that there were no documents that proved he was the owner, as well as that the art collection belonged to the Romanian state, which promptly donated them to the National Museum of Art. In 2001, Ceaușescu sued the government for restitution. The courts ruled in his favour in 2009 and ordered the museum to return forty pictures. Most of the works were collected by him and his former wife, Dana; he planned to give most of them to her.

== Scientific career ==
After completing his graduate work in 1970, Valentin Ceaușescu became a faculty member at the Horia Hulubei National Institute of Physics and Nuclear Engineering. Working at the Institutul de Fizică Atomică (IFA) lab in Măgurele, he performed nuclear physics research. He retired in 2016. It was reported that he lives modestly on his pension of about RON 2,000 (about €450). He lives in a house owned by his current father-in-law, Constantin Dună.

== Selected publications ==
- Müller, Berndt; Soff, Gerhard; Greiner, Walter; Ceaușescu, Valentin (1978). "Scaling behaviour of inner-shell ionization in superheavy quasi-molecules". Zeitschrift für Physik A. 285 (1): 27–30. Bibcode:1978ZPhyA.285...27M. doi:10.1007/BF01410218. S2CID 119420864.
- Răduță, A.A.; Ceaușescu, V.; Gheorghe, A.; Dreizler, R.M. (1982). "Phenomenological description of three interacting collective bands" (PDF). Nuclear Physics A. 381 (2): 253–276. Bibcode:1982NuPhA.381..253R. doi:10.1016/0375-9474(82)90143-9.
- Răduță, A.A.; Faessler, A.; Ceaușescu, V. (November 1987). "Description of the $K^{\pi}=1^{+}$ isovector states within a generalized coherent-state model". Phys. Rev. C. 36 (5): 2111–2126. Bibcode:1987PhRvC..36.2111R. doi:10.1103/PhysRevC.36.2111. PMID 9954324.
- Ceaușescu, Valentin (2013). "Some remarks on limits in quantization" (PDF). Romanian Journal of Physics. 58 (9–10): 1381–1395.
