= Vasile Maluțan =

Romanian aviation colonel

- Born: 1941-1942 (Note: Vasile Maluțan was 53 years old at the time of his death in May 1995, which implies he was born around 1941–1942.)
- Died: May 26, 1995; Fundulea, Călărași County, Romania
- Occupation: Aviation colonel
- Known for: Personal pilot of Nicolae Ceaușescu

Vasile Maluțan (died on May 26, 1995) was a Romanian aviation colonel and the personal pilot of Romanian dictator Nicolae Ceaușescu.

On 22 December 1989, he piloted (at gunpoint) the Eurocopter Dauphin helicopter that Nicolae and Elena Ceaușescu used to unsuccessfully flee the headquarters of the Central Committee during the Romanian Revolution. Maluțan lied to Ceaușescu, claiming that they had been discovered and were in danger of being shot down, and landed near Târgoviște. The Ceaușescus were eventually captured nearby, and later tried and executed.

Maluțan died on May 26, 1995, in a helicopter crash while conducting crop-dusting operations near Fundulea, Călărași County. The helicopter's tail got entangled in high-tension wires, leading to the crash. His death occurred shortly after he had testified before a parliamentary commission about the events of December 1989, raising various speculations and conspiracy theories about the circumstances of his accident.
