= Nicu Ceaușescu =

Romanian physicist and politician (1951–1996)

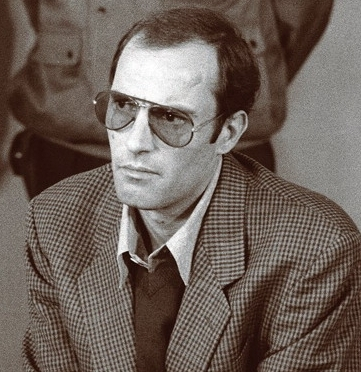
- Ceaușescu in 1990

First Secretary of the Sibiu Regional Committee of the Communist Party
- In office 17 October 1987 – 22 December 1989
- General Secretary: Nicolae Ceaușescu
- Succeeded by: Office abolished

Minister of Youth & First Secretary of the Union of Communist Youth
- In office 11 December 1982 – 17 October 1987
- Prime Minister: Constantin Dăscălescu
- Preceded by: Pantelimon Găvănescu
- Succeeded by: Ioan Toma

Member of the Great National Assembly
- In office 1981–1989
- Constituency: Buzău County

Personal details
- Born: Nicolae Ceaușescu; 1 September 1951 Bucharest, Romanian People's Republic
- Died: 26 September 1996 (aged 45) Vienna, Austria
- Resting place: Ghencea Cemetery, Bucharest
- Party: Romanian Communist Party (1971–1989)
- Spouse: Poliana Cristescu (m. 1983; div. 1985)
- Parents: Nicolae Ceaușescu (father); Elena Ceaușescu (mother)
- Relatives: Valentin Ceaușescu (brother); Zoia Ceaușescu (sister); Ilie Ceaușescu (uncle); Marin Ceaușescu (uncle)
- Education: University of Bucharest; Ștefan Gheorghiu Academy
- Profession: Physicist; politician
- Awards: Order of "August 23"; Order of Labor

Military service
- Allegiance: Romania
- Branch/service: Romanian Air Force
- Years of service: 1975–1976
- Rank: Lieutenant

Nicu Ceaușescu (Romanian pronunciation: [ˈniku tʃe̯a.uˈʃesku]; 1 September 1951 – 26 September 1996) was a Romanian physicist and communist politician who was the youngest child of Romanian leaders Nicolae and Elena Ceaușescu. He was a close associate of his father's political regime and considered the President's heir presumptive.

== Life during communism ==
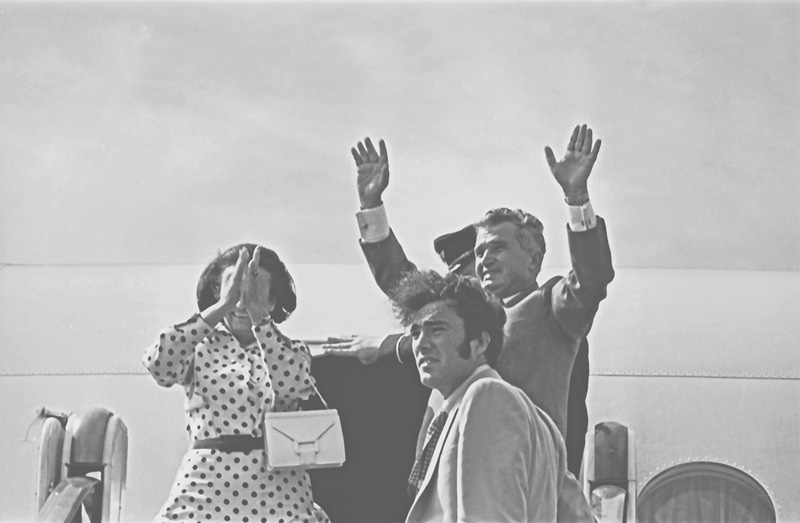
Nicu with his mother and father in 1976

According to Ion Mihai Pacepa (who defected to the United States in 1978), Ceaușescu wanted Nicu to become his Foreign Minister and for that, he instructed two high-ranked Party members, Ștefan Andrei and Cornel Pacoste (whom he considered brilliant communist intellectuals) to take care of Nicu's education; Pacepa further claimed that, unlike his older siblings, he disliked school and was allegedly derided by them for never being seen reading a book.

He graduated from Liceul no. 24 (now named Jean Monnet High School) and then studied physics at the University of Bucharest. He was involved in Uniunea Tineretului Comunist while a student, becoming its First Secretary and then Minister of Youth Issues, being elected to the Central Committee of the Romanian Communist Party in 1982.

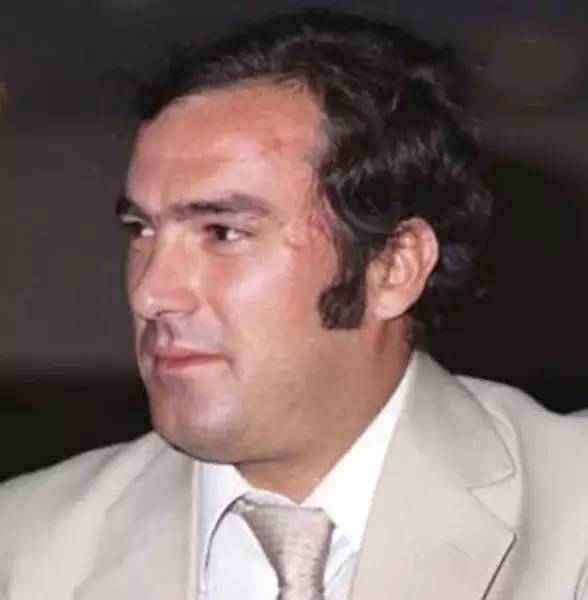
Nicu Ceaușescu in 1981

As an apprentice in politics, he was mentored by Ștefan Andrei, Ion Traian Ștefănescu and Cornel Pacoste. Toward the end of the 1980s, he was made a member of the Executive Committee of the Romanian Communist Party and in 1987 the leader for Sibiu County, being prepared by his parents to be his father's successor.

== Post-communist life and death ==
Since high school, Nicu was reputed to be a heavy drinker. Pacepa alleged that Nicu scandalized Bucharest with his rapes and car accidents. He claimed that his father heard about Nicu's drinking problem, but his solution was to work harder. He also allegedly lost large sums of money gambling around the world. Latif Yahia — former body double of Uday Hussein, son of Iraqi President Saddam Hussein — claimed that Nicu was good friends with Uday, and the two would visit each other in Switzerland and Monaco.

The documentary Videograms of a Revolution shows him exhibited as a prisoner on state television on 22 December 1989 after being arrested on accusations of holding children as hostages and other crimes. Three days later, his parents were tried and then executed by the military. He was also arrested in 1990 for misuse of government funds under his father's regime, and was sentenced to 20 years in prison.

Released in November 1992 because of cirrhosis, he died from the disease four years later in a Vienna hospital on 26 September 1996 aged 45.
