= Florin Constantiniu =

Romanian historian (1933–2012)

Florin Constantiniu (8 April 1933 – 11 April 2012) was a Romanian historian.

A native of Bucharest, he attended Saint Sava National College, followed by the University of Bucharest (1951–1956). Starting in 1957, he served as a researcher at the Nicolae Iorga Institute of History. He obtained his doctorate from the same university in 1968, with thesis "Agrarian relations in Wallachia in the 18th century". He was elected a corresponding member of the Romanian Academy in 1999, and was granted full membership status in 2006.

He died in Bucharest at age 79, and was buried in the city's Ghencea Military Cemetery.

== Publications ==
- Ceaușescu, Ilie; Constantiniu, Florin; Ionescu, Mihail E. (1984), 200 de zile mai devreme. Rolul României în scurtarea celui de-al doilea război mondial, București: Editura Științifică și Enciclopedică
- Constantiniu, Florin (1984), August 1944: Repere istorice, București: Editura Stiințifică și Enciclopedică
- Constantiniu, Florin (1985), Constantin Mavrocordat, București: Editura Militară
- Cernovodeanu, Paul; Constantiniu, Florin (1989), Constantin Brâncoveanu, București: Editura Academiei Republicii Socialiste România
- Constantiniu, Florin; Duțu, Alesandru; Retegan, Mihai (1995), România în război 1941 – 1945: un destin în istorie, București: Editura Militară
- Constantiniu, Florin; Schipor, Ilie (1995), Trecerea Nistrului (1941): o decizie controversată, București: Editura Albatros
- Constantiniu, Florin (1997), O istorie sinceră a poporului român, București: Editura Univers enciclopedic
- Constantiniu, Florin (1997), Doi ori doi fac șaisprezece. A început războiul rece în România?, București: Editura Eurosong Book
- Constantiniu, Florin (1998), De la războiul fierbinte la războiul rece, București: Editura Corint
- Constantiniu, Florin (1999), O istorie sinceră a poporului român, Ediția a II-a revăzută și adăugită, București: Editura Univers enciclopedic
- Constantiniu, Florin (2008), O istorie sinceră a poporului român, Ediția a IV-a revăzută și adăugită, București: Univers Enciclopedic
- Constantiniu, Florin (2001), P.C.R., Pătrășcanu și Transilvania (1945 – 1946), București: Editura Enciclopedică
- Constantiniu, Florin (2002), 1941. Hitler, Stalin și România: România și geneza Operațiunii "Barbarossa", București: Editura Univers enciclopedic
- Constantiniu, Florin (2003), Diplomații români și devierea de dreapta, Seria Biblioteca de istorie, București: Editura Tritonic
- Constantiniu, Florin; Pop, Adrian (2007), Schisma roșie. România și declanșarea conflictului sovieto-iugoslav (1948 – 1950), București: Editura Compania
- Constantiniu, Florin (2007), De la Răutu și Roller la Mușat și Ardeleanu, București: Editura Enciclopedică
