= Valentin Coșereanu =

Romanian footballer

Personal information
- Date of birth: 17 July 1991 (age 35)
- Place of birth: Scornicești, Romania
- Height: 1.87 m (6 ft 2 in)
- Position: Midfielder

Team information
- Current team: AFC Câmpulung Muscel
- Number: 10

Youth career
- 1998–2003: LPS Pitești
- 2003–2009: Dacia Mioveni

Senior career*
Years	Team	Apps	(Gls)
2009–2012	Mioveni	84	(4)
2013–2014	Concordia Chiajna	29	(0)
2014–2015	CSMS Iași	7	(1)
2015	SCM Pitești	8	(0)
2016–2017	Gaz Metan Mediaș	10	(2)
2018–2024	Mioveni	146	(11)
2025–2026	AFC Câmpulung Muscel	32	(1)
2026–	ARO Câmpulung	0	(0)

International career
2011–2012	Romania U21	2	(0)
- * Club domestic league appearances and goals as of 9 May 2026

Valentin Coșereanu (born 17 July 1991) is a Romanian professional footballer who plays as a midfielder for Liga II club ARO Câmpulung.

== Honours ==
Gaz Metan Mediaș

- Liga II: 2015–16
