= Radu Băldescu =

Romanian general

- Born: October 16, 1888; Mihăileștii de Sus, Olt County, Kingdom of Romania
- Died: December 2, 1953 (aged 65); Jilava Prison, București Region, Romanian People's Republic
- Military career
- Allegiance: Kingdom of Romania
- Branch: Army
- Rank: major general
- Commands: 5th Corps Area, 6th Corps
- Conflicts: Second Balkan War; World War I; World War II; Eastern Front; Siege of Sevastopol; Battle of the Sea of Azov; Crimean campaign; Battle of Stalingrad
- Awards: Order of Michael the Brave, 3rd Class; Iron Cross, 1st and 2nd Class

Radu Băldescu (16 October 1888 – 2 December 1953) was a Romanian major general during World War II.

== Biography ==
Băldescu was born on 16 October 1888, at Mihăileștii de Sus, a village that now belongs to Scornicești, Olt County, Romania, in the family of a priest. He was admitted in the Infantry Officers School in 1909 and graduated in 1911, receiving the rank of 2nd lieutenant on 1 July. He fought with the 3rd Regiment Dorobanți Olt in the Second Balkan War (1913), and in World War I and its aftermath (1916–1919). He advanced in rank to lieutenant in 1914, captain in 1917, and major in 1920. After the war he was admitted to the Higher War School, which he graduated in 1921.

He then moved to Sibiu, where he taught at the newly founded Infantry and Cavalry Officers School. He was promoted to lieutenant colonel in 1929 and colonel in 1935. Băldescu pursued his military career in 1936 as commanding officer of the 93rd Infantry Regiment Cloșca in Arad. In 1937, he returned to Sibiu, where he became commandant of the Officers School. On August 1, 1940, he became commanding officer of the 16th Infantry Brigade in Satu Mare; a month later, his brigade had to leave Northern Transylvania, which was ceded to Hungary as a result of the Second Vienna Award. On September 15 Băldescu became Deputy General Officer Commanding 18th Division, and was promoted to brigadier general on May 10, 1941.

Romania joined Operation Barbarossa on June 22, 1941, in order to reclaim the lost territories of Bessarabia and Northern Bukovina, which had been annexed by the Soviet Union in June 1940. The 18th Division was kept in reserve until the fall, when it was sent to the Romanian 4th Army to take part in the Siege of Odessa, being subordinated to the 3rd Corps. Băldescu was General Officer Commanding 18th Division in 1942, serving in the 6th Army Corps under the command of General Corneliu Dragalina.

Băldescu went into reserve in 1944, but later that year became Deputy General Officer Commanding 6th Corps Area. In 1945, he started as General Officer Commanding 5th Corps Area and then became General Officer Commanding 6th Corps. Băldescu went into reserve again from 1946 to 1947, and retired in 1947.

In 1951, he was arrested by the Securitate and never heard of again. Records show he died on 2 December 1953 at Jilava Prison.

== Awards ==
- Order of Michael the Brave, 3rd Class (1 September 1942)
- Iron Cross
  - 1st Class (July 1942)
  - 2nd Class (28 February 1942)
