= Scornicești Solar Park =

Photovoltaic power stations in Romania

- Country: Romania
- Location: Scornicești, Olt County
- Coordinates: 44°33′43″N 24°33′49″E
- Status: Operational
- Commission date: December 2011
- Construction cost: €3 million

Solar farm
- Type: Flat-panel PV

Power generation
- Units operational: 4,176
- Nameplate capacity: 1 MW
- Annual net output: 1,300 MWh

Scornicești Solar Park, a large thin-film photovoltaic (PV) power system, is built on a 5 ha (12 acres) plot of land near the town of Scornicești in Romania. The power plant is a 1-megawatt solar power system using 4,176 240 Wp panels of state-of-the-art thin film technology, and was completed in December 2011. The solar park was expected to supply 1,300 MWh of electricity per year. Construction began in September 2011 and was completed in December of the same year.

The installation is in Olt County, in southern Romania. The investment cost for the Scornicești solar park amounted to some €3 million.

== See also ==
- Energy policy of the European Union
- Photovoltaics
- Renewable energy commercialization
- Renewable energy in the European Union
- Solar power in Romania
