= Viitorul Stadium (Scornicești) =

Romanian stadium

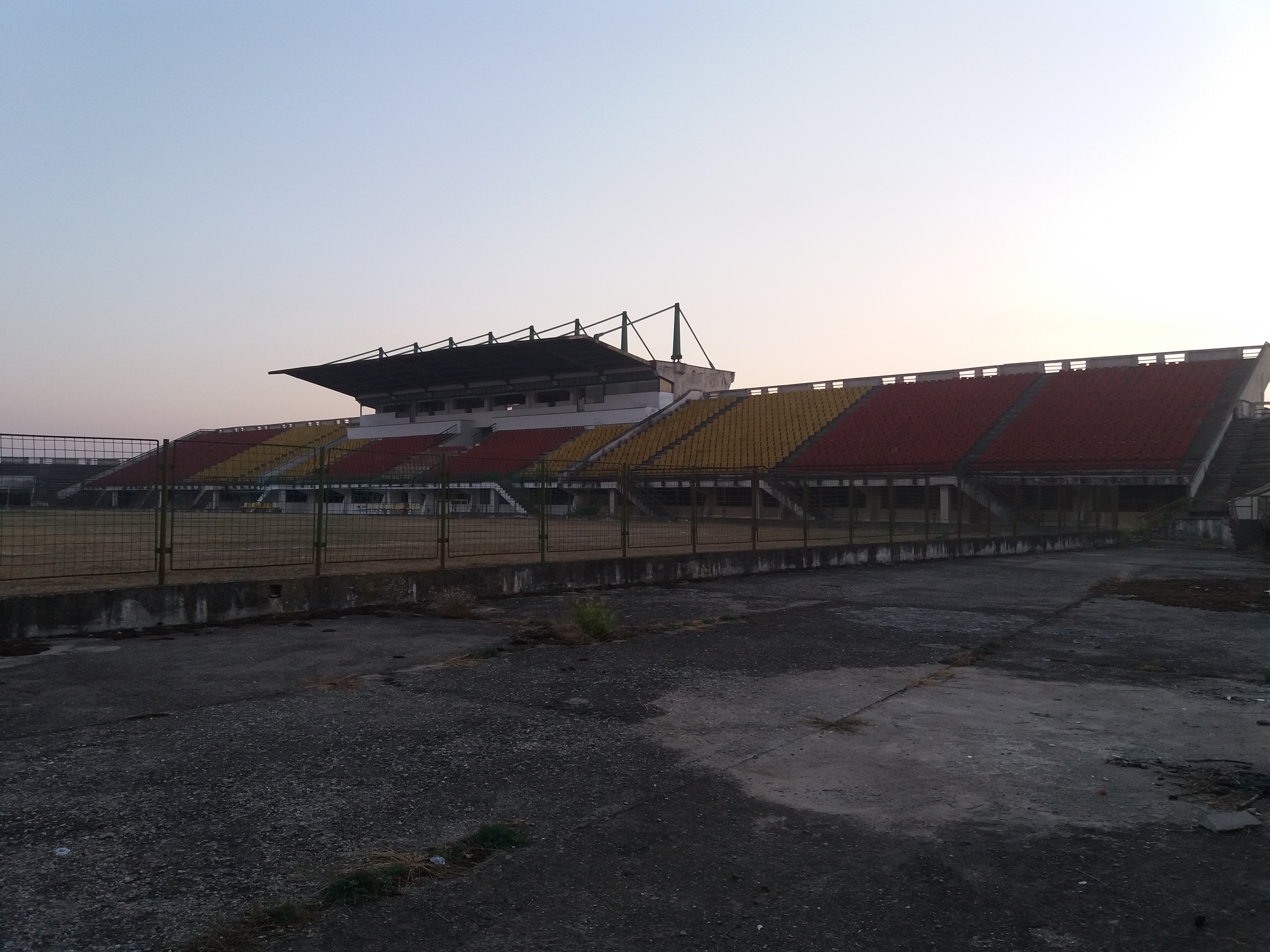
- Interactive map of Viitorul Stadium
- Address: Str. Pompierilor, nr. 2
- Location: Scornicești, Romania
- Coordinates: 44°35′34″N 24°33′5″E
- Owner: Town of Scornicești
- Operator: Olt Scornicești
- Capacity: 13,500 (restricted from 18,000)
- Surface: Grass

Construction
- Opened: 1975

Tenant
- Olt Scornicești (1975–present)

The Viitorul Stadium is a multi-purpose stadium in Scornicești, Olt County, Romania. It is currently used mostly for football matches and is the home ground of FC Olt Scornicești. It is the 24th stadium in the country by capacity. The stadium holds 13,500 people, the capacity being restricted from 18,000 due to advanced level of degradation.

== History ==
The stadium was opened in 1975, with a capacity of 30,000 seats. The facilities of the stadium at the time of construction included: seats at the first stand (first stadium in Romania that had seats), official stand, press rooms, changing rooms, sauna, swimming pool under the second stand, a pitch with water drainage system, living rooms for the cantonments (under the first stand).

The stadium was used by the FC Olt Scornicești, football team which was founded in 1973 and represented the village of dictator Nicolae Ceaușescu, from which he received support to reach Divizia A, soon became one of the best teams in the Romanian rural area. FC Olt played several seasons in the top-flight, promoting in 1981 and being helped to not relegate. After the fall of the communist regime, the club lost its main support, relegated in 1990 and since then has not promoted above the third tier.

Today the first stand has apartments that are used by needy families, while the other stands are not used and they are gradually falling apart. Thus in 1988 the stadium had 25,000 seats, the capacity falling to 18,000 seats, then to 13,500 in 2017.
