= Romanian Journal of Physics =

- Discipline: Physics
- Language: English
- Edited by: Emil Burzo

Publication details
- Former name: Revue Roumaine de Physique
- History: 1964–present
- Publisher: Editura Academiei Române (Romania)
- Frequency: 10/year
- Open access: Yes
- Impact factor: 1.9 (2024)

Standard abbreviations
- ISO 4: Rom. J. Phys.

Indexing
- CODEN: RJPHEC
- ISSN: 1221-146X
- LCCN: 93645976
- OCLC no.: 716744078

Links
- Journal homepage; Editorial Board; Submission Instructions for Authors

The Romanian Journal of Physics is a peer-reviewed open access scientific journal covering physics. It is published by the Editura Academiei Române. The journal was established in 1956 as the Revue de physique and renamed Revue Roumaine de physique in 1964, obtaining its current title in 1994. The editor-in-chief is Emil Burzo.

== Abstracting and indexing ==
The journal is abstracted and indexed in the Science Citation Index Expanded and Scopus.
