= Zoia Ceaușescu =

Romanian mathematician (1949–2006)

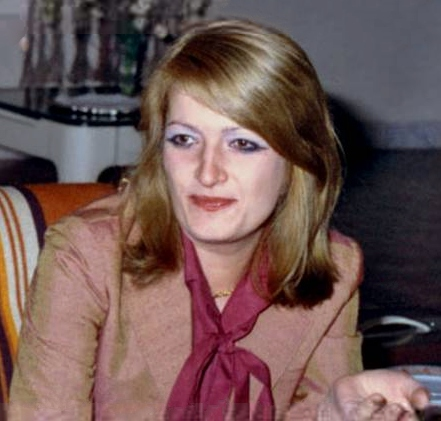
- Zoia Ceaușescu in 1981
- Born: 28 February 1949; Bucharest, People's Republic of Romania
- Died: 20 November 2006 (aged 57); Bucharest, Romania
- Education: University of Bucharest
- Spouse: Mircea Oprean (m. 1980)
- Parents: Nicolae Ceaușescu (father); Elena Ceaușescu (mother)
- Relatives: Nicu Ceaușescu (brother); Valentin Ceaușescu (brother); Ilie Ceaușescu (uncle); Marin Ceaușescu (uncle)
- Awards: Simion Stoilow Prize
- Scientific career
- Fields: Mathematics
- Workplaces: Institute of Mathematics of the Romanian Academy; INCREST
- Thesis: On Intertwining Dilations (1977)
- Doctoral advisor: Ciprian Foias

Zoia Ceaușescu (Romanian pronunciation: [ˈzoja tʃe̯a.uˈʃesku]; 28 February 1949 – 20 November 2006) was a Romanian mathematician, the daughter of Communist leader Nicolae Ceaușescu and his wife, Elena and sister of Nicu Ceaușescu and Valentin Ceaușescu. She was also known as Tovarășa Zoia (comrade Zoia).

== Biography ==
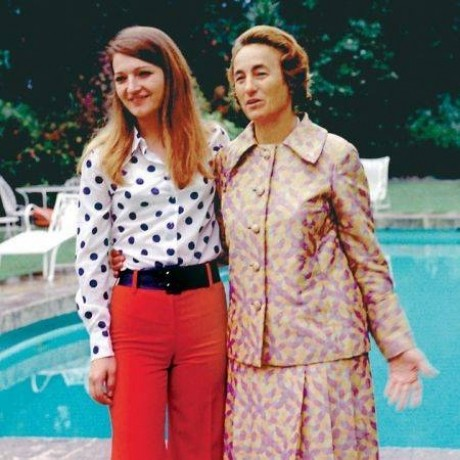
Zoia with her mother Elena in 1978

Zoia Ceaușescu studied at High School nr. 24 (now Jean Monnet High School) in Bucharest and graduated in 1966. She then continued her studies at the Faculty of Mathematics, University of Bucharest. She received her Ph.D. in 1977 with thesis On Intertwining Dilations written under the direction of Ciprian Foias. Ceaușescu worked as a researcher at the Institute of Mathematics of the Romanian Academy in Bucharest starting in 1974. Her field of specialization was functional analysis. Allegedly, her parents were unhappy with their daughter's choice of doing research in mathematics, so the Institute was disbanded in 1975. She moved on to work for Institutul pentru Creație Științifică și Tehnică (INCREST, Institute for Scientific and Technical Creativity), where she eventually started and headed a new department of mathematics. In 1976, Ceaușescu received the Simion Stoilow Prize for her outstanding contributions to the mathematical sciences.

She was married in 1980 to Mircea Oprean, an engineer and professor at the Polytechnic University of Bucharest.

During the Romanian Revolution, on 24 December 1989, she was arrested for "undermining the Romanian economy", and released eight months later, on 18 August 1990. After she was freed, she tried unsuccessfully to return to her former job at INCREST, then gave up and retired. After the revolution, some newspapers reported that she had lived a wild life, having numerous lovers and often being drunk.

After her parents were executed, the new government confiscated the house where she and her husband lived (the house was used as proof of allegedly stolen wealth), so she and her husband had to live with friends and relatives.

After the revolution that ousted her parents, Zoia reported that during her parents' time in power her mother had asked the Securitate to keep an eye on the Ceaușescu children, perhaps she felt, out of a "sense of love". The Securitate "could not touch" the children she said, but the information they provided created a lot of problems for the children. She also remarked that power had a "destructive effect" on her father and that he "lost his sense of judgement".

Zoia Ceaușescu believed that her parents were not buried in Ghencea Cemetery; she attempted to have their remains exhumed, but a military court refused her request. The bodies were exhumed for identification and confirmed to be of her parents in 2010, after her death.

Zoia was a chain smoker. She died of lung cancer in 2006, at the age of 57, and her remains were cremated at the Cenușa Crematorium.

== Selected publications ==
Zoia Ceaușescu published 22 scientific papers between 1976 and 1988. Some of those are:

- Ceaușescu, Zoia; Vasilescu, Florian-Horia (1978). "Tensor products and the joint spectrum in Hilbert spaces". Proceedings of the American Mathematical Society. 72 (3). American Mathematical Society: 505–508. doi:10.1090/S0002-9939-1978-0509243-8. JSTOR 2042460. MR 0509243.
- Ceaușescu, Zoia (1979). "Lifting of a contraction intertwining two isometries". Michigan Mathematical Journal. 26 (2): 231–241. doi:10.1307/mmj/1029002216. MR 0532324.
- Arsene, Grigore; Ceaușescu, Zoia; Constantinescu, Tiberiu (1988). "Schur analysis of some completion problems". Linear Algebra and Its Applications. 109: 1–35. doi:10.1016/0024-3795(88)90195-4. MR 0961563.
