= Scornicești =

- Town
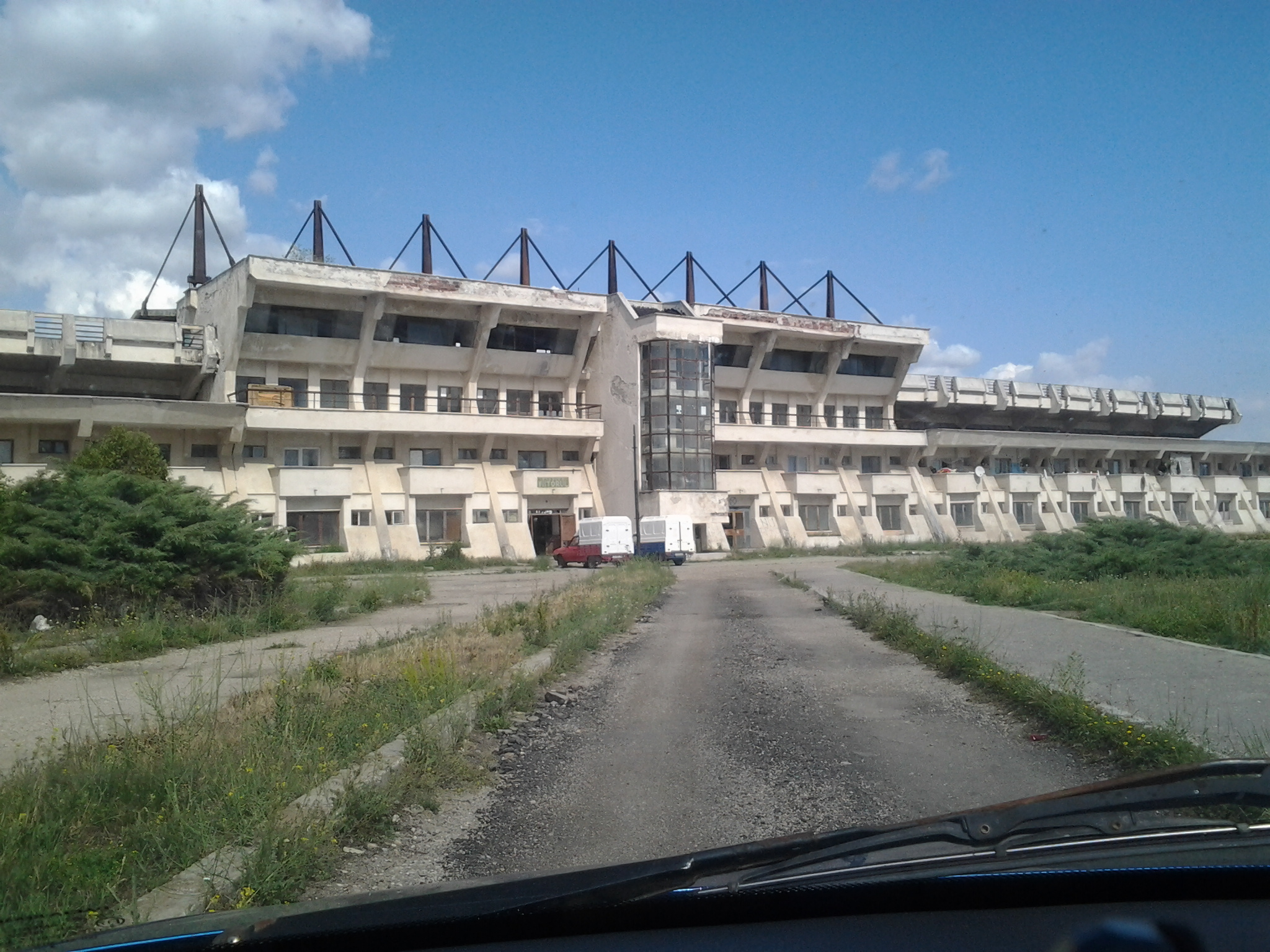
- The Scornicești stadium

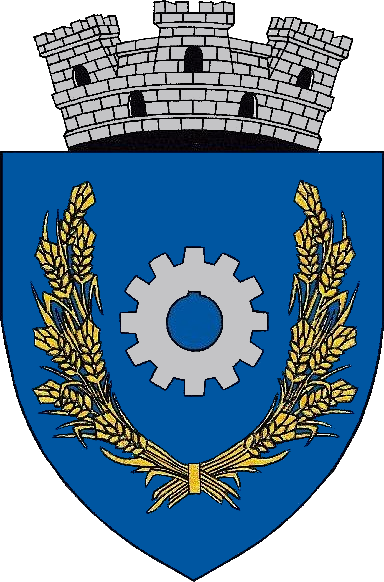
- Coat of arms

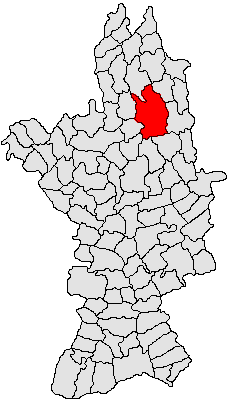
- Location in Olt County

- Location in Romania
- Coordinates: 44°35′42″N 24°32′49″E
- Country: Romania
- County: Olt

Government
  - Mayor (2024–2028): Daniel Tudor (PSD)
- Area: 168.77 km^{2} (65.16 sq mi)
- Population (2021-12-01): 10,795
  - Density: 63.963/km^{2} (165.66/sq mi)
- Time zone: UTC+02:00 (EET)
  - Summer (DST): UTC+03:00 (EEST)
- Postal code: 235600
- Area code: (+40) 02 49
- Vehicle reg.: OT
- Website: www.primariascornicesti.ro

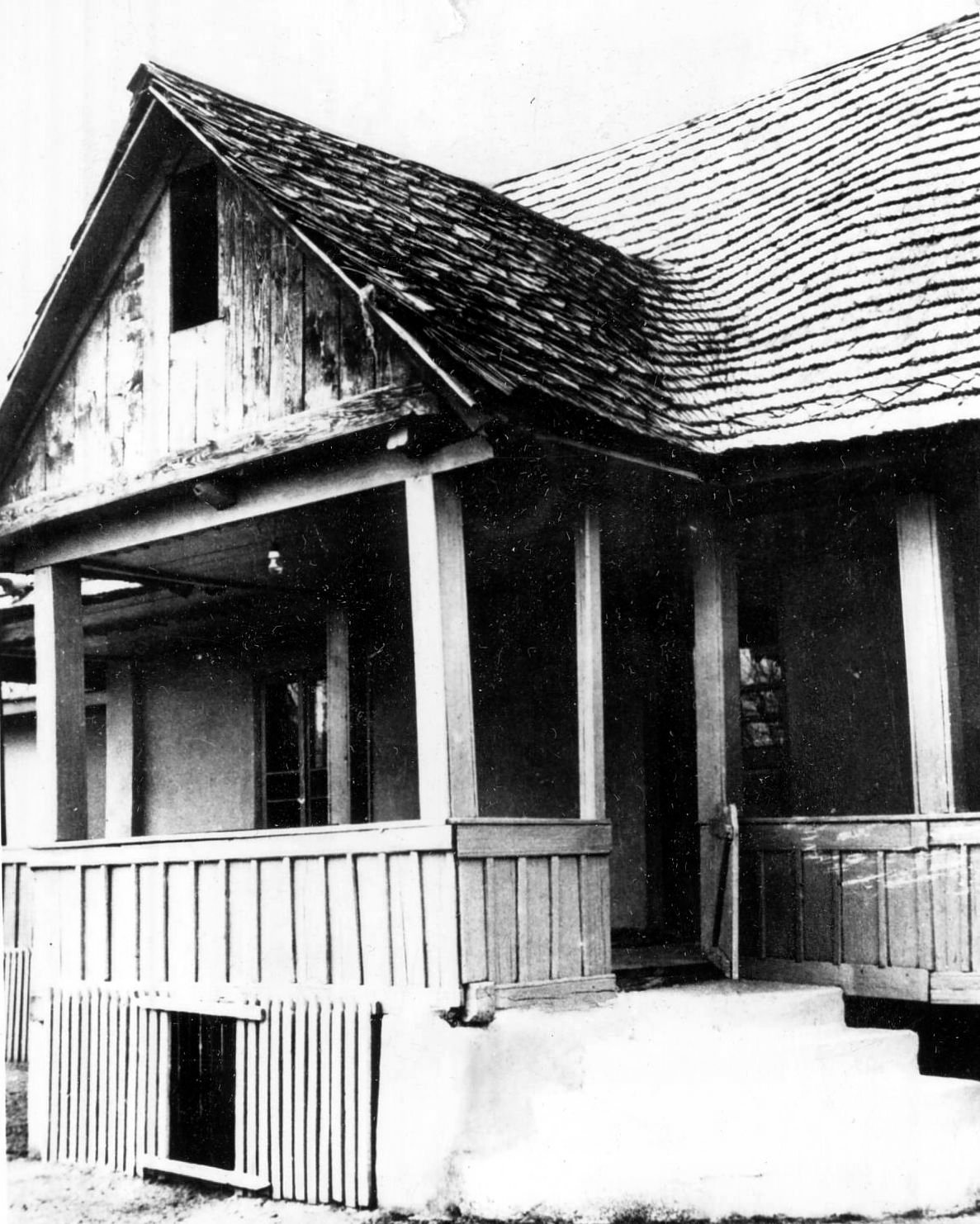
The house in which Nicolae Ceaușescu was born in 1918

Scornicești (Romanian pronunciation: [skorniˈtʃeʃtʲ]) is a town in Olt County, Romania, with a population of 10,795. The town administers 13 villages (Bălțați, Bircii, Chițeasca, Constantinești, Jitaru, Mărgineni-Slobozia, Mihăilești-Popești, Mogoșești, Negreni, Piscani, Rusciori, Șuica, and Teiuș) and has a total area of 170 km^{2} (66 sq mi), being the locality with the largest area in the county of Olt, surpassing even its capital, Slatina. Scornicești is situated in the historical region of Oltenia. It officially became a town in 1989, as a result of the Romanian rural systematization program.

== History ==
Historical population
Year	Pop.	±%
1992	13,998	—
2002	13,751	−1.8%
2011	11,766	−14.4%
2021	10,795	−8.3%
Source: Census data

Scornicești was the birthplace of communist leader Nicolae Ceaușescu, who lived there until the age of 11, when he left for Bucharest to become a shoemaker. During his dictatorship, Ceaușescu wanted to make Scornicești a "model town" to house the newly created "Socialist Man". Consequently, in 1988, he began his plan by demolishing the traditional village houses and replacing them with apartment buildings, and changed the town's status from "village" to "city" (however, the bulldozers did not destroy Ceaușescu's birth home, which is now one of the local attractions - see on WikiMapia).

Ceaușescu also built a large stadium (with a capacity of 18,000 spectators) for the local football team, FC Olt, which, with the help of the Ceaușescus, was promoted to Divizia A. Nowadays, the team plays in the Olt County Championship.

The Scornicești Solar Park power system of solar panels is located in the town.

== Natives ==
- Radu Băldescu (1888–1953), major general during World War II
- Ion Barbu (born 1977), footballer
- Marin Ceaușescu (1916–1989), economist and diplomat, the older brother of Nicolae
- Nicolae Ceaușescu (1918–1989), communist politician, general secretary of the Romanian Communist Party from 1965 to 1989, and the second and last communist leader of Romania
- Valentin Coșereanu (born 1991), footballer
- Emil Dică (born 1982), footballer
