= Marin Ceaușescu =

Romanian diplomat and economist

- Born: 2 February 1916; Scornicești, Olt County, Romania
- Died: 28 December 1989 (aged 73); Vienna, Austria
- Education: Bucharest Academy of Economic Studies
- Occupations: Diplomat; economist
- Children: 2
- Relatives: Nicolae Ceaușescu (brother); Ilie Ceaușescu (brother); Nicu Ceaușescu (nephew); Valentin Ceaușescu (nephew); Zoia Ceaușescu (niece)

Marin Ceaușescu (2 February 1916 – 28 December 1989) was a Romanian economist and diplomat, the older brother of Communist Romania's President Nicolae Ceaușescu.

He was born in 1916 in Scornicești, Olt County, the son of Lixandra (née Militaru) and Andruță Ceaușescu. After completing 4 years of school, he decided not to pursue his studies, but to help instead his parents with the farm work. In 1935 he joined the Romanian Communist Party. He later graduated from the Academy of Economic Studies in Bucharest. Starting in 1974, Ceaușescu headed the Romanian Economic Agency in Vienna. He was believed to have been the conduit through whom Nicolae transferred millions of United States dollars into Swiss bank accounts. He was found hanged in the basement of the Romanian Embassy in Vienna, three days after his brother was executed in the Romanian Revolution of December 1989. It was ruled a suicide by police.

Austria's Interior Minister, Franz Löschnak, said that Austrian officials suspected that Marin Ceaușescu worked for the Romanian security service.

He left two daughters, Mihaela (m. Moraru) and Gabriela.
