= Trial and execution of Nicolae and Elena Ceaușescu =

1989 deaths of Romanian leader and his wife

Trial of the Ceaușescus
- Part of the Romanian Revolution
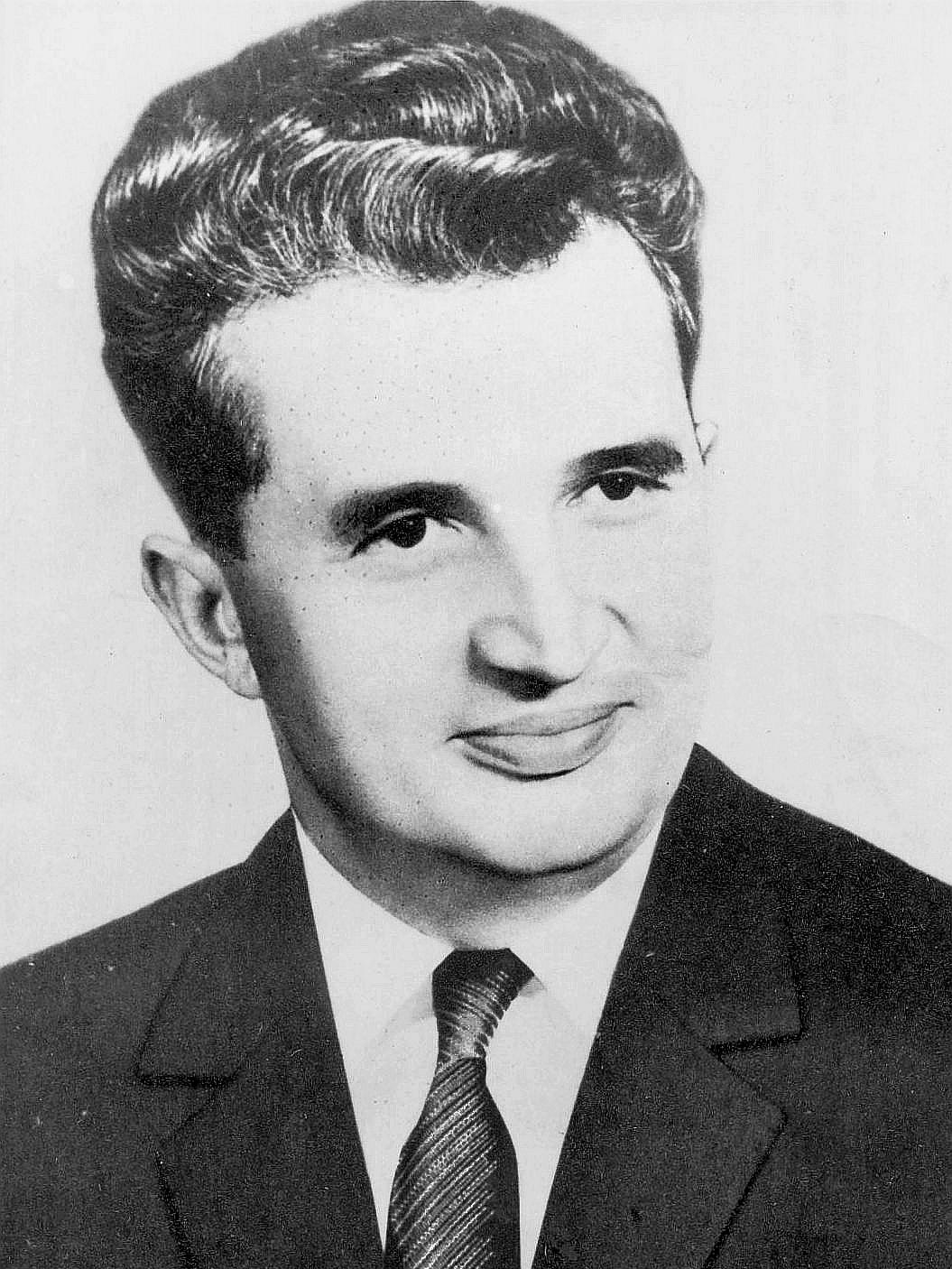
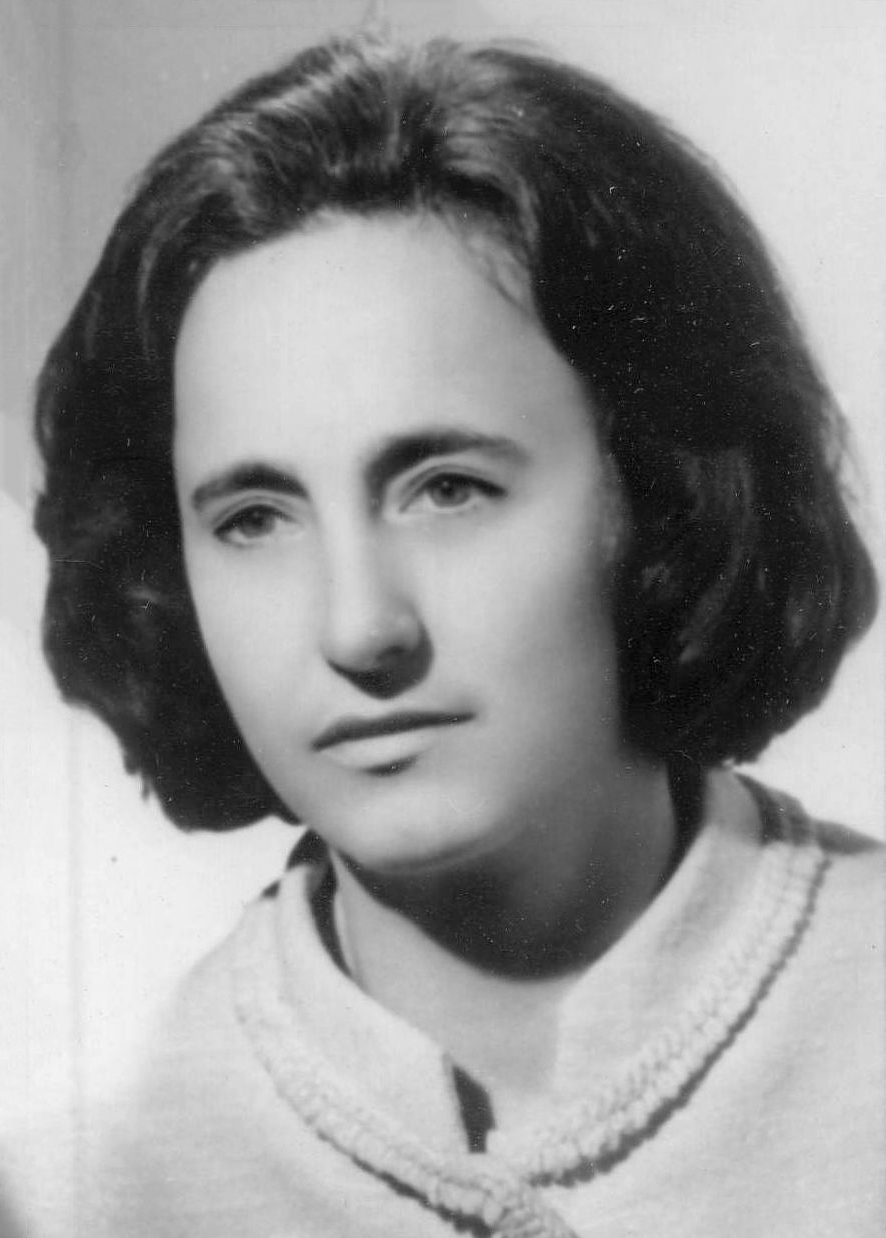
- Nicolae Ceaușescu (left), President of the Socialist Republic of Romania from 1974, also General Secretary of the Romanian Communist Party since 1965, and his wife Elena Ceaușescu (right), were executed following trial on 25 December 1989.
- Date: 25 December 1989
- Convicted: Nicolae Ceaușescu and Elena Ceaușescu
- Charges: Genocide – over 60,000 victims; Subversion of state power by organising armed actions against the people and state power; Destruction of public property by destroying and damaging buildings, explosions in cities, etc.; Undermining the national economy; Attempting to flee the country using over $1 billion deposited in foreign banks
- Sentence: Death

Nicolae Ceaușescu and his wife Elena were executed following trial on 25 December 1989 in Târgoviște, Romania. The trial was conducted by an Extraordinary Military Tribunal, a drumhead court-martial created at the request of a newly formed group called the National Salvation Front. Its outcome was predetermined, and it resulted in guilty verdicts and death sentences for former Romanian President and General Secretary of the Romanian Communist Party Nicolae Ceaușescu, and his wife, Elena Ceaușescu. The main charge was genocide. Romanian state television announced that Nicolae Ceaușescu had been responsible for the deaths of 60,000 people; the announcement did not make clear whether this was the number killed during the Romanian revolution in Timișoara or throughout the 24 years of Ceaușescu's rule.

Nevertheless, the charges did not affect the trial. General Victor Stănculescu had brought with him a specially selected team of paratroopers, handpicked earlier in the morning to act as a firing squad. Before the legal proceedings began, Stănculescu had already selected the spot where the execution would take place: along one side of the wall in the barracks' square.

Nicolae Ceaușescu refused to recognize the tribunal, arguing its lack of constitutional basis and claiming that the revolutionary authorities were part of a Soviet plot. His refusal to recognize the tribunal did not prevent the firing squad from carrying out the sentence immediately, on the same day as the trial.

== Arrest ==
On 22 December 1989, during the Romanian Revolution, Nicolae and Elena Ceaușescu left the Central Committee building in Bucharest by helicopter towards Snagov, from where they left soon afterwards towards Pitești. Vasile Maluțan, the helicopter pilot, claimed to be in danger from anti-aircraft fire, so he landed on the Bucharest–Târgoviște road, near Găești. They stopped a car driven by a Nicolae Decă, who took them to Văcărești, after which he informed the local authorities that the Ceaușescus were going toward Târgoviște. The Ceaușescus took another car and told its driver, Nicolae Petrișor, to drive them to Târgoviște. During the trip, the Ceaușescus heard news of the revolution on the car radio (by then the revolutionaries had taken control of the state media), causing Ceaușescu to angrily denounce the revolution as a coup d'état. Petrișor took the couple to an agricultural centre near Târgoviște, where they were locked in an office and later arrested by soldiers from a local army garrison.

== Creation of the tribunal ==
As the new authorities heard the news of their arrest from General Andrei Kemenici, the commander of the army unit, they began to discuss what to do with the Ceaușescus. Victor Stănculescu, who was Ceaușescu's last defence minister before going over to the revolution, wanted a quick execution, as did Gelu Voican Voiculescu. Ion Iliescu, Romania's provisional president, supported holding a trial first.

During the evening of 24 December 1989, Stănculescu sent the secret code "recourse to the method" to Kemenici, referring to the execution of the Ceaușescus. A ten-member tribunal was formed to try the case. The members of the panel were all military judges.

The Independent characterized the trial as "what can best be described as an egregiously conducted summary trial, at worst a kangaroo court".

== Charges ==
The charges were published in Monitorul Oficial the day after the execution:

- Genocide – over 60,000 victims
- Subversion of state power by organising armed actions against the people and state power.
- Offence of destruction of public property by destroying and damaging buildings, explosions in cities, etc.
- Undermining the national economy.
- Trying to flee the country using over $1 billion deposited in foreign banks.

== Counsel for the defence ==
The morning of the trial, prominent lawyer Nicu Teodorescu was having Christmas breakfast with his family when he was telephoned by an aide to Iliescu, and asked by the National Salvation Front to be the Ceaușescus' defence counsel. He replied that it would be "an interesting challenge". Teodorescu met the couple for the first time in the Târgoviște "court room", when he was given ten minutes to confer with his clients. With so little time to prepare any defence, he tried to explain to them that their best hope of avoiding the death sentence was to plead insanity. The Ceaușescus brushed off the idea; according to Teodorescu, "When I suggested it, Elena in particular said it was an outrageous set-up. They felt deeply insulted...They rejected my help after that."

== Trial ==
Trial of Nicolae and Elena Ceaușescu
- Court: Exceptional Military Tribunal, a drumhead court-martial created at the request of a newly formed group called the National Salvation Front
- Decided: 25 December 1989
- Verdict: Nicolae and Elena Ceaușescu were convicted of all charges and condemned to death
- Charge: The main charge was genocide.

Court membership
- Judge sitting: Victor Stănculescu

At 5:30 a.m. on 25 December, the two were taken by an armoured personnel carrier to the garrison command office where the trial would take place. After the medical visits, they were brought into the improvised courtroom. The trial of Nicolae and Elena Ceaușescu was very brief, lasting approximately one hour. Ceaușescu defended himself by arguing that the tribunal was against the 1965 Constitution of Romania and that only the Great National Assembly had the power to remove him. He argued that it was a coup d'état organized by the Soviets. Ceaușescu completely refused to answer any questions and denied accusations of corruption or mismanagement as President, such as the severe austerity policies leading to food and power shortages, the brutality of the Securitate, destruction of historical cities and villages, and his own lavish lifestyle in villas and palaces.

Nicolae and Elena Ceaușescu were convicted of all charges and condemned to death in what amounted to a show trial. At one point, their forcibly assigned lawyers abandoned their clients' defence and joined with the prosecutor, accusing them of capital crimes instead of defending them. No offer of proof was made for the Ceaușescus' alleged crimes. They were tried based on references, solely by offence-name or hearsay, to criminal acts they had committed in the opinion of prosecutors, or as alleged in press reports. Various irregularities presented themselves, or became apparent after the trial:

- The trial was held immediately, without a prior criminal investigation.
- The suspects could not choose their own lawyers, and their assigned lawyers refused to defend them.
- The court did not attempt to find and prove the truth. There was no file of evidence presented to the court.
- An accusation of genocide was never proven, although four top Ceaușescu aides later admitted complicity in genocide in 1990. Pro TV stated that there were 860 people killed after 22 December 1989 (i.e. when the dictatorial couple was no longer in charge). Another source gives the figure of 306 people killed 17–22 December 1989.
- The Ceaușescus were accused of having $1 billion in Swiss bank accounts. No such accounts have ever been found.
- The judges' verdict allowed for appealing to a higher court. The Ceaușescus were executed a few minutes after the verdict, rendering that provision moot.
- The new authorities argued the execution of the Ceaușescus was necessary to stop terrorists from attacking the new political order. No terrorists or terrorist cells were found to have been active in Romania. A newer insight of prosecution of "crimes against humanity" claims that the new regime orchestrated "a psychosis of terrorism" through diversionary actions.

== Execution ==
The Ceaușescus were executed at 2:50 p.m. local time at Military Unit UM 01417 from Târgoviște on 25 December 1989. The execution was carried out by a firing squad consisting of eight paratroop regiment soldiers brought in by two helicopters from the Boteni base: Captain Ionel Boeru, Sergeant-Major Georghin Octavian and Dorin-Marian Cîrlan, and five other non-commissioned officers who were selected from 20 volunteers. Before the execution, Nicolae Ceaușescu declared, "We could have been shot without having this masquerade!" The Ceaușescus' hands were tied by four soldiers before the execution. Simon Sebag Montefiore wrote that Elena Ceaușescu screamed, "You sons of bitches!" as she was led outside and lined up against the wall, while Nicolae Ceaușescu began singing a fragment of "The Internationale" before the soldiers opened fire. Boeru claimed that Nicolae Ceaușescu also said, "Long Live the Socialist Republic of Romania, independent and free," and Elena Ceaușescu yelled, "You motherfucker!" at a soldier.

The firing squad began shooting as soon as the two were positioned against a wall. The execution happened too quickly for the television crew assigned to the trial and death sentence to videotape it in full; only the last round of shots was filmed. In 2014, retired Captain Boeru told a reporter for The Guardian newspaper that he believes that the shots he fired from his rifle were solely responsible for the deaths of both of the Ceaușescus, because, of the three soldiers in the firing squad, he was the only one who remembered to switch his assault rifle to fire fully automatic, and at least one member of the group hesitated to shoot for several seconds. In 1990, a member of the National Salvation Front reported that 120 bullets were found in the couple's bodies.

In 1989, Prime Minister Petre Roman told French television that the execution was carried out quickly due to rumours that loyalists would attempt to rescue the couple.

== Burial ==
After the execution, the bodies were covered with canvas. The Ceaușescus' corpses were taken to Bucharest and buried in Ghencea Cemetery on 30 December 1989.

The bodies were exhumed for identification and reburied in 2010. Groups of Ceaușescu's supporters visit to place flowers on the grave, with large numbers of pensioners gathering on 26 January, Nicolae's birthday.

== Release of the images ==
The hasty trial and the images of the dead Ceaușescus were videotaped and the footage promptly released in numerous Western countries two days after the execution. Later that day, it was also shown on Romanian television.

== Reactions ==
In 2009 Valentin Ceaușescu, elder son of the Ceaușescus, argued that the revolutionary forces should have killed his parents when they had arrested them on 22 December since they did not need any trial. After making vague comments about the incident, Ion Iliescu stated that it was "quite shameful, but necessary". In a similar vein, Stănculescu told the BBC in 2009 that the trial was "not just, but it was necessary" because the alternative would have been seeing Nicolae lynched on the streets of Bucharest.

Several countries criticized the new rulers of Romania after the execution due to lack of public trial. The United States government was the most prominent critic of the trial, stating: "We regret the trial did not take place in an open and public fashion."

== Aftermath ==
On 1 March 1990, Colonel Gică Popa, who had presided over the trial and been promoted to general, was found dead in his office. His death was ruled a suicide. The Ceaușescus were the last people to be executed in Romania before the abolition of capital punishment on 7 January 1990.

In December 2018, Iliescu, former Deputy Prime Minister Gelu Voican Voiculescu, former Romanian Air Force chief Iosif Rus, and former National Salvation Front council member Emil Dumitrescu were indicted by Romanian military prosecutors for crimes against humanity for the deaths that occurred during the Romanian Revolution, most of which took place after Ceaușescu was overthrown. The indictment also made reference to the conviction and execution of the Ceaușescus "after a mockery of a trial". The investigation that led to the indictments had previously been closed in 2009, but was re-opened in 2016 as the result of a trial at the European Court of Human Rights.

== In the arts ==
Swiss theatre director Milo Rau and his International Institute of Political Murder (IIPM) wrote and produced the stage production The Last Days of the Ceausescus in 2009. The production was a re-enactment of the trial, and IIPM was able to obtain testimonies from people directly involved in the Romanian revolution (including dissidents, politicians, revolutionaries and ordinary Romanians) and the trial of the Ceaușescus (including the general who betrayed them, the officer who captured them, and the soldier who shot them).

A few days before the premiere at the Odeon Theatre in Bucharest in 2010, Nicolae and Elena Ceaușescu's son-in-law Mircea Oprean (the widower of Zoia, who died in 2006), forced his way into rehearsals, saying that he and his brother-in-law Valentin Ceaușescu had registered the name "Ceaușescu" as a trademark in 2008, and it could not be used in the title. A lawsuit followed, and the director was forced to cancel the show after two performances.

The show then premiered at Hebbel am Ufer (HAU) in Berlin, before touring Switzerland at the Schlachthaus Theater in Bern, Theaterhaus Gessnerallee in Zurich, and Südpol in Lucerne. It was also later produced at the Festival d'Avignon in France, and a documentary film (Die letzten Tage der Ceausescus) was made about it.

== See also ==
- List of heads of state and government who were sentenced to death
