= Elena Ceaușescu =

Wife of Nicolae Ceaușescu (1919–1989)

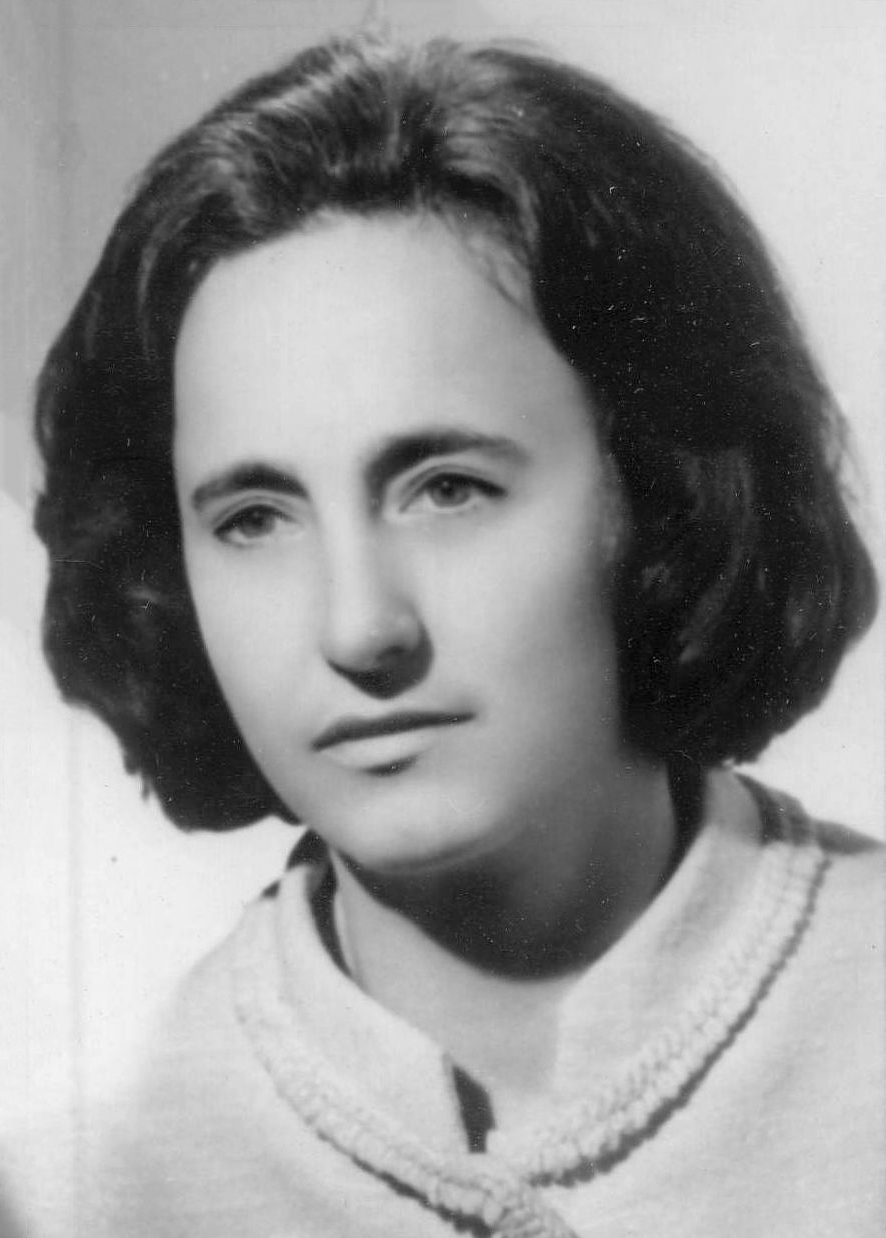
- Portrait of Elena c. 1940–50s

First Deputy Prime Minister of Romania
- In office 29 March 1980 – 25 December 1989
- President: Nicolae Ceaușescu
- Prime Minister: Ilie Verdeț; Constantin Dăscălescu
- Preceded by: Gheorghe Oprea
- Succeeded by: Mihai Drăgănescu

President of the Council of National Science and Technology
- In office 8 April 1980 – 22 December 1989
- Prime Minister: Ilie Verdeț; Constantin Dăscălescu
- Preceded by: Ioan Ursu
- Succeeded by: Office abolished

Personal details
- Born: Lenuța Petrescu; 20 January 1919 Petrești, Romania
- Died: 25 December 1989 (aged 70) Târgoviște, Romania
- Cause of death: Execution by firing squad
- Resting place: Ghencea Cemetery, Bucharest
- Party: Romanian Communist Party
- Spouse: Nicolae Ceaușescu (m. 1947)
- Children: Valentin; Zoia; Nicu
- Education: Politehnica University of Bucharest
- Criminal conviction
- Criminal information
- Conviction: Genocide
- Trial: Trial and execution of Nicolae and Elena Ceaușescu
- Penalty: Death

Details
- Victims: Romanian dissidents

Elena Ceaușescu (Note: English: /tʃaʊˈʃɛskuː/ chow-SHESK-oo, Romanian: [eˈlena tʃe̯a.uˈʃesku].) (born Lenuța Petrescu; 20 January [O.S. 7 January] 1919 – 25 December 1989) was a Romanian politician and doctor of chemistry who was the wife of Nicolae Ceaușescu, General Secretary of the Romanian Communist Party and leader of the Socialist Republic of Romania. She was also the Deputy Prime Minister of Romania. Following the Romanian Revolution in 1989, she was executed alongside her husband on 25 December.

== Background ==
She was born Lenuța Petrescu into a peasant family in Petrești commune, Dâmbovița County, in the historical region of Wallachia. Her father worked as a ploughman. She was able to acquire only an elementary school level education. After elementary school, she moved along with her brother to Bucharest, where she worked as a laboratory assistant before finding employment in a textile factory.

She joined the Bucharest branch of the Romanian Communist Party as a textile factory worker in 1939, and met 21-year-old Nicolae Ceaușescu. Ceaușescu was so instantly and strongly attracted to her that, reportedly, he never looked at another woman romantically. They married in December 1947. She obtained a degree in chemical engineering in 1957 and a doctorate in 1967, though there is anecdotal evidence that her thesis was written by a university professor since she had only a rudimentary knowledge of the discipline.

== Career in government ==
After the Communists took power, Elena Ceaușescu worked as a secretary in the Ministry of Foreign Affairs and was an unimportant figure until her husband became Communist Party General Secretary.

Elena Ceaușescu frequently accompanied her husband on official visits abroad. During a state visit to China in June 1971, she took note of how Jiang Qing, Chairman Mao Zedong's wife, maintained a position of power. Most likely inspired by this, she began to engineer her own political rise in Romania. In July 1971, after a mini-cultural revolution launched by her husband, she was elected a member of the Central Commission on Socio-Economic Forecasting. Starting in July 1972, Elena Ceaușescu started getting various offices at senior levels in the Romanian Communist Party. In July 1972, she became a full member of the Romanian Communist Party Central Committee. In June 1973, she became a member of the Politburo of the Romanian Communist Party, becoming the second most important and influential person after her husband. She was deeply involved in party administration alongside her husband, and was one of the few spouses of a Communist Party leader to have a high political profile of her own. In June 1973, after having been nominated by Emil Bodnăraș, she was elected to the party's executive committee. In November 1974, at the 11th Party Congress, she was made a member of the (renamed) political executive committee, and in January 1977, she became a member of the highest party body, the Permanent Bureau of the Political Executive Committee. In March 1975, she was elected to the Great National Assembly, the country's national legislature, holding the seat for Pitești, Argeș County, the most important industrial region of the country, until her death in 1989. In March 1980, she was made a First Deputy Prime Minister, a state title she held until she was executed in the Romanian Revolution.

From the early 1980s onward, Elena was the object of a cult of personality as intense as that of her husband, which exalted her as the "Mother of the Nation". As she was led out of the courtroom before her execution she was recorded chastising the soldiers binding her hands with the words, "Shame on you. I brought you up as a mother. I raised you." By all accounts, her vanity and desire for honours exceeded that of her husband. As with her husband, Romanian state television was under strict orders to take great care portraying her on screen. For instance, she was never supposed to be shown in profile because of her large nose and overall homely appearance.

== Fall from power ==
Ceaușescu fled with her husband on 22 December 1989, after the events in Timișoara led to the Romanian Revolution, but she and her husband were captured in the town of Târgoviște. At the show trial that took place, she answered only a few questions since her husband took a protective role, asked her to calm down, and shook his head each time her mouth opened to reply in anger.

=== Execution ===
On the afternoon of 25 December 1989 in Târgoviște, they were turned over to a firing squad and executed. Her arms, and those of her husband, were tied behind their backs. Their actual execution happened so quickly that a military journalist videoing the trial captured only the last round of bullets and the crumpled bodies on the floor. The aftermath, including echoes of the final volley, the pall of smoke, and the bodies immediately afterward, were also caught on camera. She was the only woman ever executed by the modern state of Romania.

Ceaușescu was outlived by her mother, a near centenarian at the time of her death, her brother Gheorghe Petrescu (also an important figure in the party) and her three children: Valentin (born 1948), Zoia (1949–2006) and Nicu (1951–1996). Nicu was an important member of the Romanian Communist Party, unlike his siblings. Elena Ceaușescu is buried in Ghencea Cemetery.

== Reputation as a chemistry researcher ==
After graduating from primary school in her village and moving to Bucharest, Ceaușescu continued her education in the 1950s through night courses at the local Polytechnic, obtaining a bachelor's degree in chemistry. Later in 1967, she was promoted as a scientist, and was also awarded a PhD in chemistry.

Since the Revolutions of 1989, several scientists have claimed that Ceaușescu had forced them to write papers in her name, and that the university gave her the honour of the doctorate solely because of her political position.

According to a 1984 report by Radio Free Europe: "It is rumoured that, at the time when she wanted to receive her doctorate from the Bucharest Faculty of Chemistry, she met with strong opposition from the Romanian chemist Costin Nenițescu, the Dean of the faculty. She was forced instead to present her thesis to Cristofor I. Simionescu and Ioan Ursu at the University of Iași, where she met with complete success." The dissertation is titled the "Stereospecific Polymerization of Isoprene" and has substantial scientific value, still cited today. Elena Ceausescu went to school only up to 4th grade, which she failed, and thus it is implausible for her to have written the dissertation in 1967. The real authors remain anonymous, but indirect evidence points to a group of Romanian chemists led by Dr. Ozias Solomon; professor Solomon was a renowned chemist and he had been forced to publish with Elena Ceaușescu.

She was sometimes nicknamed Codoi, referring to her alleged mispronunciation of the name of the chemical compound CO_{2} (C for carbon, O for oxygen, and "doi" being Romanian for "two"). She was mocked by many, including an official who called her by this nickname during her show trial.

In 1957, she was hired as a research scientist at ICECHIM (National Institute for Chemical Research). In the early 1960s, she was reported to be secretary of the party committee of the Bucharest Central Institute of Chemical Researches, and when her husband took over the party leadership in March 1965, she was listed as the institute's director. In December of the same year, she was elected a member of the newly established National Council of Scientific Research, and in September 1966, she was awarded the Order of Scientific Merit First Class. In March 1974, she was made a member of the Romanian Academy's Section for Chemical Sciences. Ceaușescu was given many honorary awards for scientific achievement in the field of polymer chemistry during the period when her husband ruled Romania. She is named as co-inventor on a number of patents, but many scientists claim she forced them to share credit on the patents.

A group of Romanian scientists are trying to revoke Ceaușescu's scientific credentials and argue that her work is still being cited in modern, genuine scientific papers and influences current research despite Ceaușescu reportedly being "barely literate in science". In 1978, during Nicolae Ceaușescu's state visit to the United Kingdom, the Royal Institute of Chemistry admitted Elena Ceaușescu into membership as a Fellow. The Royal Society of Chemistry, the Royal Institute's successor later clarified that Ceaușescu's membership had been revoked during the Romanian Revolution of 1989. Also, patents under her name are still kept by the European Patent Office.

== Honours ==
- Iran: Commemorative Medal of the 2500th Anniversary of the founding of the Persian Empire (14 October 1971).
- Italy: Dame Grand Cross of the Order of Merit of the Italian Republic (21 May 1973).
- National Reorganization Process: Dame Grand Cross of the Order of the Liberator General San Martín (5 March 1974).
- Portugal: Dame Grand Collar of the Order of Prince Henry (12 June 1975).
- Philippines: Order of Gabriela Silang (9 April 1975).
- Malaysia: Honorary Grand Commander of the Order of the Defender of the Realm (1984)

=== Honorary degree and professorship ===
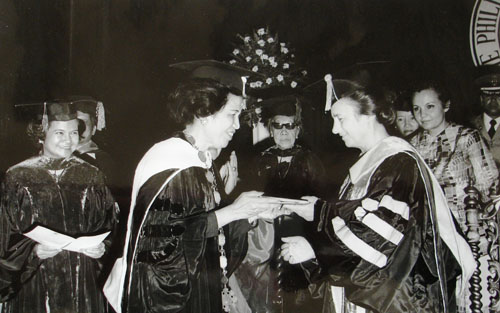
Elena Ceaușescu receiving an honorary doctorate in Manila, 1975

Elena Ceaușescu was an Honorary Doctor of several universities and was a member of some academic societies in the United States and countries in Asia, Europe, and Africa.

- Member of the New York Academy of Sciences (United States, 1973)
- Corresponding member of the Academy of Athens (Greece, 1976)
- Honorary doctor causa of the University of Buenos Aires (Argentina, 1974)
- Honorary doctor causa of Universidad Nacional del Sur (Bahia Blanca, Argentina, 1974)
- Honorary doctorate degree honoris causa – Philippine Women's University (1975)
- Honorary doctor of Universidad Autónoma de Yucatán (Mexico, 1975)
- Honorary doctor of the University of Tehran (Iran, 1975)
- Honorary member of the International Society of Industrial Chemistry (1970)
- Honorary professor at the National University of Engineering (Lima, Peru, 1973)
- Honorary member of the American Institute of Chemists (Washington, D.C., 1973)
- Honorary member of the College of Chemists and Chemical Engineers of Costa Rica (San Jose, 1973)
- Honorary member of the Council of the Central University of Ecuador and of the Institute of Natural Sciences of the Central University of Ecuador (Quito, 1973),
- Honorary member of the Mexican Chemical Society (1975)
- Honorary doctor causa at the University of Manila (1975)
- Honorary member of the Ghana Academy of Arts and Sciences (1977)
- Honorary professor of the Polytechnic of Central London (1978)

== Publications ==
- Research work on synthesis and characterization of macromolecular compounds, Editura Academiei Republicii Socialiste România, 1974
- Stereospecific Polymerization of Isoprene, 1982
- Nouvelles recherches dans le domaine des composés macromoleculaires, 1984
- Dostizheniia v khimii i tekhnologii polimerov, 1988

== Bibliography ==
- John Sweeney. The Life and Evil Times of Nicolae Ceauşescu. 1991
- Edward Behr. Kiss The Hand You Cannot Bite, 1991. ISBN 0-679-40128-8
