= Ilie Ceaușescu =

Romanian army general and communist politician

Ilie Ceaușescu

Ilie Ceaușescu (8 June 1926 – 1 October 2002) was a Romanian army general and communist politician who was Deputy Defence Minister of Communist Romania during the rule of his older brother, Nicolae Ceaușescu.

Ilie's military and political career was helped by Nicolae; between 1980 and 1989, he was a member of the Central Committee of the Romanian Communist Party, and, in 1982-1989, he was Deputy Minister of Defense.

Ilie Ceaușescu was also a historian, and he influenced Nicolae in establishing protochronism as Romania's official historiography and an important part of the national propaganda system. For instance, he claimed that the Romanian people have been always the same since time immemorial, being very little influenced by other peoples (Romans, Slavs, Mongols) etc.:

It is well known that the Romanian people remained always the same, consolidated, unitary and homogeneous in the hearth it had always occupied.

After the Romanian Revolution and the execution of Nicolae Ceaușescu, in 1990 it was claimed that both Ilie and Marin Ceaușescu were involved in a series of transactions between the United States and Romania, which consisted of selling Soviet military technology. The deal was allegedly worth $40 million, part of which was allegedly deposited in Swiss bank accounts. However, Ilie Ceaușescu rejected that.

He retired from public life after the revolution, and died 13 years later at the age of 76.

== Works ==
=== English ===
- The entire people's war for the homeland's defence with the Romanians: From times of yore to present days, Military Publishing House, Bucharest, 1980
- Transylvania, an ancient Romanian land, Military Publishing House, Bucharest, 1983
- 23 August 1944: 200 days spared from World War II, Editura Științifică și Enciclopedică, 1984
- From the Dacian state to socialist Romania: 2,000 years of statehood, Military Publishing House, Bucharest, 1985
- A Turning Point in World War II, East European Monographs, Boulder, 1985 ISBN 0-88033-084-8
- Independence - a fundamental aim of the Romanian people: Traditions, present features, prospects Military Publishing House, Bucharest, 1987
- Romanian Military Doctrine, East European Monographs, Boulder, 1988 ISBN 0-88033-135-6

=== Romanian ===
- Transilvania: Străvechi pamînt românesc, Ed. Militară, Bucharest, 1984 (with Florin Constantiniu and Mihail E. Ionescu)
- Mobilitate socială, Ed. Academiei, Bucharest, 1973
