= Nicolae Ceaușescu =

Leader of Romania from 1965 to 1989

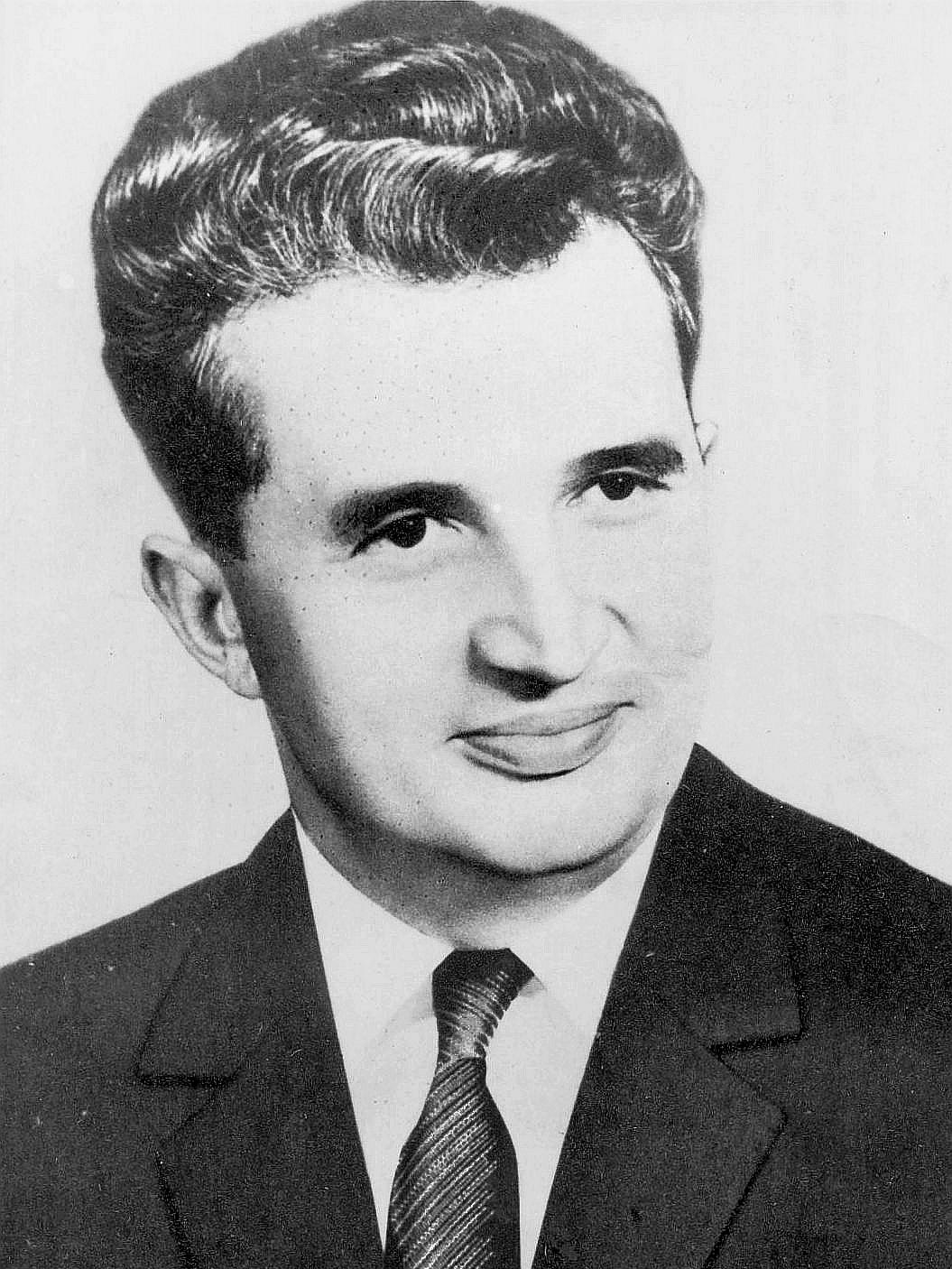
- Official portrait, 1965

General Secretary of the Romanian Communist Party
- In office 22 March 1965 – 22 December 1989
- Preceded by: Gheorghe Gheorghiu-Dej
- Succeeded by: Position abolished

President of the Socialist Republic of Romania
- In office 28 March 1974 – 22 December 1989
- Prime Minister: Manea Mănescu; Ilie Verdeț; Constantin Dăscălescu
- Preceded by: Position established
- Succeeded by: National Salvation Front Council (interim); Ion Iliescu (as President of Romania)

President of the State Council
- In office 9 December 1967 – 28 March 1974
- Prime Minister: Ion Gheorghe Maurer; Manea Mănescu
- Preceded by: Chivu Stoica
- Succeeded by: Office transformed

Personal details
- Born: 8 February 1918 Scornicești, Romania
- Died: 25 December 1989 (aged 71) Târgoviște, Romania
- Cause of death: Executed by firing squad
- Resting place: Ghencea Cemetery, Bucharest, Romania
- Party: Romanian Communist Party (from 1932)
- Spouse: Lenuța Petrescu (m. 1947)
- Children: Nicu; Valentin; Zoia
- Relatives: Ceaușescu family
- Criminal information
- Height: 1.68 m (5 ft 6 in)
- Status: Executed
- Conviction: Genocide
- Penalty: Death by firing squad

Details
- Victims: Romanian dissidents
- Date apprehended: 25 December 1989
- Ceaușescu's voice Nicolae Ceaușescu talking about capitalism. Recorded 1989
- De facto leader of the RPR/RSR: ← Gheorghiu-Dej; Iliescu →

Nicolae Ceaușescu (Note: English: /tʃaʊˈʃɛskuː/ chow-SHESK-oo, Romanian: [nikoˈla.e tʃe̯a.uˈʃesku].) (8 February [O.S. 26 January] 1918 – 25 December 1989) was a Romanian politician who was the second and last leader of Communist Romania as general secretary of the Romanian Communist Party from 1965 until his overthrow and execution in 1989. He was also the country's head of state from 1967 to 1989, serving as President of the State Council from 1967 to 1974 and as President of the Republic from 1974 until 1989.

Born in Scornicești, Ceaușescu joined the Romanian Communist Party in his teens and was repeatedly imprisoned under the pre-war and wartime regimes for his communist activism. After World War II, he rose through the party ranks under Gheorghe Gheorghiu-Dej, the country’s leader, whom he succeeded as general secretary.

Upon taking power, Ceaușescu eased press censorship and condemned the Warsaw Pact invasion of Czechoslovakia in his speech of 21 August 1968, which resulted in a surge in popularity. However, this period of liberalisation was brief, as his regime soon became more rigid. It was widely considered to be one of the most repressive states in the Eastern Bloc. His secret police, the Securitate, was responsible for mass surveillance as well as severe repression within the country, and controlled the media and press. Ceaușescu's attempts to implement policies that would lead to a significant growth of the population led to a growing number of illegal abortions and increased the number of orphans in state institutions. Economic mismanagement due to failed oil ventures during the 1970s led to the accumulation of significant foreign debts. His efforts to repay the debts through austerity were effective, but extremely unpopular. His cult of personality experienced unprecedented elevation, followed by the deterioration of foreign relations, even with the Soviet Union.

By the end of 1989, mounting discontent over the state of the nation and Ceaușescu’s rule erupted into the Romanian revolution. Ceaușescu perceived the demonstrations in Timișoara as a threat and ordered military forces to open fire on 17 December, causing many deaths and injuries. The demonstrations reached the capital Bucharest, forcing Ceaușescu and his wife Elena to flee in a helicopter, but they were soon captured after the armed forces turned on them. After being convicted of economic sabotage and genocide in a show trial, both were sentenced to death and executed by firing squad on 25 December, ending 42 years of Communist rule. 21st-century polling has indicated that many Romanians retain admiration for Ceaușescu; a 2018 poll found that 64% of Romanians had a positive opinion of his rule.

== Early life ==
Ceaușescu was born in the small village of Scornicești during the period of the Kingdom of Romania, being the third of nine children of a poor peasant family (see Ceaușescu family). Based on his birth certificate, he was born on 5 February [O.S. 23 January] 1918, rather than the official 8 February [O.S. 26 January] 1918—his birth was registered with a three-day delay, which later led to confusion. According to the information recorded in his autobiography, Nicolae Ceaușescu was born on 26 January 1918. His father Andruță (1886–1969) owned 3 hectares (7.4 acres) of agricultural land and a few sheep, and Nicolae supplemented his large family's income through tailoring. He studied at the village school until the age of 11, when he left for Bucharest. The Olt County Service of National Archives holds excerpts from the catalogs of Scornicești Primary School, which certifies that Nicolae A. Ceaușescu passed the first grade with an average of 8.26 and the second grade with an average of 8.18, ranking third, in a class in which 25 students were enrolled. Journalist Cătălin Gruia claimed in 2007 that he ran away from his supposedly extremely religious, abusive and strict father. He initially lived with his sister, Niculina Rusescu.

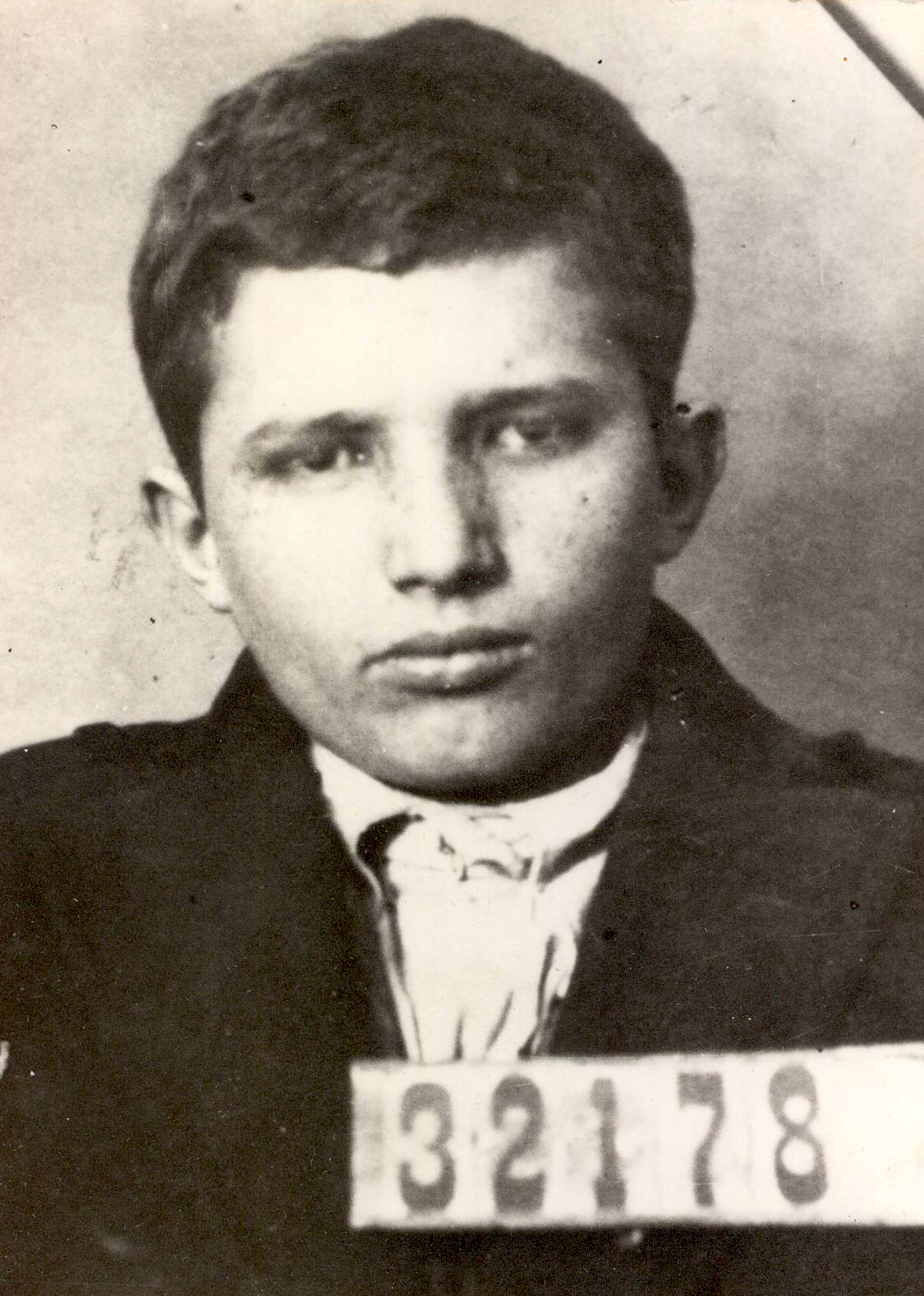
Ceaușescu, at age 15, detained at Doftana prison, 1933

He became an apprentice shoemaker, working in the workshop of Alexandru Săndulescu, a shoemaker who was an active member in the then-illegal Communist Party. Ceaușescu was soon involved in Communist Party activities (becoming a member in early 1932), but as a teenager he was given only small tasks. He was first arrested in 1933, at the age of 15, for street fighting during a strike and again, in 1934, first for collecting signatures on a petition protesting against the trial of railway workers and twice more for other similar activities. By the mid-1930s, he had been in missions in Bucharest, Craiova, Câmpulung and Râmnicu Vâlcea, being arrested several times.

The profile from the secret police, Siguranța Statului, named him "a dangerous Communist agitator" and "distributor of Communist and antifascist propaganda materials". For these charges, he was convicted on 6 June 1936 by the Brașov Tribunal to two years in prison, an additional six months for contempt of court, and one year of forced residence in Scornicești. He spent most of his sentence in Doftana Prison. While out of jail in 1939, he met Lenuța Petrescu, whom he married in 1947 and who would play an increasing role in his political life over the years.

Soon after being freed, he was arrested again and sentenced for "conspiracy against social order", spending the time during the war in prisons and internment camps: Jilava (1940), Caransebeș (1942), Văcărești (1943), and Târgu Jiu (1943).

In 1943, he was transferred to Târgu Jiu internment camp, where he shared a cell with Gheorghe Gheorghiu-Dej, becoming his protégé.

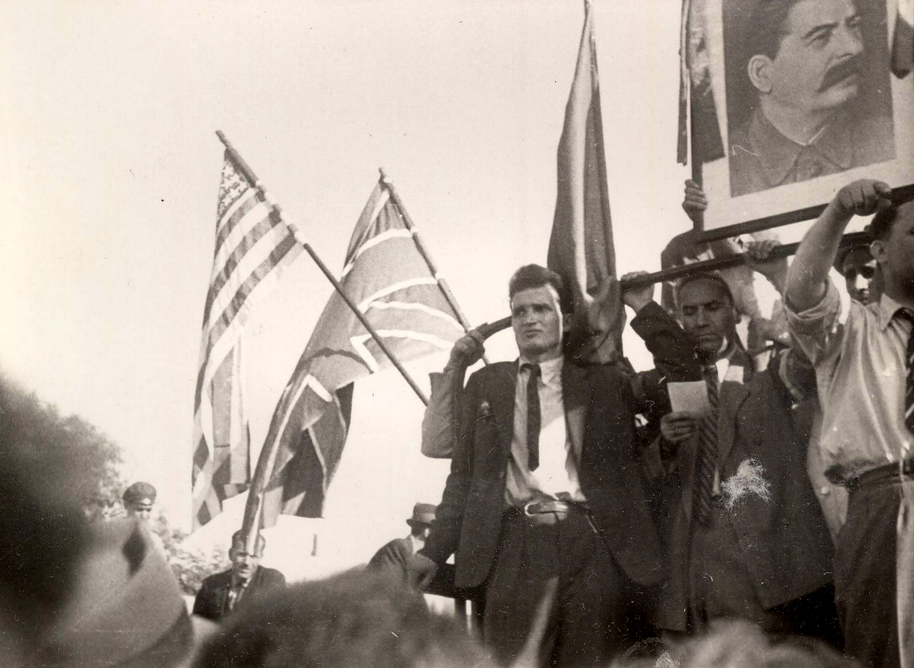
Ceaușescu and other Communists at a public meeting in Colentina, welcoming the Red Army as it entered Bucharest on 30 August 1944

Enticed with substantial bribes, the camp authorities gave the Communist prisoners much freedom in running their cell block, provided they did not attempt to break out of prison. At Târgu Jiu, Gheorghiu-Dej ran "self-criticism sessions" where various Party members had to confess before the other Party members to misunderstanding the teachings of Karl Marx, Friedrich Engels, Vladimir Lenin, and Joseph Stalin as interpreted by Gheorghiu-Dej; journalist Edward Behr claimed that Ceaușescu's role in these "self-criticism sessions" was that of the enforcer, the young man allegedly beating those Party members who refused to go with or were insufficiently enthusiastic about the "self-criticism" sessions. These "self-criticism sessions" not only helped to cement Gheorghiu-Dej's control over the Party, but also endeared his protégé Ceaușescu to him. It was Ceaușescu's time at Târgu Jiu that marked the beginning of his rise to power. After World War II, when Romania was beginning to fall under Soviet influence, Ceaușescu served as secretary of the Union of Communist Youth (1944–1945).

After the Communists seized power in Romania in 1947, and under the patronage of Gheorghiu-Dej, Ceaușescu was elected a member of the Great National Assembly, the new legislative body of communist Romania.

In May 1948, Ceaușescu was appointed Secretary of the Ministry of Agriculture, and in March 1949 he was promoted to the position of Deputy Minister. From the Ministry of Agriculture and with no military experience, he was made Deputy Minister in charge of the armed forces, holding the rank of Major General. Later, promoted to the rank of lieutenant general, he became First Deputy to the defence ministry and head of the Army's Higher Political Directorate.

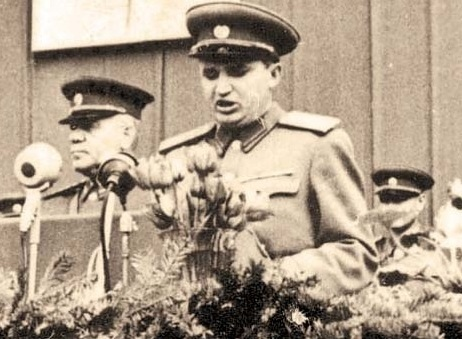
Ceaușescu giving a speech in 1954

In 1952, Gheorghiu-Dej brought him onto the Central Committee months after the party's "Muscovite faction" led by Ana Pauker had been purged. In the late 1940s-early 1950s, the Party had been divided into the "home communists" headed by Gheorghiu-Dej who remained inside Romania prior to 1944 and the "Muscovites" who had gone into exile in the Soviet Union. With the partial exception of Poland, where the Polish October crisis of 1956 brought to power the previously imprisoned "home communist" Władysław Gomułka, Romania was the only Eastern European nation where the "home communists" triumphed over the "Muscovites". In the rest of the Soviet bloc, there were a series of purges in this period that led to the "home communists" being executed or imprisoned. Like his patron Gheorghiu-Dej, Ceaușescu was a "home communist" who benefited from the fall of the "Muscovites" in 1952. In 1954, Ceaușescu became a full member of the Politburo, effectively granting him one of the highest positions of power in the country.

=== Role in the collectivisation process ===
A high-ranking official in the agricultural and defence ministries, Ceaușescu had an important role in the forced collectivisation; according to the Romanian Workers' Party's own data, between 1949 and 1952 there were over 80,000 arrests of peasants, with 30,000 receiving prison sentences. One example of these arrests is the uprising of Vadu Roșca (Vrancea county), which opposed the state programme of expropriation of private holdings, where military units opened fire on the rebelling peasants, killing 9 and wounding 48. Ceaușescu personally led the investigation which resulted in 18 peasants being imprisoned for "rebellion" and "conspiring against social order".

== Leadership of Romania ==
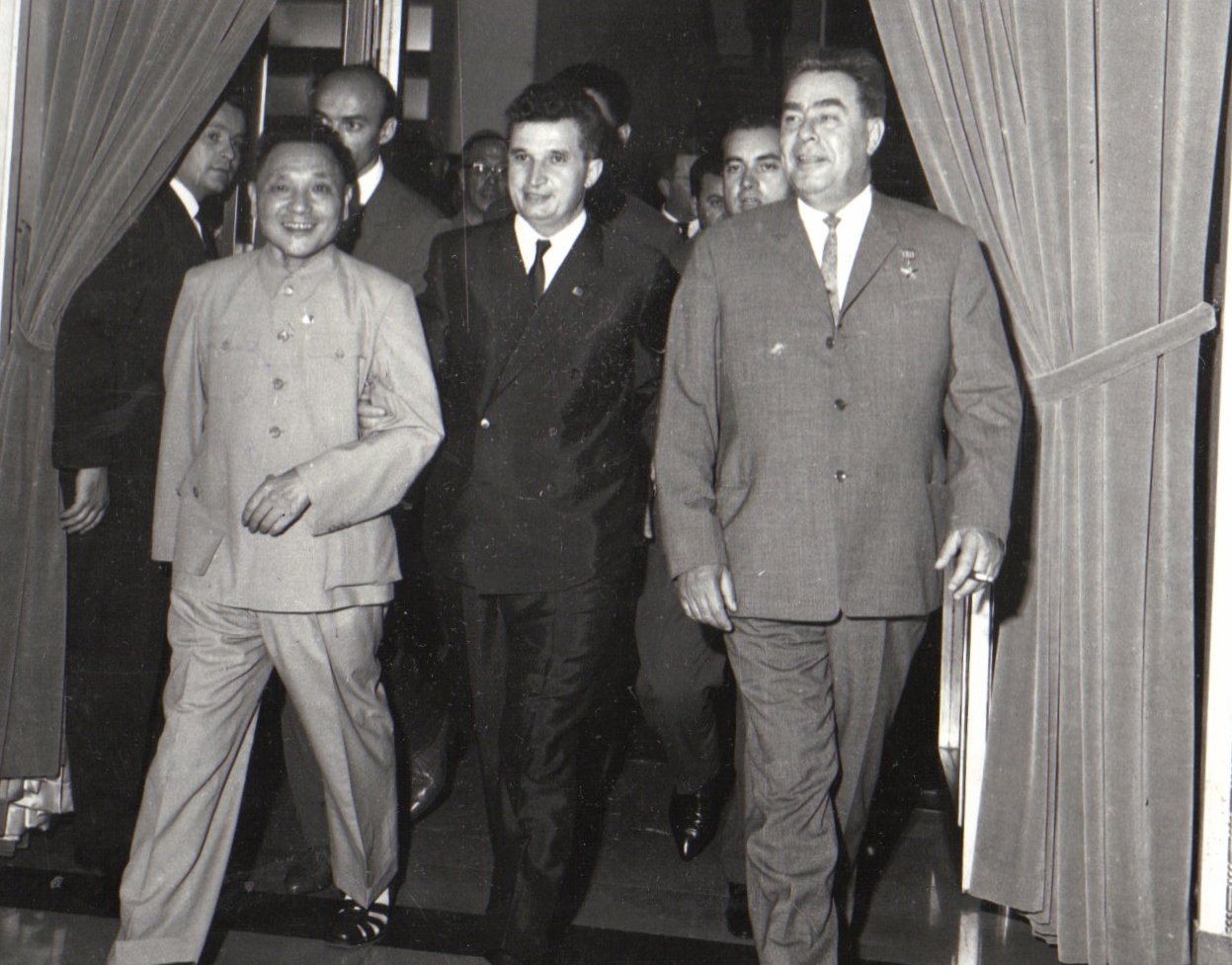
Ceaușescu with Deng Xiaoping and Leonid Brezhnev in 1965

When Gheorghiu-Dej died on 19 March 1965, Ceaușescu was not the obvious successor, despite his closeness to the longtime leader. However, widespread infighting by older and more connected officials led the Politburo to choose Ceaușescu as a compromise candidate. He was elected general secretary on 22 March 1965, three days after Gheorghiu-Dej's death.

One of Ceaușescu’s first major acts after becoming general secretary in March 1965 was to restore the party’s historical name, changing it from the Romanian Workers’ Party back to the Communist Party of Romania at the party’s ninth congress later that year. Later that year, a new constitution—adopted by the Great National Assembly in August 1965—renamed the country the Socialist Republic of Romania, replacing the former designation of "Romanian People’s Republic". In December 1967, Ceaușescu consolidated his power when he became President of the State Council, thereby assuming the role of head of state. His regime maintained strict political control, and thousands of dissenters were imprisoned or, in some cases, confined in psychiatric institutions.

Initially, Ceaușescu became a popular figure, both in Romania and in the West, because of his independent foreign policy, which challenged the authority of the Soviet Union. In the 1960s, he eased press censorship and ended Romania's active participation in the Warsaw Pact, but Romania formally remained a member. He refused to take part in the 1968 invasion of Czechoslovakia by Warsaw Pact forces and even actively and openly condemned it in his 21 August 1968 speech. He travelled to Prague a week before the invasion to offer moral support to his Czechoslovak counterpart, Alexander Dubček. Although the Soviet Union largely tolerated Ceaușescu's recalcitrance, his seeming independence from Moscow earned Romania maverick status within the Eastern Bloc.

All of Ceaușescu's economic, foreign, and demographic policies were meant to achieve his ultimate goal: turning Romania into one of the world's great powers.

During the following years, Ceaușescu pursued an open policy towards the United States and Western Europe. Romania was the first Warsaw Pact country to recognise West Germany, the first to join the International Monetary Fund, and the first to receive a US president, Richard Nixon. In 1971, Romania became a member of the General Agreement on Tariffs and Trade. Romania and Yugoslavia were also the only Eastern European countries that entered into trade agreements with the European Economic Community before the fall of the Eastern Bloc.

A series of official visits to Western countries (including the US, France, the United Kingdom, Spain and Australia) helped Ceaușescu to present himself as a reforming Communist, pursuing an independent foreign policy within the Soviet Bloc. He also became eager to be seen as an enlightened international statesman, able to mediate in international conflicts, and to gain international respect for Romania. Ceaușescu negotiated in international affairs, such as the opening of US relations with China in 1969 and the visit of Egyptian president Anwar Sadat to Israel in 1977. In addition, Romania was the only country in the world to maintain normal diplomatic relations with both Israel and the Palestine Liberation Organisation. In 1980, Romania participated in the 1980 Summer Olympics in Moscow with its other Soviet bloc allies, but in 1984 was one of the few Communist countries to participate in the 1984 Summer Olympics in Los Angeles (going on to win 53 medals, trailing only the US and West Germany in the overall count) while most of the Eastern Bloc's nations boycotted this event.

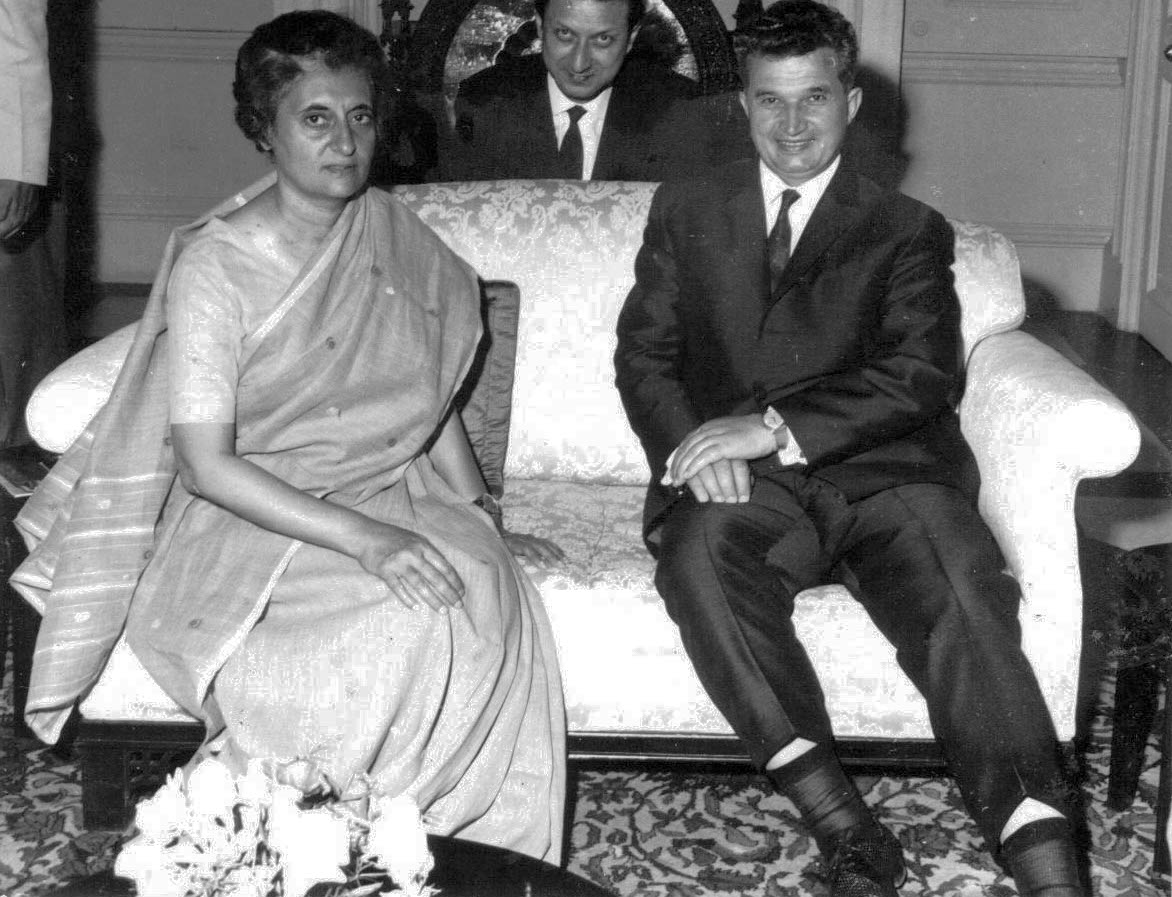
Ceaușescu with Indira Gandhi during his visit to India in 1969

Ceaușescu refused to implement measures of economic liberalism. The evolution of his regime followed the path begun by Gheorghiu-Dej. He continued with the programme of intensive industrialisation aimed at the economic self-sufficiency of the country, which since 1959 had already doubled industrial production and had reduced the peasant population from 78% at the end of the 1940s to 61% in 1966 and 49% by 1971. However, for Romania, like other Eastern People's Republics, industrialisation did not mean a total social break with the countryside. The peasants returned periodically to the villages or resided in them, commuting daily to the city in a practice called naveta. This allowed Romanians to act as peasants and workers at the same time.

Universities were also founded in smaller Romanian towns, which served to train qualified professionals such as engineers, economists, planners or jurists necessary for the development projects of the country. Romanian healthcare also achieved improvements and recognition by the World Health Organization (WHO), whose director general Marcolino Candau visited Romania in May 1969 and declared that the visits of WHO staff to various Romanian hospitals had left an extraordinarily good impression.

The social and economic transformations resulted in improved living conditions for Romanians. Economic growth allowed for higher salaries which, combined with the benefits offered by the state (free medical care, pensions, free universal education at all levels, etc.) were a leap compared to the pre-WWII situation of the Romanian population. Certain extra payments were allowed for the peasants, who started to produce more.

=== Decree 770 ===
In October 1966, in an attempt to reverse Romania's low birth and fertility rates, Ceaușescu issued Decree 770 to restrict abortion and contraception. The government targeted rising divorce rates and made divorce more difficult – marriages could only be dissolved in exceptional cases. By the late 1960s, the population began to swell. In turn, a new problem was created, child abandonment, which swelled the orphanage population (see 1980s–1990s Romanian orphans phenomenon). Many of the children in these orphanages suffered mental and physical deficiencies (see Cighid).

Measures to encourage reproduction included financial motivations for families who bore children, guaranteed maternity leave, and childcare support for mothers who returned to work, work protection for women, and extensive access to medical control in all stages of pregnancy, as well as after it. Medical control was seen as one of the most productive effects of the law, since all women who became pregnant were under the care of a qualified medical practitioner, even in rural areas. In some cases, if a woman was unable to visit a medical office, a doctor would visit her home. Mothers of at least five children were entitled to receive significant benefits, while mothers of at least ten children were declared "heroine mothers" by the Romanian state.

=== Speech of 21 August 1968 ===
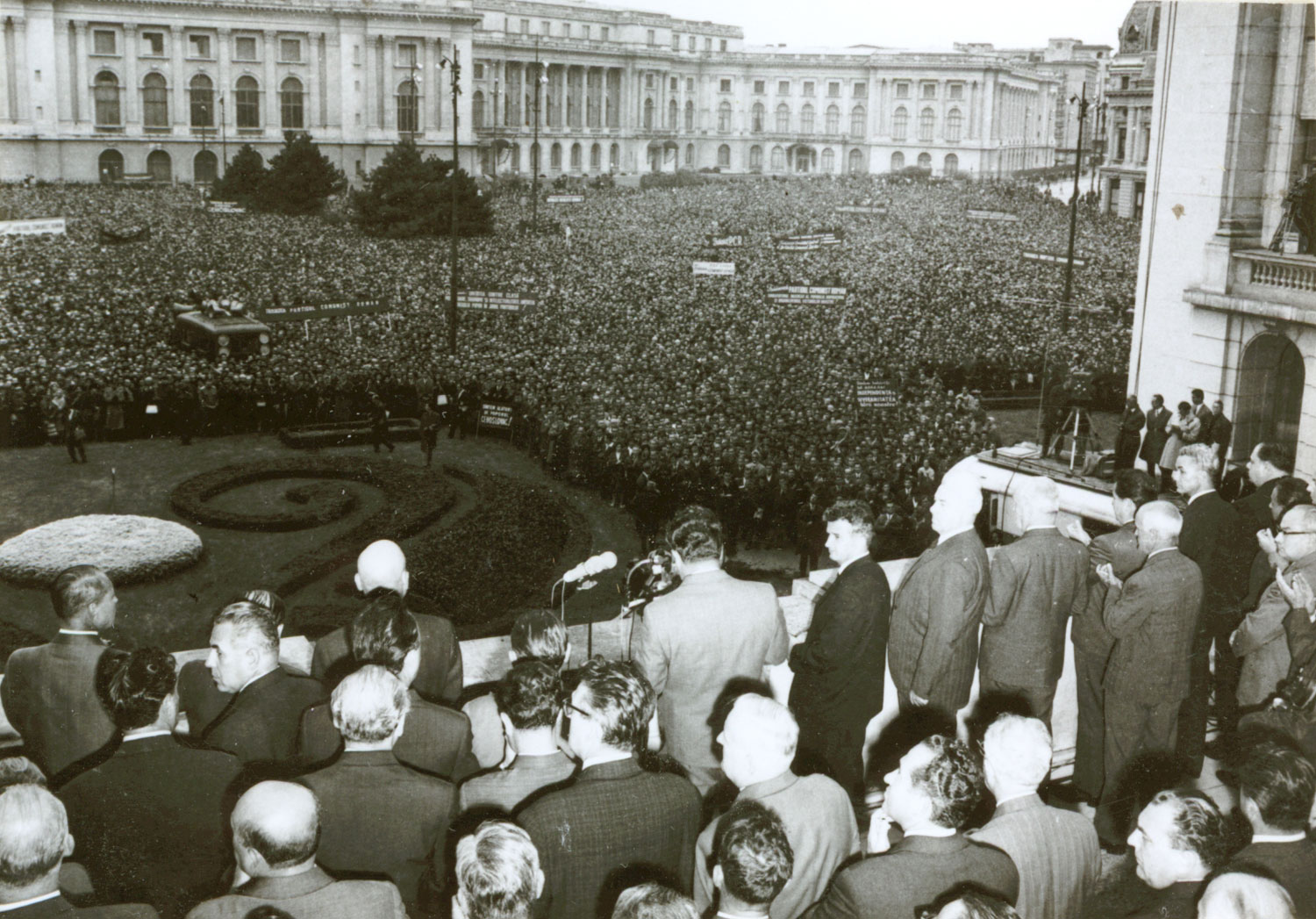
Nicolae Ceaușescu condemning the Warsaw Pact invasion of Czechoslovakia in 1968

Ceaușescu's speech of 21 August 1968 represented the apogee of Ceaușescu's rule. It marked the highest point in Ceaușescu's popularity, when he openly condemned the Warsaw Pact invasion of Czechoslovakia.

=== July Theses ===
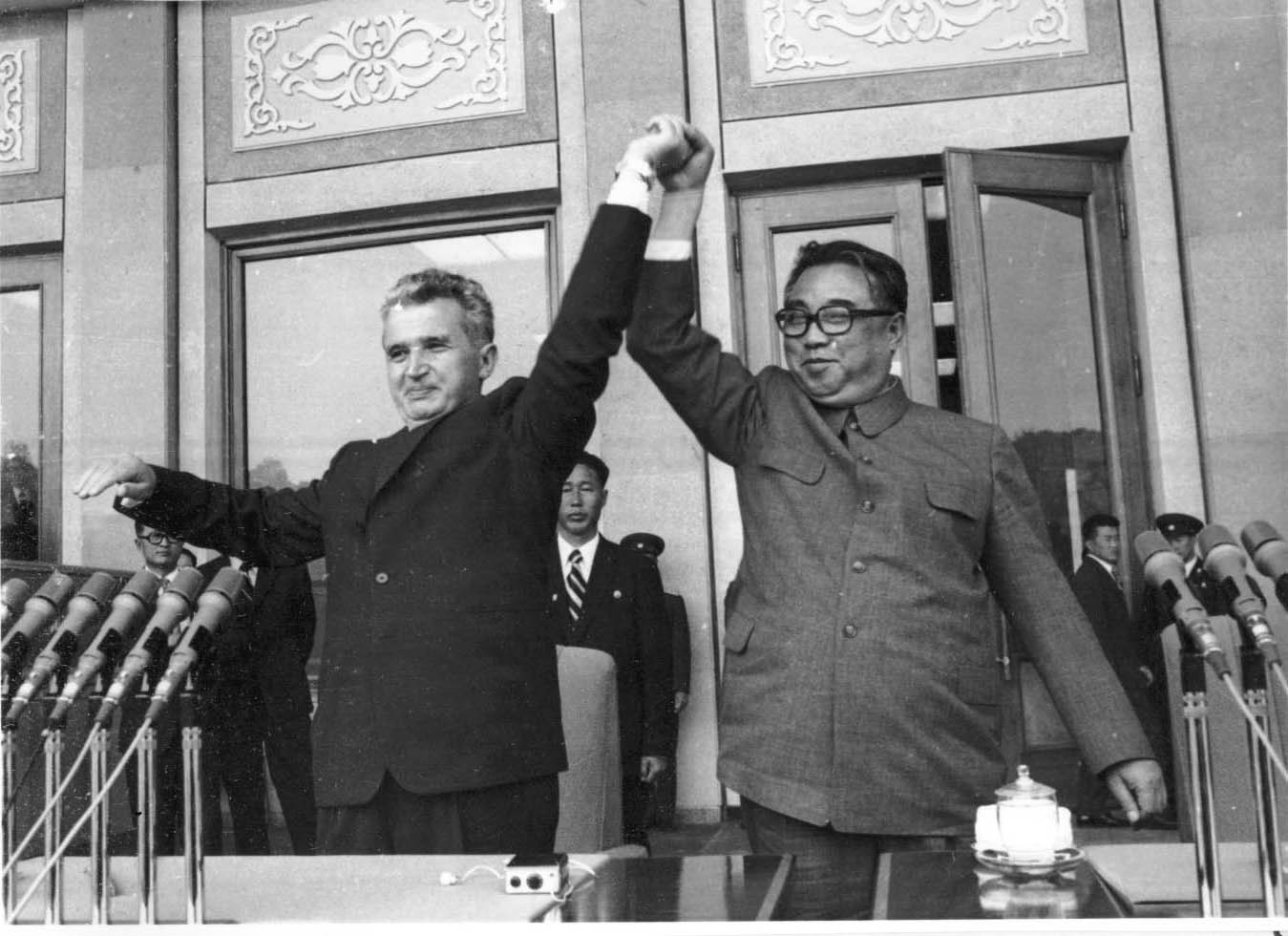
Ceaușescu with Kim Il Sung of North Korea in 1978. In reforming the state, Ceaușescu sought to emulate Juche and Maoist ideas

Ceaușescu visited China, North Korea, Mongolia and North Vietnam in 1971. He took great interest in the idea of total national transformation as embodied in the programmes of North Korea's Juche and China's Cultural Revolution. He was also inspired by the personality cults of North Korea's Kim Il Sung and China's Mao Zedong. Journalist Edward Behr claimed that Ceaușescu admired both Mao and Kim as leaders who not only totally dominated their nations but had also used totalitarian methods coupled with significant ultra-nationalism mixed in with communism in order to transform both China and North Korea into major world powers. Furthermore, that Kim and even more so Mao had broken free of Soviet control were additional sources of admiration for Ceaușescu. According to British journalist Edward Behr, Elena Ceaușescu allegedly bonded with Mao's wife, Jiang Qing. Behr wrote that the possibility that what Ceaușescu had seen in both China and North Korea were "vast Potemkin villages for the hoodwinking of gullible foreign guests" was something that never seemed to have crossed his mind. Shortly after returning home, he began to emulate North Korea's system. North Korean books on Juche were translated into Romanian and widely distributed inside the country.

On 6 July 1971, he delivered a speech before the executive committee of the Romanian Communist Party. This quasi-Maoist speech, which came to be known as the July Theses, contained seventeen proposals. Among these were: continuous growth in the "leading role" of the Party; improvement of Party education and of mass political action; youth participation on large construction projects as part of their "patriotic work"; an intensification of political-ideological education in schools and universities, as well as in children's, youth and student associations; and an expansion of political propaganda, orienting radio and television shows to this end, as well as publishing houses, theatres and cinemas, opera, ballet, artists' unions, promoting a "militant, revolutionary" character in artistic productions. Gheorghiu-Dej's process of removing Stalinist policies and Stalin's cult of personality between 1956 and 1965 was condemned and an index of banned books and authors was re-established.

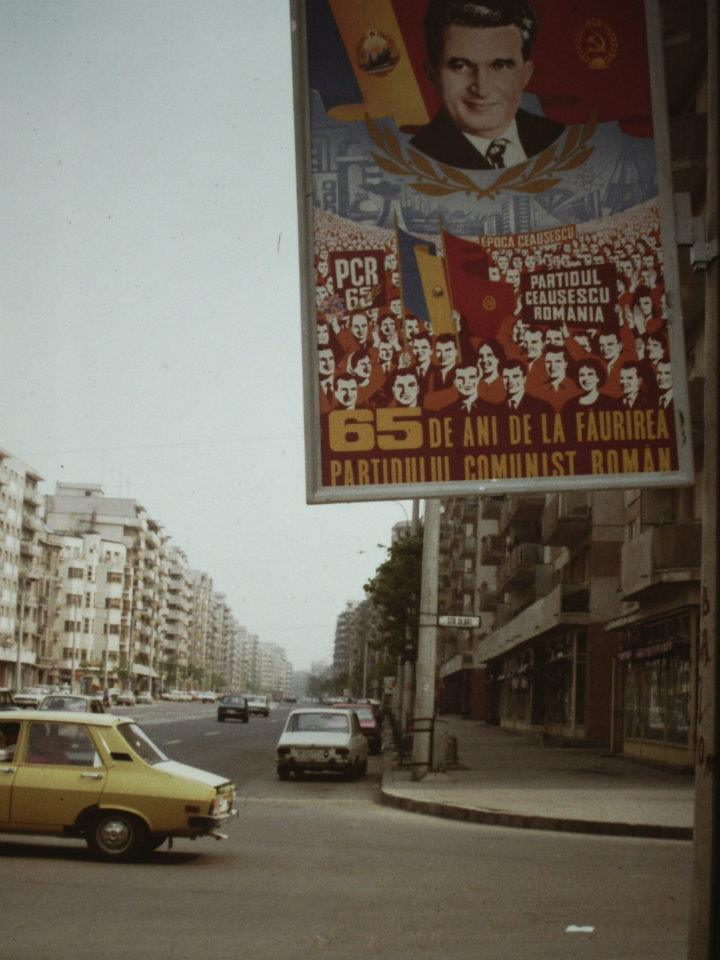
Propaganda poster in Bucharest, 1986. By the 1970s, the Ceaușescus had developed a personality cult

The Theses heralded the beginning of a "mini cultural revolution" in Romania, launching a Neo-Stalinist offensive against cultural autonomy, reaffirming an ideological basis for literature that, in theory, the Party had hardly abandoned. Although presented in terms of "Socialist Humanism", the Theses in fact marked a return to the strict guidelines of Socialist Realism and attacks on non-compliant intellectuals. Strict ideological conformity in the humanities and social sciences was demanded.

In a 1972 speech, Ceaușescu stated he wanted "a certain blending of party and state activities ... in the long run we shall witness an ever closer blending of the activities of the party, state and other social bodies". In practice, a number of joint party-state organisations were founded such as the Council for Socialist Education and Culture, which had no precise counterpart in any of the other communist states of Eastern Europe, and the Romanian Communist Party was embedded into the daily life of the nation in a way that it never had been before. In 1974, the party programme of the Romanian Communist Party announced that structural changes in society were insufficient to create a full socialist consciousness in the people, and that a full socialist consciousness could only come about if the entire population was made aware of socialist values that guided society. The Communist Party was to be the agency that would so "enlighten" the population, and in the words of the British historian Richard Crampton, "the party would merge state and society, the individual and the collective, and would promote 'the ever more organic participation of party members in the entire social life'".

=== President of the Socialist Republic of Romania ===
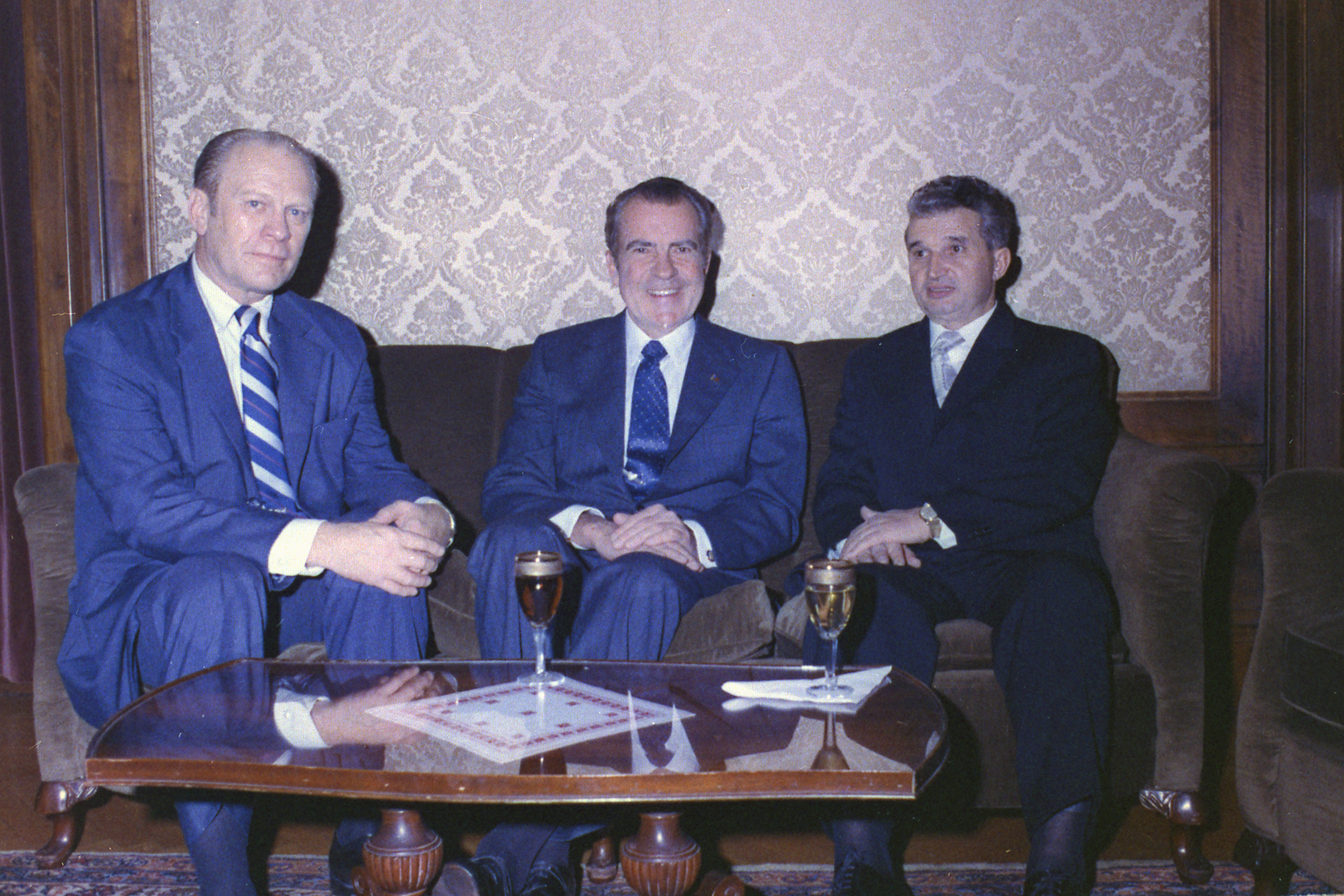
Ceaușescu with US president Richard Nixon and vice president Gerald Ford in 1973

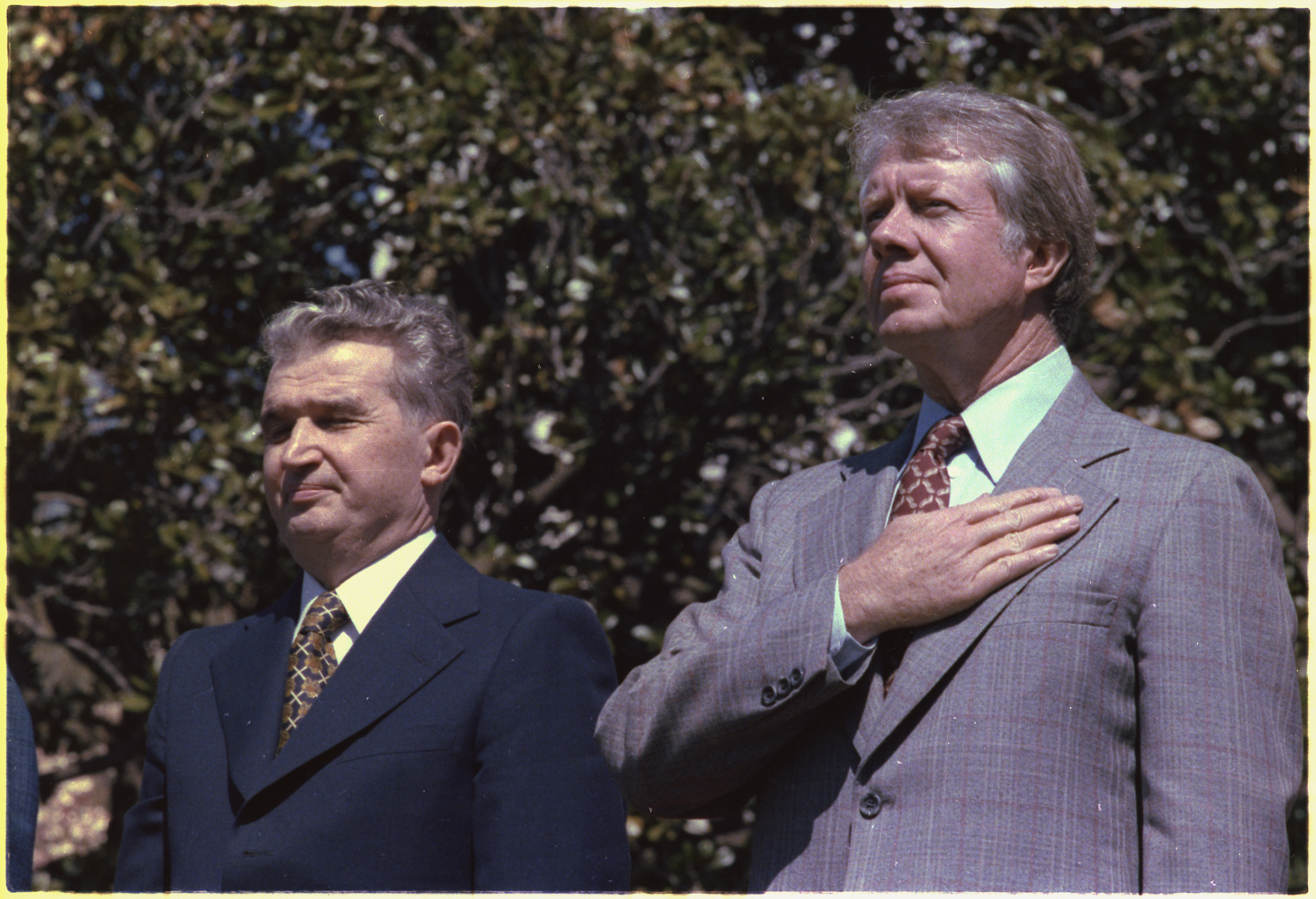
Ceaușescu with Jimmy Carter during a visit in Washington, D.C. in 1978

Ceaușescu had been head of state since 1967, though nominally only as first among equals, deriving his real power from his status as party leader. This was similar to the current power structure in China, whose paramount leader serves as president while deriving his power from his post as party leader.

However, in 1974 Ceaușescu converted the presidency of the State Council into a full-fledged executive presidency, making him the nation's top decision-maker in name and in fact. He was first elected to this post in 1974 and would be reelected every five years until 1989, all unopposed.

As President, Ceaușescu was vested with very broad executive power. He remained ex officio president of the State Council, and was empowered to carry out any of its functions that did not require plenums. He also appointed and dismissed the president of the Supreme Court and the prosecutor general whenever the GNA was not in session. In practice, from 1974 onwards Ceaușescu frequently ruled by decree. Over time, he usurped many powers and functions that nominally were vested in the State Council as a whole.

On paper, like all state officials, he was responsible to the GNA, which was constitutionally the highest organ of state power. In practice, the principles of democratic centralism, combined with the GNA's infrequent sessions (it sat in full session only twice a year) meant that his decisions had the force of law. Effectively, Ceaușescu now held all governing power in the nation; virtually all party and state institutions were subordinated to his will.

=== Oil embargo, strike and foreign relations ===
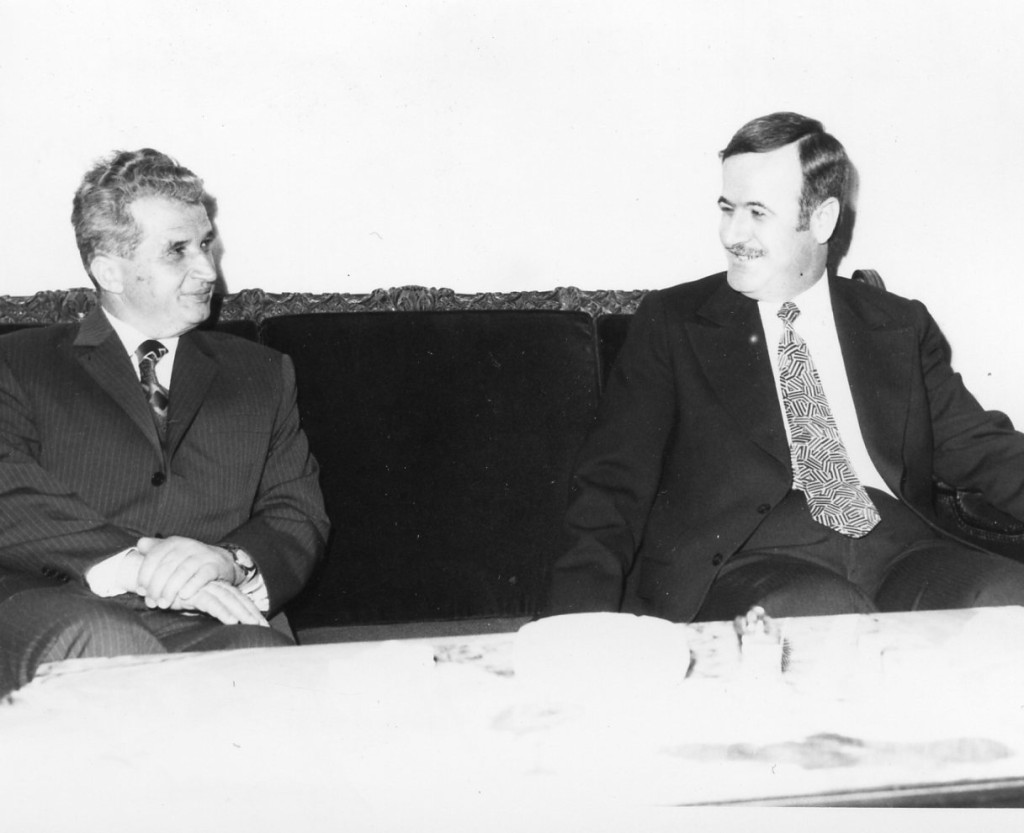
Ceaușescu with Hafez al-Assad during a 1974 state visit to Syria

Starting with the 1973–1974 Arab oil embargo against the West, a period of prolonged high oil prices set in that characterised the rest of the 1970s. Romania as a major oil equipment producer greatly benefited from the high oil prices of the 1970s, which led Ceaușescu to embark on an ambitious plan to invest heavily in oil-refining plants. Ceaușescu's plan was to make Romania into Europe's number one oil refiner not only of its own oil, but also of oil from Middle Eastern states such as Iraq and Iran, and then to sell all of the refined oil at a profit on the Rotterdam spot market. As Romania lacked the money to build the necessary oil refining plants and Ceaușescu chose to spend the windfall from the high oil prices on aid to the Third World in an attempt to buy Romania international influence, Ceaușescu borrowed heavily from Western banks on the assumption that when the loans came due, the profits from the sales of the refined oil would be more than enough to pay off the loans. Meanwhile, Romania also imported Soviet oil, but the Soviets refused to grant Romania the preferential oil pricing that Warsaw Pact states received. The 1977 earthquake which destroyed much of Bucharest led to delays in the oil plan. By the time the oil refining plants were finished in the early 1980s, a slump in oil prices had set in, leading to major financial problems for Romania.

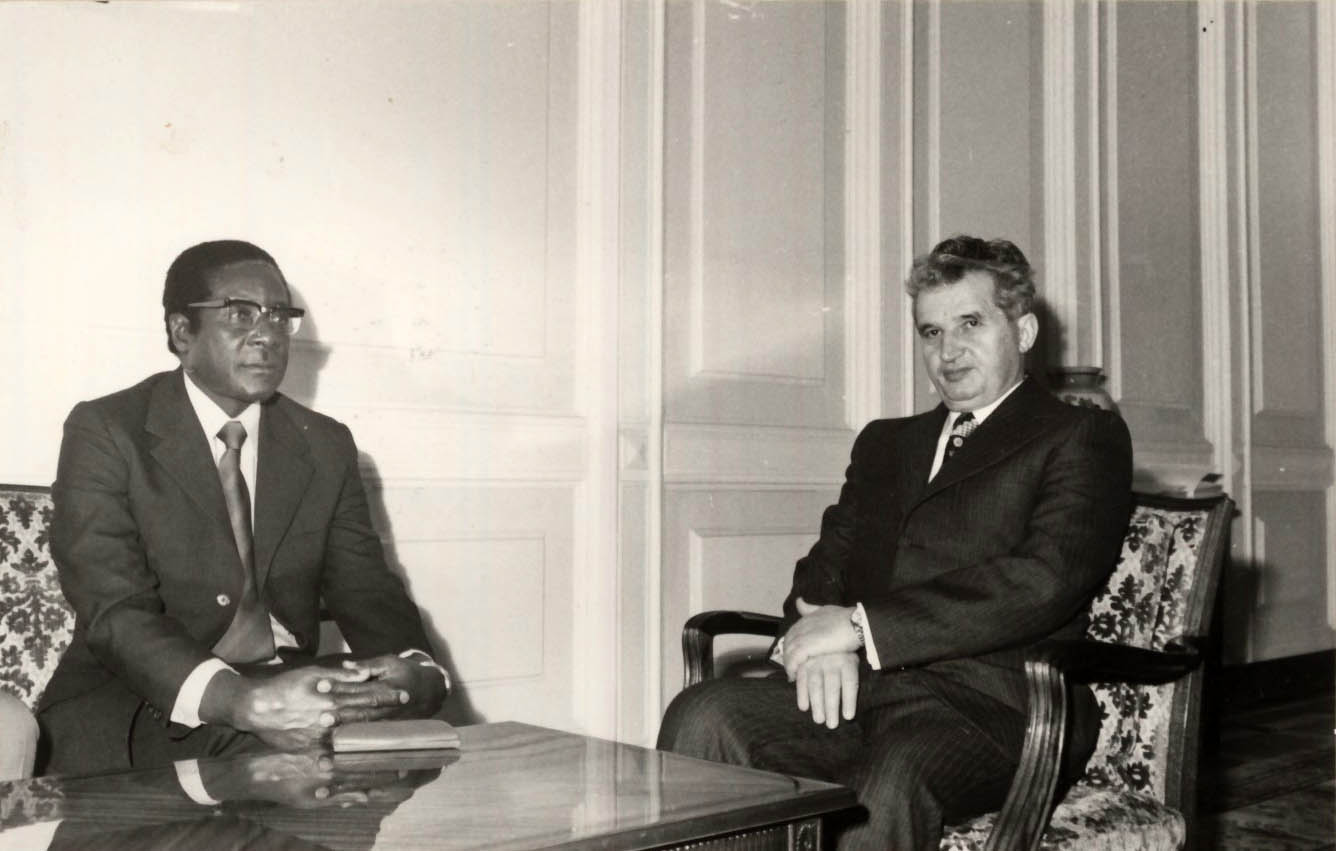
Ceaușescu in a meeting with Robert Mugabe in 1976

In August 1977 over 30,000 miners went on strike in the Jiu River valley complaining of low pay and poor working conditions. The Jiu valley miners' strike was the most significant expression of opposition to Ceaușescu's rule prior to the late 1980s. The striking miners were inspired by similar strikes along Poland's Baltic coast in December 1970, and just as in Poland in 1970, the striking Romanian miners demanded face-to-face negotiations with their nation's leader. When Ceaușescu appeared before the miners on the third day of the strike, he was greeted (in the words of the British historian Richard Crampton) "once again à la polonaise, with cries of 'Down with the Red Bourgeoisie!'". Ceaușescu ultimately negotiated a compromise solution to the strike. In the years after the strike, a number of its leaders died of accidents and "premature disease". Rumors emerged that Securitate had doctors give the strike leaders 5-minute chest X-rays to ensure the development of cancer.

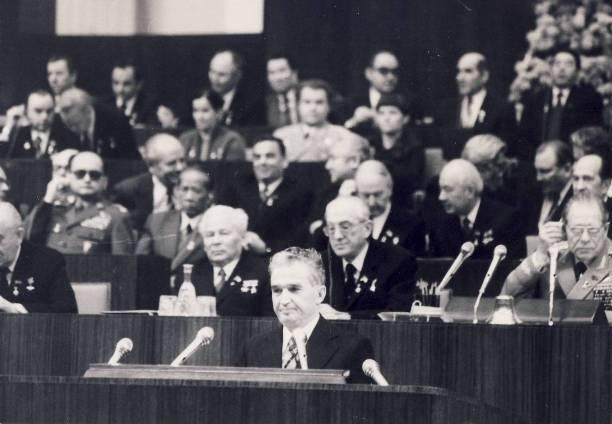
Ceaușescu preparing to deliver a speech in Moscow on the 60th anniversary of the Soviet Union

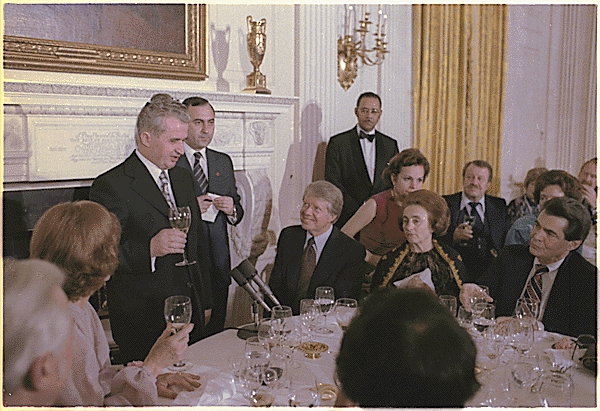
Ceaușescu with Jimmy Carter during a visit in Washington, D.C. in 1978

He continued to follow an independent policy in foreign relations—for example, in 1984, Romania was one of few communist states (notably including the People's Republic of China and Yugoslavia) to take part in the 1984 Summer Olympics in Los Angeles, despite a Soviet-led boycott. The Socialist Republic of Romania was also the first of the Eastern Bloc nations to have official relations with the Western bloc and the European Community: an agreement including Romania in the Community's Generalised System of Preferences was signed in 1974 and an Agreement on Industrial Products was signed in 1980. On 4 April 1975, Ceaușescu visited Japan and met with Emperor Hirohito. In June 1978, Ceaușescu made a state visit to the UK where a £200m licensing agreement was signed between the Romanian government and British Aerospace for the production of more than eighty BAC One-Eleven aircraft. The deal was said at the time to be the biggest between two countries involving civil aircraft. This was the first state visit by a Communist head of state to the UK, and Ceaușescu was given an honorary knighthood by the Queen, which was revoked on the day before his death in 1989. Similarly, in 1983, US vice president George H. W. Bush and in 1985 US Secretary of State George Shultz also praised the Romanian dictator.

=== Pacepa defection ===
In 1978, Ion Mihai Pacepa, a senior member of the Romanian political police (Securitate, State Security), defected to the US. A two-star general, he was the highest-ranking defector from the Eastern Bloc during the Cold War. His defection was a powerful blow against the administration, forcing Ceaușescu to overhaul Romania's state security architecture. Pacepa's 1986 book, Red Horizons: Chronicles of a Communist Spy Chief (ISBN 0-89526-570-2), claimed to expose details of Ceaușescu's government activities, such as massive spying on American industry and elaborate efforts to rally Western political support.

==== Systematisation: demolition and reconstruction ====
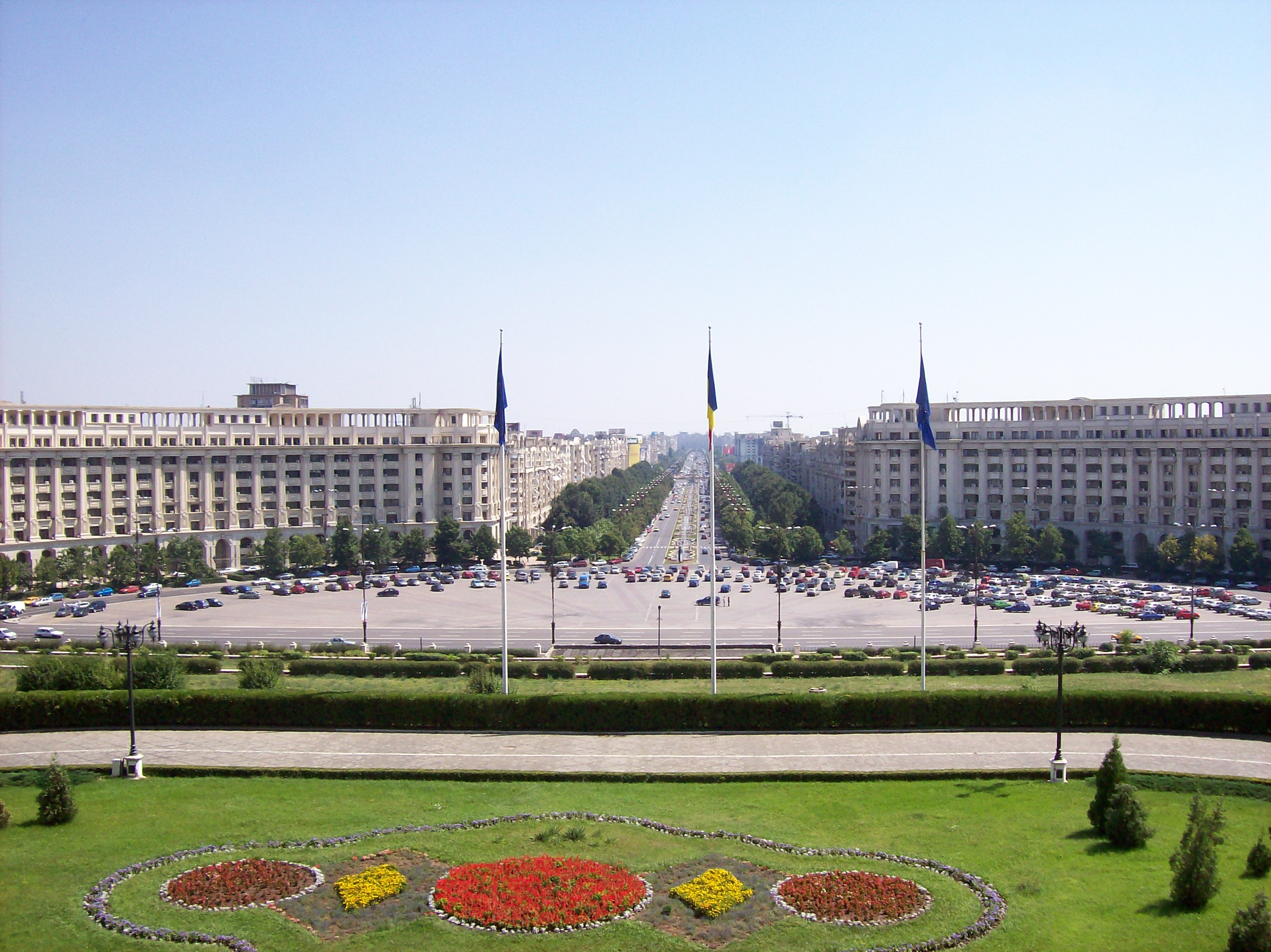
Bulevardul Unirii, Bucharest

Systematisation (Romanian: Sistematizarea) was the programme of urban planning carried out under Ceaușescu's regime. After a visit to North Korea in 1971, Ceaușescu was impressed by the Juche ideology of that country, and began a major campaign shortly afterwards.

Beginning in 1974, the programme consisted largely of the demolition and reconstruction of existing hamlets, villages, towns and cities, in whole or in part, with the stated goal of turning Romania into a "multilaterally developed socialist society". The policy largely consisted in the mass construction of high-density blocks of flats (blocuri).

During the 1980s, Ceaușescu became obsessed with building himself a palace of unprecedented proportions, along with an equally grandiose neighborhood, Centrul Civic, to accompany it. The mass demolitions that occurred in the 1980s under which an overall area of eight square kilometres of the historic centre of Bucharest were leveled, including monasteries, churches, synagogues, a hospital and a noted Art Deco sports stadium, in order to make way for the imposing Centrul Civic and the House of the Republic, now officially renamed the Palace of Parliament, were the most extreme manifestation of this policy.

In 1988, a massive rural resettlement effort began.

=== Foreign debt ===
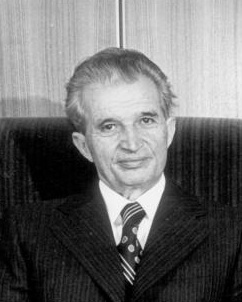
Ceaușescu in 1988

Ceaușescu's political independence from the Soviet Union and his protest against the invasion of Czechoslovakia in 1968 drew the interest of Western powers, whose governments briefly believed that he was an anti-Soviet maverick and hoped to create a schism in the Warsaw Pact by funding him. Ceaușescu did not realise that the funding was not always favourable, borrowing heavily (more than $13 billion) from the West to finance economic development, with these loans ultimately devastating the country's finances. He also secured a deal for cheap oil from Iran, but the deal fell through after the Shah Mohammad Reza Pahlavi was overthrown in 1979 during the Iranian Revolution.

In an attempt to correct this, Ceaușescu decided to repay Romania's foreign debts. He organised the 1986 military referendum and managed to change the constitution, adding a clause that barred Romania from taking foreign loans in the future. According to official results, the referendum yielded a nearly unanimous "yes" vote.

Romania's record—having all of its debts to commercial banks paid off in full—has not been matched by any other heavily indebted country in the world. The policy to repay—and, in multiple cases, prepay—Romania's external debt became the dominant policy in the late 1980s. The result was economic stagnation throughout the 1980s and, towards the end of the decade, an economic crisis. The country's industrial capacity was eroded as equipment grew obsolete and energy intensity increased, and the standard of living deteriorated significantly. Draconian restrictions were imposed on household energy use to ensure adequate supplies for industry. Convertible currency exports were promoted at all costs and imports severely reduced. In 1988, real GDP contracted by 0.5%, mostly due to a decline in industrial output caused by significantly increased material costs. Despite the 1988 decline, the net foreign balance reached its decade-long peak (9.5% of GDP). In 1989, GDP slumped by a further 5.8% due to growing shortages and the increasingly obsolete capital stock. By March 1989, virtually all external debt had been repaid, including all medium- and long-term external debt. The remaining amount, totalling less than 1 million, consisted of short-term credits (mainly short-term export credits granted by Romania). A 1989 decree legally prohibited Romanian entities from contracting external debt. The CIA World Factbook edition of 1990 listed Romania's external debt as "none" as of mid-1989.

==== Yearly evolution (in billions of dollars) ====
- 1995 was the last year in which Romania's economy was dominated by the state. From 1996 onwards, the private sector would account for most of Romania's GDP.
- Data for 1975, 1980 and 1982–1988 taken from the Statistical Abstract of the United States.
- Data for 1989–1995 provided by the OECD.
- Data for 1981 and 1985 provided by the World Book Year Book.
- By April 1989, with its debt virtually zero, Romania was a net external creditor. Foreign borrowing was resumed after December 1989. In order to maintain net creditor status, Romania had to keep its external debt under $2.5 billion, the low estimate of the amount it was owed by oil producers and other LDCs. This was first achieved in 1988 and continued through the early 1990s.

	1975	1980	1981	1982	1983	1984	1985	1986	1987	1988	1989	1990	1991	1992	1993	1994	1995
Gross external debt	2.9	9.4	10.2	9.8	8.8	7.1	6.6	6.4	5.1	2.2	0.0	0.2	2.2	3.5	4.5	5.5	6.7
Net status	debtor	debtor	debtor	debtor	debtor	debtor	debtor	debtor	debtor	creditor	creditor	creditor	creditor	debtor	debtor	debtor	debtor

=== 1984 failed coup d'état attempt ===
A tentative coup d'état planned in October 1984 failed when the military unit assigned to carry out the plan was sent to harvest maize instead.

=== 1987 Brașov rebellion ===
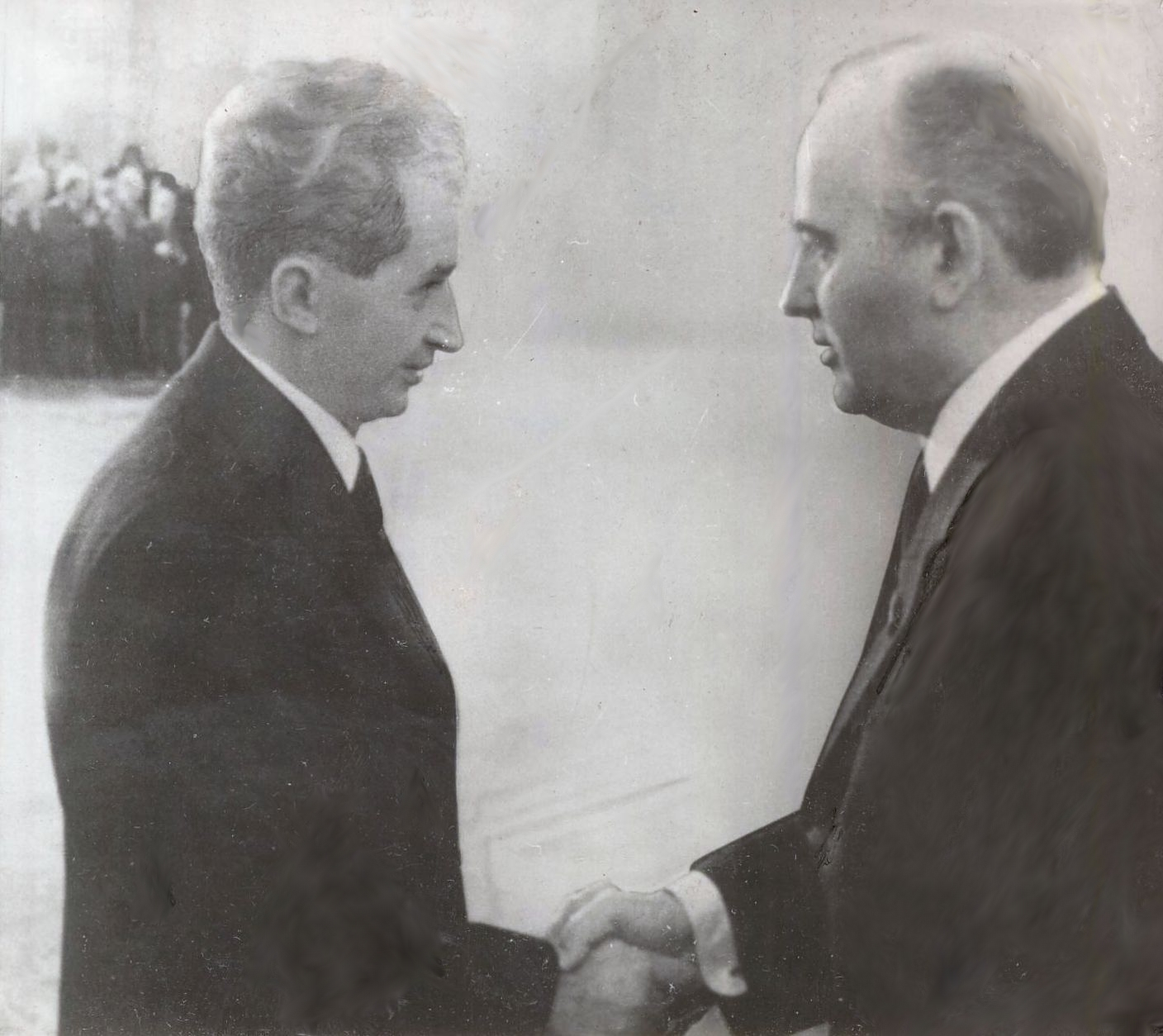
Ceaușescu with Soviet leader Mikhail Gorbachev in 1985

Romanian workers began to mobilise against the economic policies of Ceaușescu. Spontaneous labour conflicts, limited in scale, took place in major industrial strongholds such as Cluj-Napoca (November 1986) and the Nicolina platform in Iași (February 1987), culminating in a massive strike in Brașov. The draconian measures taken by Ceaușescu involved reducing energy and food consumption, as well as lowering workers' incomes, leading to what political scientist Vladimir Tismăneanu called "generalised dissatisfaction".

Over 20,000 workers and a number of townspeople marched against economic policies in Socialist Romania and Nicolae Ceaușescu's policies of rationing of basic foodstuffs, rationing electricity and central heating.

The first protests began practically on 14 November 1987, at the 440 "Molds" Section of the Red Flag truck company. Initially, the protests were for basic needs: "We want food and heating!", "We want our money!", "We want food for the children!", "We want light and heat!" and "We want bread without a card!" Next to the County Hospital, they sang the anthem of the revolution of 1848, "Deșteaptă-te, române!". Upon arriving in the city centre, thousands of workers from the Tractorul Brașov and Hidromecanica factories, pupils, students, and others joined the demonstration. From this moment on, the protest became political. Participants later claimed to have chanted slogans such as "Down with Ceaușescu!", "Down with communism!", "Down with the dictatorship!" or "Down with the tyrant!". During the march, members of the Securitate disguised as workers infiltrated the demonstrators, or remained on the sidelines as spectators, photographing or even filming.

By dusk, Securitate forces and the military surrounded the city centre and disbanded the revolt by force. Some 300 protesters were arrested, and, in order to hide the political nature of the Brașov uprising, tried for disturbing the peace and "outrage against morals".

Those under investigation were beaten and tortured, 61 receiving sentences ranging from 6 months to 3 years in prison, including sentences to be carried out working at various state enterprises across in the country. Although many previous party meetings had called for the death penalty to set an example, the regime was eager to downplay the uprising as "isolated cases of hooliganism". Protesters were sentenced to deportation, with compulsory residence arranged in other cities, despite such measures having been repealed as far back as the late 1950s. The entire trial lasted only an hour and a half.

A few days after the workers' revolt, Cătălin Bia, a student at the Faculty of Forestry, sat in front of the canteen with a placard that read: "The arrested workers must not die". He was joined by colleagues Lucian Silaghi and Horia Șerban. The three were arrested immediately. Subsequently, graffiti in solidarity with the workers' revolt appeared on the campus, and some students distributed manifestos. Security teams conducted a total of seven arrests. Those arrested were investigated, expelled from the faculty, returned to their home localities and placed under strict supervision, along with their families.

=== Romani minority rights ===
Under the Ceaușescu regime, Romani people in Romania were largely neglected as an ethnic group. They were not listed among the "co-inhabiting nationalities", preventing them from gaining any collective government representation.

However, during the late 1970s and early 1980s the regime conducted a sedentarisation campaign for nomadic and semi-nomadic Romani, providing them with dwellings and guaranteeing them jobs. Although this led to some displacement of Romanis from counties with a large nomadic population, historians consider it a social measure rather than an ethnically-motivated policy. The systematisation policy provided urban Romanies with better living conditions, as many were moved from insalubrious neighbourhoods at the edges of towns into newly built blocks of flats, however it had negative effects on the cohesion of Romani communities.

Dedicated policies for the Romani community began to be implemented in 1977. A government report from 1983 lists some of these policies: the authorities made land available to them and assisted them in the procurement of building materials for houses; many were given jobs; those lacking official identification were registered at the civil status office; measures were taken to legalise marriages, to send children to school, to enlist men for military services and to supervise their hygiene. The report however notes that a significant part of the Romani population resisted these policies, thus the social integration of the community within the Romanian society was still lagging behind.

== Revolution ==
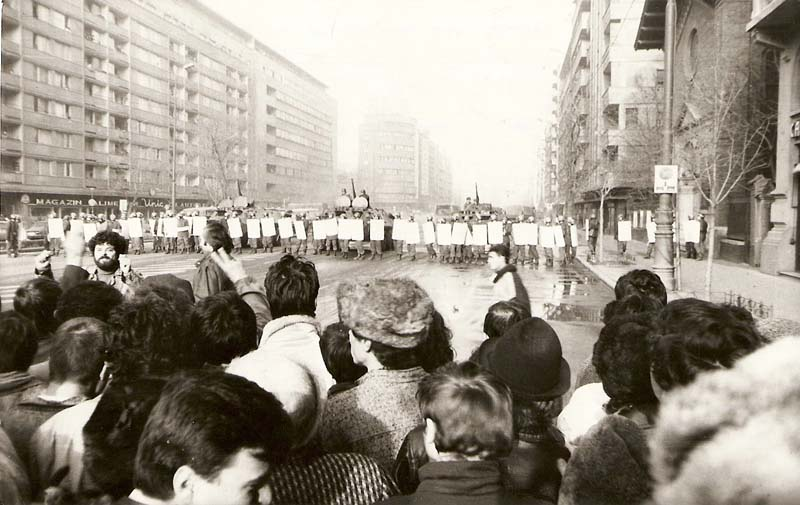
Tanks and Miliția on the Magheru Boulevard in Bucharest during the 1989 Revolution

In November 1989, the 14th Congress of the Romanian Communist Party (PCR) saw Ceaușescu, then aged 71, re-elected for another five years as leader of the PCR. During the Congress, Ceaușescu made a speech denouncing the anti-Communist revolutions happening throughout the rest of Eastern Europe. The following month, Ceaușescu's government itself collapsed after a series of violent events in Timișoara and Bucharest.

Czechoslovak President Gustáv Husák's resignation on 10 December 1989 amounted to the fall of the Communist regime in Czechoslovakia, leaving Ceaușescu's Romania as the only remaining hard-line Communist regime in the Warsaw Pact.

=== Timișoara ===
Demonstrations in the city of Timișoara were triggered by the government-sponsored attempt to evict László Tőkés, an ethnic Hungarian pastor, accused by the government of inciting ethnic hatred. Members of his ethnic Hungarian congregation surrounded his apartment in a show of support.

Romanian students spontaneously joined the demonstration, which soon lost nearly all connection to its initial cause and became a more general anti-government demonstration. Regular military forces, police, and the Securitate fired on demonstrators on 17 December 1989, killing and injuring men, women, and children.

On 18 December 1989, Ceaușescu departed for a state visit to Iran, leaving the duty of crushing the Timișoara revolt to his subordinates and his wife. Upon his return to Romania on the evening of 20 December, the situation became even more tense, and he gave a televised speech from the TV studio inside the Central Committee Building (CC Building), in which he spoke about the events at Timișoara in terms of an "interference of foreign forces in Romania's internal affairs" and an "external aggression on Romania's sovereignty".

The country, which had little to no information of the events transpiring in Timișoara from the national media, learned about the revolt from anti-communist radio stations that broadcast news in the Eastern Bloc throughout the Cold War (such as Voice of America and Radio Free Europe) and by word of mouth. On the next day, 21 December, Ceaușescu staged a mass meeting in Bucharest. Official media presented it as a "spontaneous movement of support for Ceaușescu", emulating the 1968 meeting in which he had spoken against the invasion of Czechoslovakia by Warsaw Pact forces.

=== Overthrow ===
==== Speech on 21 December 1989 ====
The mass meeting of 21 December, held in what is now Revolution Square, began like many of Ceaușescu's speeches over the years. He spoke of the achievements of the "Socialist revolution" and Romania's "multi-laterally developed Socialist society". He also blamed the Timișoara riots on "fascist agitators who want to destroy socialism".

But Ceaușescu had misjudged the crowd's mood. Roughly eight minutes into his speech, several people began jeering and booing, and others began chanting "Timișoara!" He tried to silence them by raising his right hand and calling for the crowd's attention before order was temporarily restored, then proceeded to announce social benefit reforms that included raising the national minimum wage by 200 lei per month to a total of 2,200 per month by 1 January. Images of Ceaușescu's facial expression as the crowd began to boo and heckle him were among the most widely broadcast of the collapse of communism in Eastern Europe.

Failing to control the crowd, the Ceaușescus took cover inside the building that housed the Central Committee of the Romanian Communist Party. The rest of the day saw an open revolt of Bucharest's population, which had assembled in University Square and confronted the police and army at barricades. But the rioters were no match for the military apparatus concentrated in Bucharest, which cleared the streets by midnight and arrested hundreds of people in the process.

==== Flight on 22 December ====
By the morning of 22 December 1989, protests had spread to most major cities across Romania. The death of Defence Minister Vasile Milea, announced by state media as a suicide, caused confusion and anger within the armed forces and the public. Ceaușescu convened an emergency meeting of the Political Executive Committee and assumed direct command of the army, but many soldiers and officers defected to the revolution. Later that day he attempted to address the crowd assembled outside the Central Committee building in Bucharest, but was shouted down as demonstrators stormed the headquarters. Ceaușescu, his wife Elena, and several aides escaped by helicopter from the roof shortly before protesters overran the building. The Romanian Communist Party collapsed soon afterward and has never been re-established.

Early reports in the Western press claimed that tens of thousands of people had been killed by Securitate forces during the uprising, with some newspapers citing figures of up to 64,000 fatalities across Romania. The Hungarian military attaché in Bucharest expressed doubt over these figures, noting that such numbers would have been logistically impossible. In the weeks following Ceaușescu’s overthrow, hospitals across the country reported a death toll of fewer than 1,000, a figure broadly supported by later academic research. Of these, only 306 are documented to have died while Ceaușescu was still in power.

=== Death ===
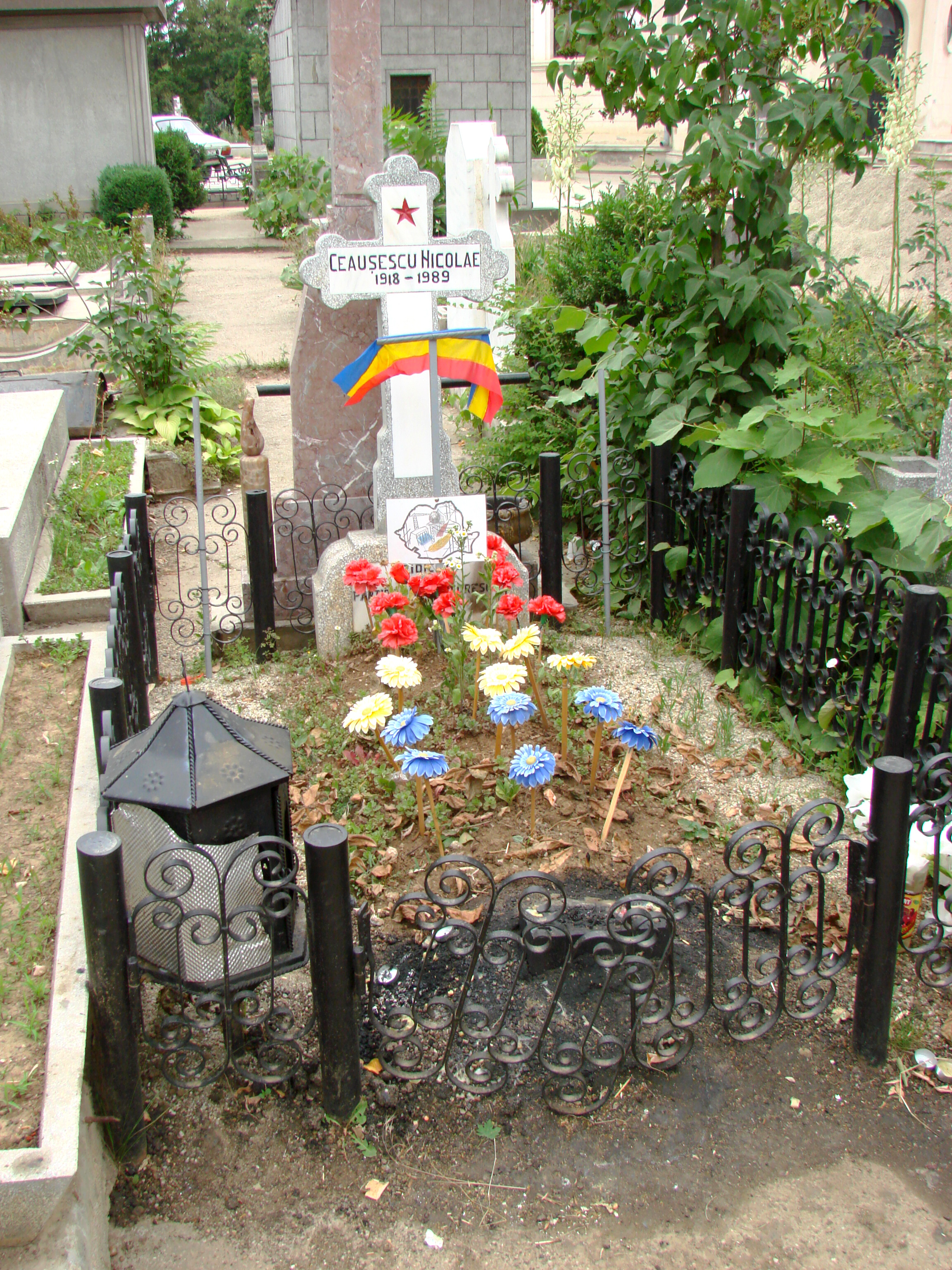
Ceaușescu's original grave, Ghencea Cemetery, Bucharest

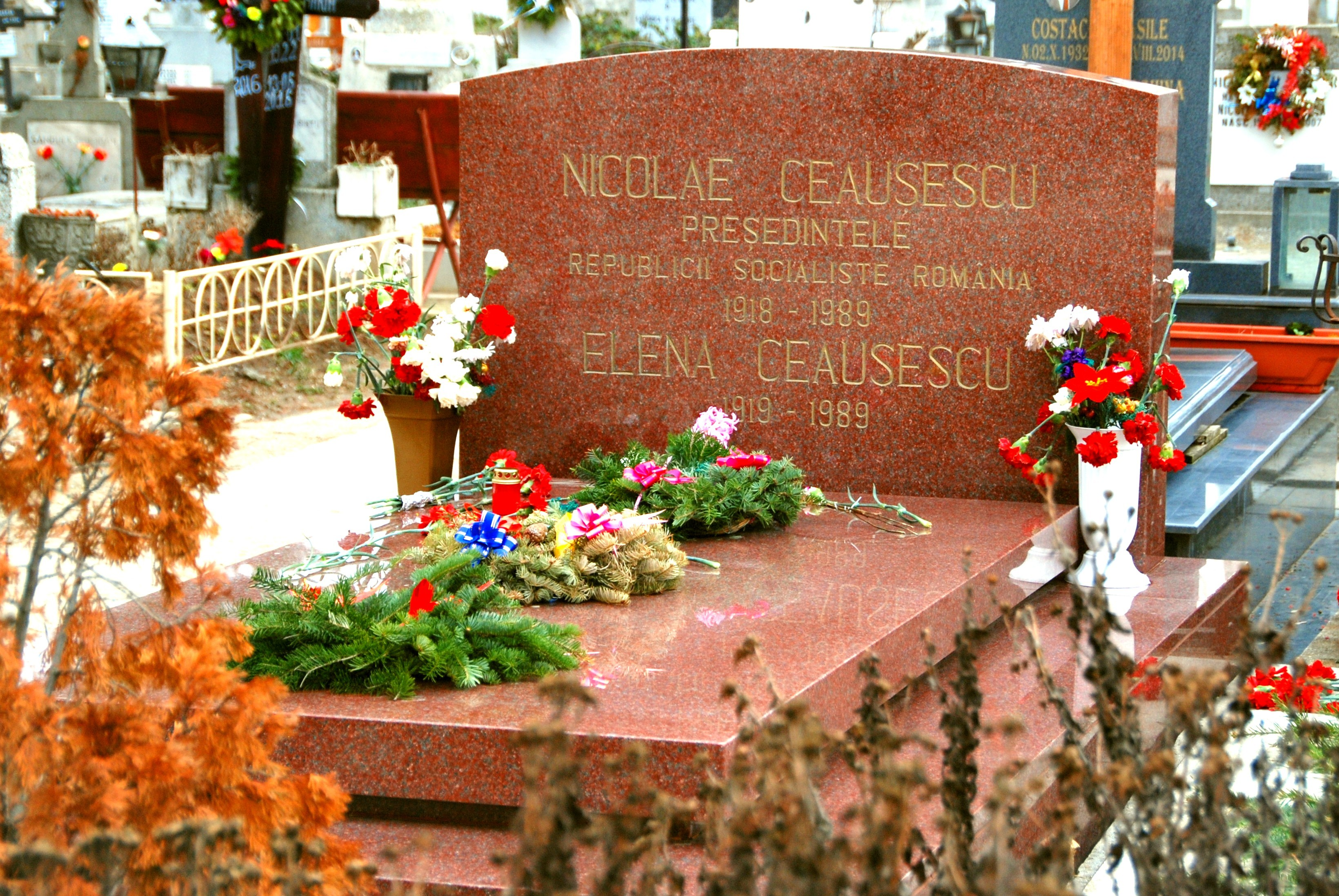
The current resting place of Nicolae and Elena Ceaușescu at Ghencea Cemetery. The tombstone erroneously states Elena's year of birth as 1919; she was born on 7 January 1916

Ceaușescu and his wife Elena fled the capital with Emil Bobu and Manea Mănescu and flew by helicopter to Ceaușescu's Snagov residence, from which they fled again, this time to Târgoviște. They abandoned the helicopter near Târgoviște, having been ordered to land by the army, which by that time had restricted flying in Romania's airspace. The Ceaușescus were held by the police while the officers listened to the radio. They were eventually handed over to the army.

On Christmas Day, 25 December 1989, the Ceaușescus were tried before a court convened in a small room on orders of the National Salvation Front, Romania's provisional government. They faced charges including illegal gathering of wealth and genocide. Ceaușescu repeatedly denied the court's authority to try him, and asserted he was still legally the President of Romania. At the end of the trial, the Ceaușescus were found guilty and sentenced to death. A soldier standing guard in the proceedings was ordered to take the Ceaușescus outside one by one and shoot them, but the Ceaușescus demanded to die together. The soldiers agreed to this and began to tie their hands behind their backs, which the Ceaușescus protested against, but were powerless to prevent.

Nicolae and Elena Ceaușescu were executed by a group of soldiers: Captain Ionel Boeru, Sergeant-Major Georghin Octavian and Dorin-Marian Cîrlan, and five other non-commissioned officers who were recruited from twenty volunteers. Nicolae Ceaușescu was singing "The Internationale" as he was shot.

Later that day, the execution was also shown on Romanian television. The hasty show trial and the images of the executed Ceaușescus were videotaped and the footage released in numerous Western countries two days after the execution.

The manner in which the trial was conducted has been criticised. However, Ion Iliescu, Romania's provisional president, said in 2009 that the trial was "quite shameful, but necessary" in order to end the state of near-anarchy that had gripped the country in the three days since the Ceaușescus fled Bucharest. Similarly, Victor Stănculescu, who had been defence minister before going over to the revolution, said, in 2009, that the alternative would have been seeing the Ceaușescus lynched on the streets of Bucharest.

The Ceaușescus were the last people to be executed in Romania before the abolition of capital punishment on 7 January 1990.

Nicolae and Elena Ceaușescu were originally buried in simple graves at Ghencea Cemetery, in Bucharest, on opposite sides of a path; their graves were often decorated with flowers and symbols of communist rule. In April 2007, their son Valentin Ceaușescu lost an appeal for an investigation into whether the graves were genuine. Upon his death in 1996, the younger son, Nicu, was buried nearby in the same cemetery. According to the Jurnalul Național, requests were made by the Ceaușescus' daughter, Zoia, and by supporters of their political views, to move their remains to mausoleums or to purpose-built churches. These demands were denied by the government.

==== Exhumation and reburial ====
On 21 July 2010, forensic scientists exhumed the bodies to perform DNA tests to prove conclusively that they were indeed the remains of the Ceaușescus. The body believed to be Elena's had decayed too much to allow for a positive identification, but Nicolae was easily identifiable, wearing the bullet-riddled black winter coat he had been wearing during the execution. DNA tests were able to conclusively prove his identity. His family organised a funeral service for the couple, and they were reburied together at Ghencea under a tombstone.

== Policies ==
A Romanian Encyclopedic Dictionary entry in 1978 underlines the concept as "a new, superior, stage in the Socialist development of Romania ... begun by the 1971–1975 Five-Year Plan, prolonged over several [succeeding and projected] Five-Year Plans".

The main trait of Ceaușescu's ideology was a form of Romanian nationalism, one which arguably propelled Ceaușescu to power in 1965, and probably led the Party leadership under Ion Gheorghe Maurer to select him over the more orthodox Gheorghe Apostol. Although he had previously been a careful supporter of the official lines, Ceaușescu came to embody Romanian society's wish for independence after what many considered years of Soviet directives and purges, during and after the SovRom fiasco. He carried this nationalist option inside the Party, manipulating it against the nominated successor, Apostol. This nationalist policy had more timid precedents: for example, Gheorghiu-Dej had overseen the withdrawal of the Red Army in 1958.

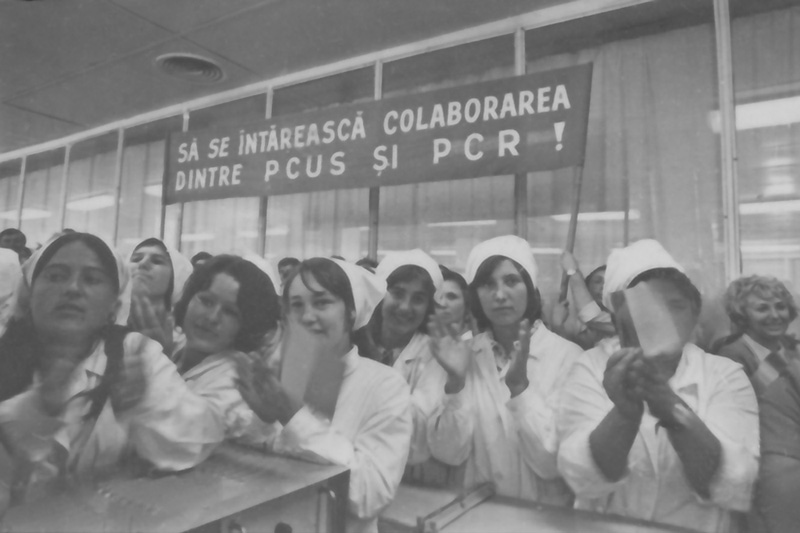
Moldavian workers during Ceaușescu's visit to Soviet Moldavia in 1972

This nationalist policy had also engineered the publishing of several works that subverted the Soviet image, no longer glossing over traditional points of tension with the Soviet Union.

Ceaușescu was prepared to take a more decisive step in questioning Soviet policies. In the early years of his rule, he generally relaxed political pressures inside Romanian society, which led to the late 1960s and early 1970s being the most liberal decade in Socialist Romania. Gaining the public's confidence, Ceaușescu took a clear stand against the 1968 crushing of the Prague Spring by Leonid Brezhnev. After a visit from Charles de Gaulle earlier in the same year, during which the French President gave recognition to the incipient maverick, Ceaușescu's public speech in August deeply impressed the population, not only through its themes, but also because, uniquely, it was unscripted. He immediately attracted Western sympathies and backing, which lasted well beyond the 'liberal' phase of his rule; at the same time, the period brought forward the threat of armed Soviet invasion: significantly, many young men inside Romania joined the Patriotic Guards created on the spur of the moment, in order to meet the perceived threat. President Richard Nixon was invited to Bucharest in 1969, which was the first visit of a US president to a communist country after the start of the Cold War.

Ceaușescu rejected Alexander Dubček’s reformist programme of Socialism with a human face, considering it incompatible with Romania’s own communist model. Although he condemned the Soviet-led invasion of Czechoslovakia in 1968, Ceaușescu maintained an enduring partnership with Josip Broz Tito’s Yugoslavia, adapting the Titoist doctrine of “independent socialist development” to Romania’s circumstances. The 1965 constitution renamed the country the Socialist Republic of Romania to emphasize its claim of building socialism free from Moscow’s direction, echoing Yugoslavia’s earlier rebranding in 1963.

Following his 1971 visits to China and North Korea, Ceaușescu issued the July Theses, inspired in part by Maoist and Juche concepts and signalling a return to strict ideological control. At the Eleventh Party Congress in 1974, cultural policy was formally subordinated to nationalist objectives. The regime promoted Protochronism and Dacianism, encouraging historians to portray the ancient Dacians as precursors of the socialist state, and renamed several cities to reflect Dacian or Roman heritage, such as Cluj-Napoca and Drobeta-Turnu Severin.

Although Ceaușescu pursued an ostensibly independent “national communist” course, his concentration of power and the pervasive personality cult surrounding him led outside observers to describe his regime as among the most Stalinist in Eastern Europe. Among his most visible admirers was Iosif Constantin Drăgan, a Romanian-Italian businessman who propagated Dacianist and protochronist ideas that paralleled the regime’s nationalist discourse.

Nicolae Ceaușescu had a major influence on modern-day Romanian populist rhetoric. In the 1970s, a certain rehabilitation of pro-Nazi dictator Ion Antonescu was permitted to take place: while not explicitly condoned by authorities, the pro-regime novelist Marin Preda painted a "nuanced" and sympathetic picture of Antonescu in his 1975 work Delirul. The conflict with Hungary over the treatment of the Magyar minority in Romania had several unusual aspects: not only was it a vitriolic argument between two officially Socialist states, it also marked the moment when Hungary, a state behind the Iron Curtain, appealed to the Organisation for Security and Co-operation in Europe for sanctions to be taken against Romania. This meant that the later 1980s were marked by a pronounced anti-Hungarian discourse, which owed more to nationalist tradition than to Marxism, and the ultimate isolation of Romania on the world stage.

The strong opposition to Ceaușescu on all forms of perestroika and glasnost placed him at odds with Mikhail Gorbachev. He was very displeased when other Warsaw Pact countries decided to try their own versions of Gorbachev's reforms. In particular, he was incensed when Poland's leaders opted for a power-sharing arrangement with the Solidarity trade union. He even went as far as to call for a Warsaw Pact invasion of Poland—a significant reversal, considering how violently he had opposed the invasion of Czechoslovakia 20 years earlier. For his part, Gorbachev made no secret of his distaste for Ceaușescu, whom he called "the Romanian führer". At a meeting between the two, Gorbachev upbraided Ceaușescu for his inflexible attitude. "You are running a dictatorship here", the Soviet leader warned.

In November 1989, at the 14th and last congress of the PCR, Ceaușescu condemned the Molotov–Ribbentrop Pact and suggested that the Soviet Union was repeating its mistake of appeasement towards an aggressive power by growing closer to the United States. This provided an indication of Ceaușescu's fear at the time of both superpowers interfering in Romanian domestic affairs. He also called for the reversal of the Pact's consequences, which would amount to the return of Bessarabia (most of which was then a Soviet republic and since 1991 has been independent Moldova) and northern Bukovina; both of these had been occupied by the Soviet Union in 1940 and again at the end of World War II.

=== Non-aligned policy feats ===
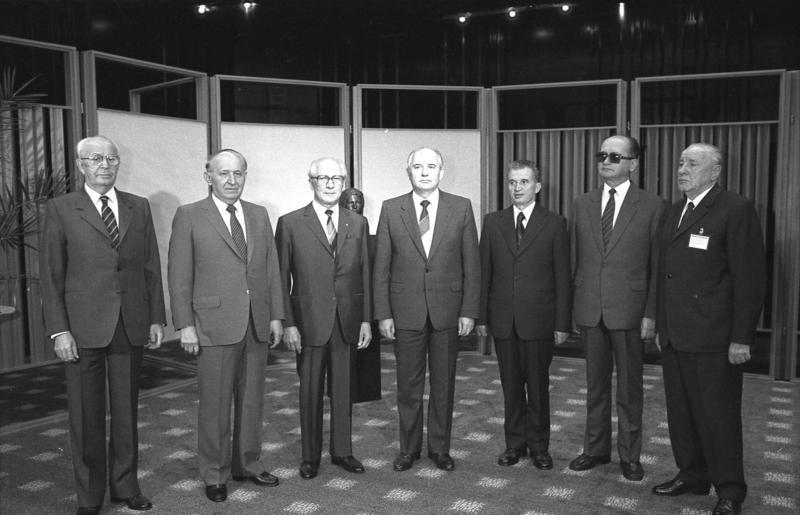
Warsaw Pact leaders in 1987 from left to right: Husák of Czechoslovakia, Zhivkov of Bulgaria, Honecker of East Germany, Gorbachev of the Soviet Union, Ceaușescu, Jaruzelski of Poland, and Kádár of Hungary

Ceaușescu was among the most ardent supporters of dimming lingering tensions between different Balkan states, and went as far as to establish friendly relations with the vituperatively anti-communist Regime of the Colonels in Greece to pursue his objectives of cooperation between Balkan countries.

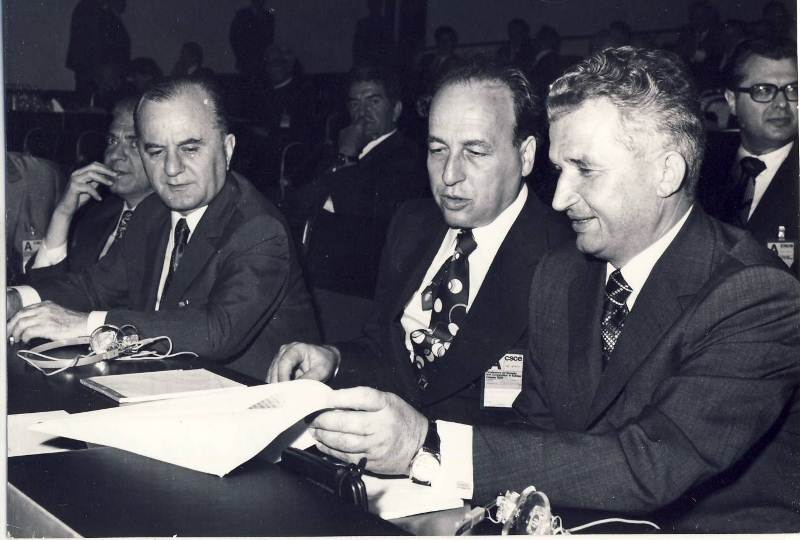
Ceaușescu with Ștefan Andrei and George Macovescu at CSCE Meeting in Helsinki, Finland in 1975

Ceaușescu's Romania was the only Eastern Bloc country that retained diplomatic relations with Israel and did not sever diplomatic relations after Israel's strike on Egypt at the start of the Six-Day War in 1967, to the consternation of the Soviet Union. Ceaușescu made efforts to act as a mediator between the PLO and Israel.

Similarly, Romania was the only Eastern Bloc country to attend the 1984 Summer Olympics in Los Angeles, which had been boycotted by the Soviet Union and its allies in response to the US-led boycott of the 1980 Summer Olympics in Moscow.

Ceaușescu's Romania was the only Warsaw Pact country that did not sever diplomatic relations with Chile after Augusto Pinochet seized power in the 1973 coup d'état.

Nicolae Ceaușescu was a close ally and personal friend of dictator Mobutu Sese Seko of Zaire (now the Democratic Republic of the Congo). Relations were in fact not just state-to-state, but party-to-party between their respective political machineries, the MPR and the PCR. Many believe that Ceaușescu's death played a role in influencing Mobutu to "democratise" Zaire in 1990.

Ceaușescu reduced the size of the Romanian People's Army by 5%, for which he called the 1986 mock referendum in which 100% voted in favour. In line with his policy of keeping a façade of "popular democracy", he also ordered large rallies for peace to be held.

==== Moldavian Soviet Socialist Republic ====
In August 1976, Nicolae Ceaușescu was the first high-level Romanian visitor to the Moldavian SSR since World War II. In December 1976, at one of his meetings in Bucharest, Ivan Bodiul said that "the good relationship was initiated by Ceaușescu's visit to Soviet Moldova".

=== Personality cult and totalitarianism ===
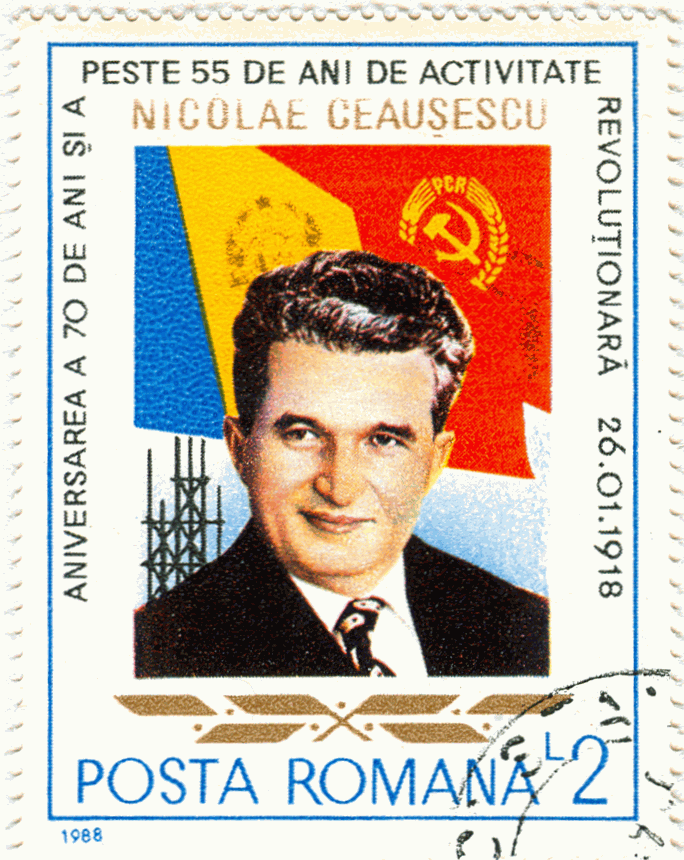
Stamp commemorating Ceaușescu's 70th birthday and 55 years of political activity, 1988

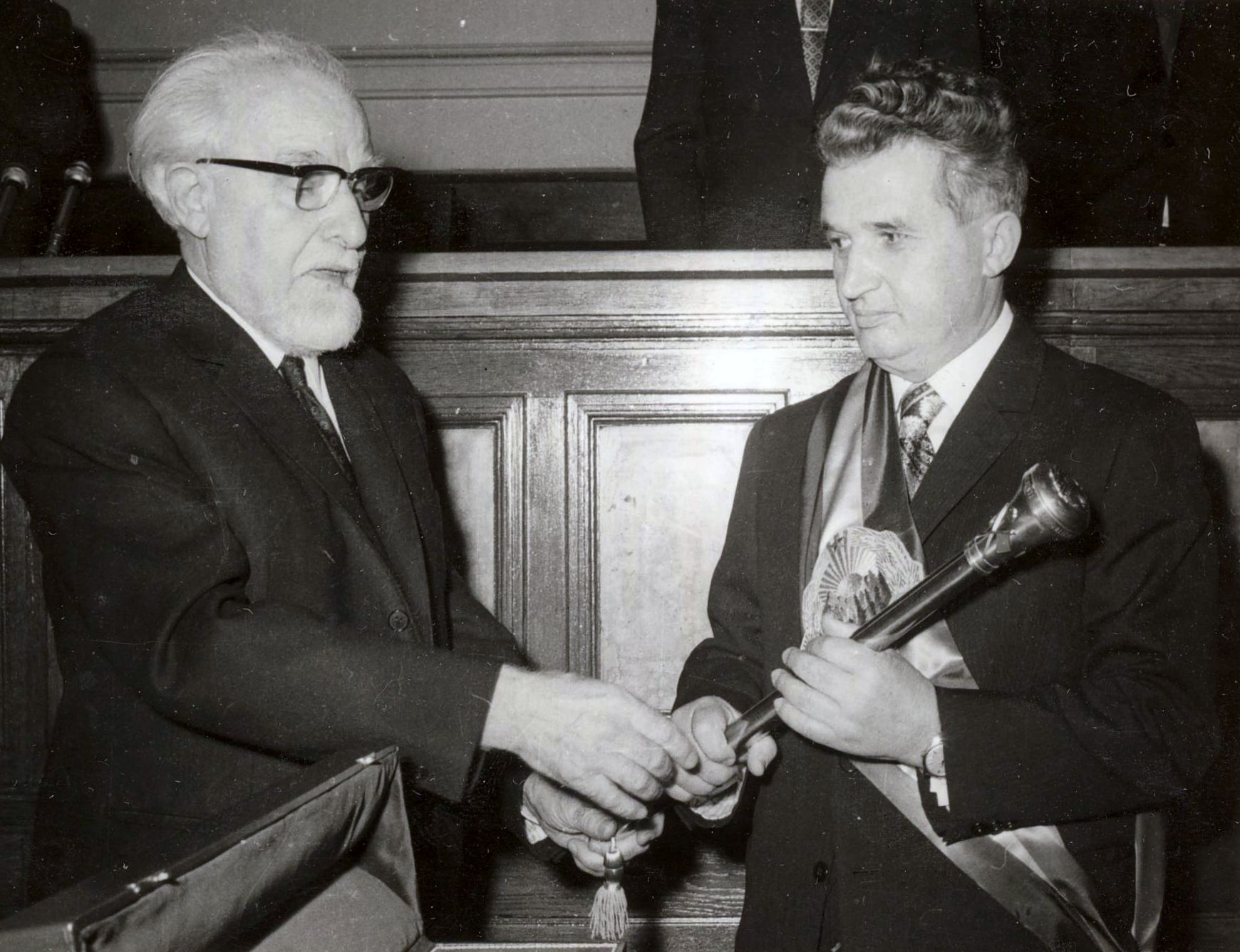
Ceaușescu receiving the presidential sceptre, 1974

Ceaușescu created a pervasive personality cult, giving himself titles such as "Conducător" ("Leader") and "Geniul din Carpați" ("The Genius of the Carpathians"), with inspiration from Proletarian Culture (Proletkult). After his election as President of Romania, he even had a "presidential sceptre" created for himself, thus appropriating a royal insignia. This excess prompted painter Salvador Dalí to send a congratulatory telegram to the Romanian president, in which he sarcastically congratulated Ceaușescu on his "introducing the presidential sceptre". The Communist Party daily Scînteia published the message, unaware that it was a work of satire.

The most important day of the year during Ceaușescu's rule was his official birthday, 26 January—a day which saw Romanian media saturated with praise for him. According to historian Victor Sebestyen, it was one of the few days of the year when the average Romanian put on a happy face, since appearing miserable on this day was too risky to contemplate.

To lessen the chance of further treason after Pacepa's defection, Ceaușescu also invested his wife Elena and other members of his family with important positions in the government. This led Romanians to joke that Ceaușescu was creating "socialism in one family", a pun on "socialism in one country".

Ceaușescu was greatly concerned about his public image. For years, nearly all official photographs of him showed him in his late 40s. Romanian state television was under strict orders to portray him in the best possible light. Additionally, great care was taken by producers to ensure that Ceaușescu’s height—1.68 metres (5 ft 6 in)—was never conspicuously highlighted on screen. Consequences for breaking these rules were severe; one producer showed footage of Ceaușescu blinking and stuttering, and was banned for three months.

As part of a propaganda ploy arranged by the Ceaușescus through the consular cultural attachés of Romanian embassies, they managed to receive orders and titles from numerous states and institutions. France granted Nicolae Ceaușescu the Legion of Honour. In 1978 he became a Knight Grand Cross of the Order of the Bath (GCB) in the UK, a title of which he was stripped in 1989. Elena Ceaușescu was arranged to be "elected" to membership of a science academy in the US.

To execute a massive redevelopment project, the Ceaușescu government conducted extensive demolition of churches and many other historic structures in Romania. According to Alexandru Budistenu, former chief architect of Bucharest:

"The sight of a church bothered Ceaușescu. It didn't matter if they demolished or moved it, as long as it was no longer in sight"

— Alexandru Budistenu, 9 January 2019

Nevertheless, a project by Romanian engineer Eugeniu Iordachescu was able to move many historic structures to less prominent sites, thus saving them.

==== IKEA ====
In the 1980s under Ceaușescu, the Securitate received six-figure payments from Swedish furniture company IKEA. According to declassified files at the National Council for the Study of the Securitate Archive, IKEA agreed to overcharge for products made in Romania and some of the overpayment funds were deposited into an account controlled by the Securitate.

== Legacy ==
Ceaușescu had a mixed reputation among international leaders of his time. In his memoir The Artful Albanian, Albanian communist leader Enver Hoxha remarked "As if Ceaușescu and company are to bring down imperialism! If the world waits for the Ceaușescus to do such a thing, imperialism will live for tens of thousands of years..." According to Pacepa, Libyan leader Muammar Gaddafi had an opposite interpretation, allegedly saying, "My brother! You are my brother for the rest of my life!". Ceaușescu even received praise from anti-communist figures, with the Iranian shah Mohammad Reza Pahlavi acclaiming Ceaușescu's leadership, stating in his 1979 memoir: "I would like to salute [Ceaușescu's] intransigent patriotism and ferocious will for independence. A veritable amity links me to him".

He directed the construction of the Palace of the Parliament in Bucharest, which broke ground in June 1984. It was previously called The House of the People and The People's House. The building of the Palace of the Parliament was the most extreme expression of the Systematisation programme imposed by Ceaușescu upon Romania, being an urban planning programme used to convert villages into miniature cities. The main architect of the building was Anca Petrescu (1949–2013), who began her work on the building when she was 28 years old. The building was completed in 1997, after Ceaușescu's death in 1989. The Romanian Senate, which was originally housed in the former building of the Central Committee of the Romanian Communist Party, has been headquartered in the Parliamentary Palace since 2004.

The Parliamentary Palace building has 1,100 rooms and is the largest civilian government building in the world as measured by volume in one continuous structure. (There are larger private sector buildings, mainly for the construction of aircraft, that have more continuous volume in one building, such as the Boeing Everett Factory.) Much of the building remains empty, being larger than the Parliament needs, though Parliament shares it with three museums and an international conference centre. It is also the heaviest building in the world, being constructed of 700,000 tonnes of steel and bronze, a million square feet of marble, and large amounts of crystal and wood.

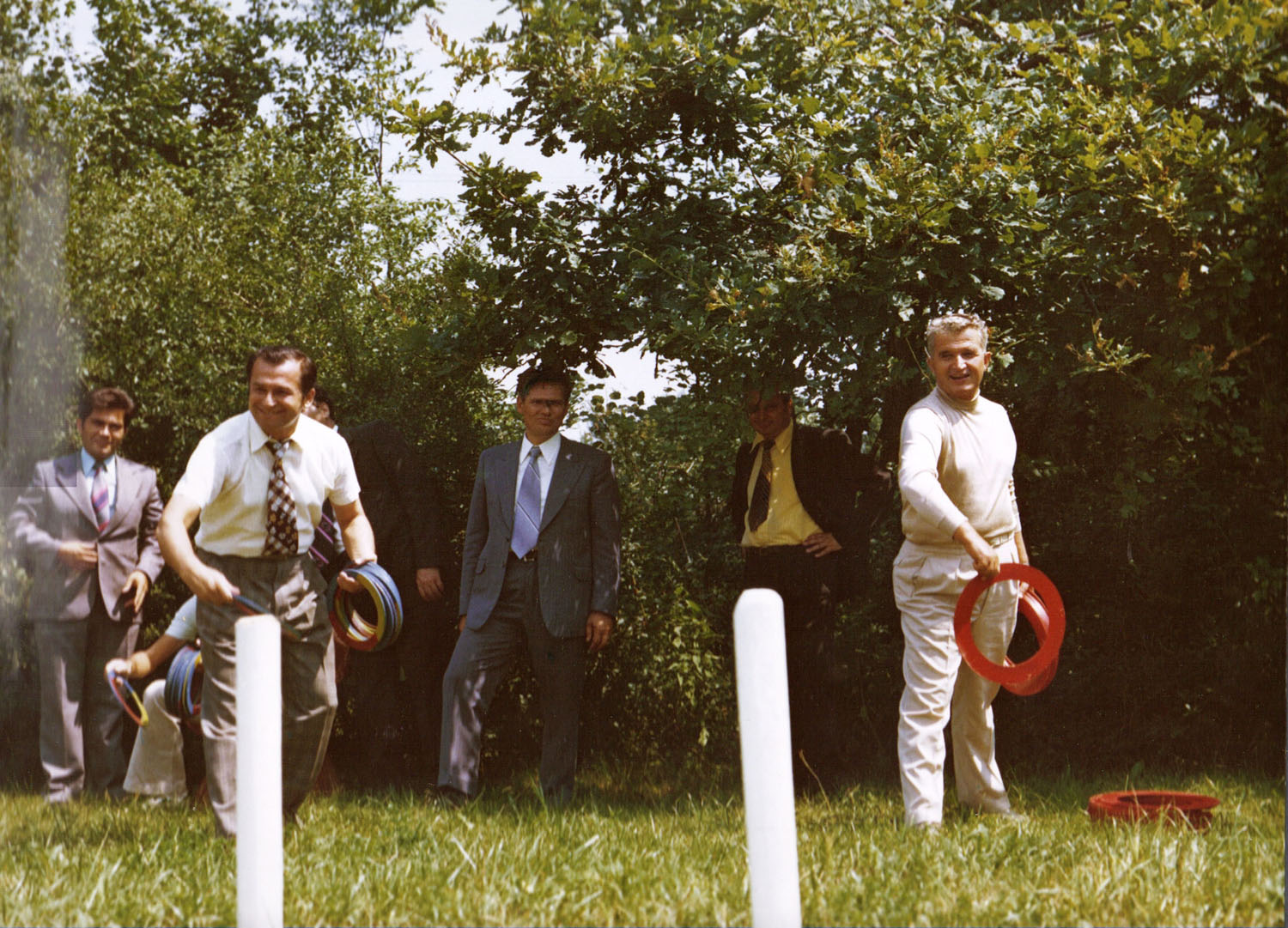
Ceaușescu and his future successor, Ion Iliescu, in 1976

The Ceaușescus had three children: Valentin (born 1948), a nuclear physicist; Zoia (1949–2006), a mathematician; and Nicu Ceaușescu (1951–1996), a physicist. After the death of his parents, Nicolae Ceaușescu ordered the construction of an Orthodox church, the walls of which are decorated with portraits of his parents.

Praising the crimes of totalitarian governments and denigrating their victims is forbidden by law in Romania; this includes the Ceaușescu era. Dinel Staicu was fined 25,000 lei (approx. 9,000 US dollars) for praising Ceaușescu and displaying his pictures on his private television channel (3TV Oltenia). Opinion polls held in 2010 indicated that 41% of Romanians would have voted for Ceaușescu if given the opportunity and 63% felt their lives were better before 1989. In 2014, the percentage of those who would vote for Ceaușescu reached 46%. On 27 December 2018, a poll found 64% of people had a good opinion of him. In 2025, an INSCOP research survey found 66.2% of Romanians having a favourable opinion of him, with a net approval rating of 42%.

After Ceaușescu's overthrow, politicians such as Corneliu Vadim Tudor have coupled the image of his regime with the Ion Antonescu regime into their versions of a national Pantheon.

56% of Romanians believed more positive than negative developments occurred under communism, including broad approval of Ceaușescu's regime in the fields of governmental efficiency, education, healthcare, production, cultural identity, public safety, global standing, and reductions in corruption. Simultaneously, over 80% of those surveyed were aware of the regime having significantly less freedom (including torture of dissidents), and over 90% were aware of rationing and restriction of movement.

In 2006, Televiziunea Română conducted a vote to determine whom the general public considered the 100 Greatest Romanians of all time, in a version of the British TV show 100 Greatest Britons. Ceauşescu was ranked the eleventh-greatest Romanian in the poll.

== Cultural depictions ==
Two documentaries have been made about Ceaușescu in the 21st century. The first film was written and directed by Ben Lewis for the BBC, titled The King of Communism: The Pomp & Pageantry of Nicolae Ceaușescu (2002).

The second, Autobiografia lui Nicolae Ceaușescu (2011), was created by Romanian writer/director Andrei Ujica, and an English language version of the film was released simultaneously, titled The Autobiography of Nicolae Ceaușescu.

Ceaușescu is played by Constantin Cojocaru in the 2011 Swiss docudrama Die letzten Tage der Ceaușescus.

The final song on the 2012 album Bish Bosch by Scott Walker titled “The Day The ‘Conducator’ Died (An Xmas Song)” is in reference to Ceaușescu (and his death on Christmas Day.)

A comedy musical enjoyed a world premiere at Seven Arts in Leeds on Sunday 21 May 2017. It was written by Tom Bailey and Greg Jameson, with songs by Allan Stelmach, and depicted Nicolae and Elena Ceaușescu and their son Valentin in a piece of meta musical theatre that was also a comment upon celebrity culture and the role social media and political correctness play in creating social pariahs.

The Left Behind novels by Tim LaHaye and Jerry B. Jenkins feature a fictional Romanian politician, Nicolae Carpathia, who rises from Romania’s presidency to become a dictatorial world ruler as the Antichrist. Reviewers and scholars have noted that the character invites comparison with former Romanian leader Nicolae Ceaușescu, given his nationality, authoritarian rule, and personality cult.

In 2012, British synth-pop duo Pet Shop Boys released a song called Hell, which mentions a whole host of people who have made a name for themselves in history through acts of violence, including the Ceaușescus.

== Honours and awards ==
Ceaușescu was made a knight of the Danish Order of the Elephant, but this appointment was revoked on 23 December 1989 by the then queen of Denmark, Margrethe II.

Ceaușescu was likewise stripped of his honorary Knight Grand Cross of the Most Honourable Order of the Bath (GCB) status by Queen Elizabeth II of the United Kingdom on the day before his execution. Queen Elizabeth II also returned the insignia of the Order of the Star of the Socialist Republic of Romania that Ceaușescu had bestowed upon her in 1978.

On his 70th birthday in 1988, Ceaușescu was decorated with the Karl-Marx-Order by then Socialist Unity Party of Germany (SED) chief Erich Honecker; through this he was honoured for his rejection of Mikhail Gorbachev's reforms.

=== Romanian orders, decorations and medals ===
All titles and decorations were revoked by the provisional government on 26 December 1989.

- Commemorative Medal of the 5th Anniversary of the Republic of Romania
- Commemorative Medal of the 35th Anniversary of the Liberation of Romania
- Hero of Romania, three times (1971, 1978 and 1988)
- Hero of Socialist Labour (Romania) (1964)
- Military Merit Medal (Romania)
- Order of the Victory of Socialism (accompanied each Hero of Romania)
- Order of Labour
- Order of Homeland Defence
- Order of the Star of the Republic of Romania

=== Foreign state orders, decorations and medals ===
Several foreign decorations were revoked at the time of the collapse of Ceaușescu's rule.

Argentina
Collar of the Order of the Liberator General San Martín (1974)
Austria
Great Star of Honour for Services to the Republic of Austria (1969)
Brazil
Order of the Southern Cross (1975)
Bulgaria
Order of Stara Planina (1983)
Cuba
Order of José Martí (1973)
Twentieth Anniversary Commemorative Medal of the Assault on the Moncada Barracks (1976)
Czechoslovakia
Grand Collar of the Order of the White Lion (1987; subsequently expelled 1989)
Denmark
Knight of the Order of the Elephant (1980; subsequently expelled 1989)
France
Legion of Honour
East Germany
Order of Karl Marx (German Democratic Republic, 1988) – for his defence of Marxism by rejecting Gorbachev's reforms
West Germany
Special class of the Grand Cross of the Order of Merit of the Federal Republic of Germany (West Germany, 1971)
Greece
Athens Gold Medal (1976)
Iran
Commemorative Medal of the 2500th Anniversary of the founding of the Persian Empire (Empire of Iran, 1971).
Italy
Knight Grand Cross decorated with Grand Cordon of the Order of Merit of the Italian Republic (1973)
Malaysia
Honorary Recipient of the Order of the Crown of the Realm (1984)
Norway
Grand Cross of the Royal Norwegian Order of St. Olaf (expelled 1989)
Peru
Grand Cross with Diamonds of the Order of the Sun of Peru (1973)
Philippines
Grand Collar of the Ancient Order of Sikatuna (1975)
Portugal
Collar of the Order of Saint James of the Sword (1975)
Soviet Union (All Soviet decorations and medals were revoked in 1990)
Jubilee Medal "Thirty Years of Victory in the Great Patriotic War 1941–1945" (1975)
Order of Lenin, twice (Soviet Union, 1973 and 25 January 1988)
Order of the October Revolution (1983)
Sweden
Knight of the Royal Order of the Seraphim (1980)
United Kingdom
Knight Grand Cross of the Most Honourable Order of the Bath (1978; expelled 1989)

=== Foreign non-state decorations ===
- Gold Collar of the Olympic Order (International Olympic Committee, 1984), for decision not to participate in the boycott of the Los Angeles Olympics
- Gold Medal Plate of the International Relations Institute of Rome, an Italian non-profit organisation (1979)

=== Academic titles ===
Honorary degrees from the University of Bucharest (1973), Lebanese University (1974), University of Buenos Aires (1974), Autonomous University of Yucatán (1975), University of Nice Sophia Antipolis (1975), University of the Philippines (1975), University of Liberia (1988) and Kim Il Sung University North Korea (1988).

== Selected published works ==
- Report during the joint solemn session of the CC of the Romanian Communist Party, the National Council of the Socialist Unity Front and the Grand National Assembly: Marking the 60th anniversary of the creation of a Unitary Romanian National State, 1978
- Major problems of our time: Eliminating underdevelopment, bridging gaps between states, building a new international economic order, 1980
- The solving of the national question in Romania (Socio-political thought of Romania's President), 1980
- Ceaușescu: Builder of Modern Romania and International Statesman, 1983
- The nation and co-habiting nationalities in the contemporary epoch (Philosophical thought of Romania's president), 1983
- The history of the Romanian people in the view of the President (Istoria poporului român în concepția președintelui), 1988

== General sources ==
- Mic Dicționar Enciclopedic ("Small encyclopedic dictionary"), 1978
- Edward Behr, Kiss the Hand you Cannot Bite, ISBN 0-679-40128-8
- Dumitru Burlan, Dupa 14 ani – Sosia lui Ceaușescu se destăinuie ("After 14 Years: The Double of Ceaușescu confesses"). Editura Ergorom. 31 July 2003 (in Romanian).
- Juliana Geran Pilon, The Bloody Flag. Post-Communist Nationalism in Eastern Europe. Spotlight on Romania, ISBN 1-56000-062-7; ISBN 1-56000-620-X
- Gheorghe E. (2015) Nicolae Ceaușescu. In: Casey S., Wright J. (eds) Mental Maps in the Era of Détente and the End of the Cold War 1968–91. Palgrave Macmillan, London
- Marian Oprea, "Au trecut 15 ani – Conspirația Securității" ("15 Years Later: The Securitate Conspiracy"), in Lumea Magazin Nr 10, 2004: (in Romanian; link leads to table of contents, verifying that the article exists, but the article itself is not online).
- Viorel Patrichi, "Eu am fost sosia lui Nicolae Ceaușescu" ("I was Ceaușescu's double"), Lumea Magazin Nr 12, 2001 (in Romanian)
- Stevens W. Sowards, Twenty-Five Lectures on Modern Balkan History (The Balkans in the Age of Nationalism), 1996, in particular Lecture 24: The failure of Balkan Communism and the causes of the Revolutions of 1989
- Thomas Kunze, Nicolae Ceauşescu: Eine Biographie. Links, Berlin 2000, ISBN 978-3-86153-211-8; 4., 2017, ISBN 978-3-86153-562-1, in romanian language: Rumänische Lizenzausgabe: Nicolae Ceauşescu. O biografie, editura Vremea, București, 2002, ISBN 978-973-645-025-9, in polish language: Ceauşescu. Piekło na Ziemi, Prószy´nski i S-ka, Warszawa, 2016, ISBN 978-83-8069-430-9.
- Victor Stănculescu, "Nu vă fie milă, au 2 miliarde de lei în cont" ("Do not have mercy, they hold 2 billion lei [33 million dollars] in their account[s]"), in Jurnalul Național, 22 November 2004
- John Sweeney, The Life and Evil Times of Nicolae Ceaușescu, ISBN 0-09-174672-8
- Stelian Tănase, "Societatea civilă românească și violența" ("Romanian Civil Society and Violence"), in Agora, issue 3/IV, July–September 1991
- Filip Teodorescu, et al., Extracts from the minutes of a Romanian senate hearing, 14 December 1994, featuring the remarks of Filip Teodorescu.
- Cătălin Gruia, "Viata lui Nicolae Ceausescu", in National Geographic Romania, November 2007, pp. 41–65
- Dennis Deletant (1995), Ceaușescu and the Securitate: Coercion and Dissent in Romania, 1965–1989, ISBN 978-1563246333 pub. M. E. Sharpe. p. 351
- Pinstripes and Reds: An American Ambassador Caught Between the State Department & the Romanian Communists, 1981–1985 Washington, D.C.: Selous Foundation Press, 1987. ISBN 0-944273-01-7

Political offices
Preceded by Position established	President of Romania; 28 March 1974 – 22 December 1989	Succeeded by Ion Iliescu
Preceded by Chivu Stoica	President of the State Council; 9 December 1967 – 22 December 1989	Succeeded by Position abolished
Party political offices
Preceded by Gheorghe Gheorghiu-Dej	General Secretary of the Romanian Communist Party; 22 March 1965 – 22 December 1989	Succeeded by Position abolished
