= Thomas Kunze =

German contemporary historian and publicist

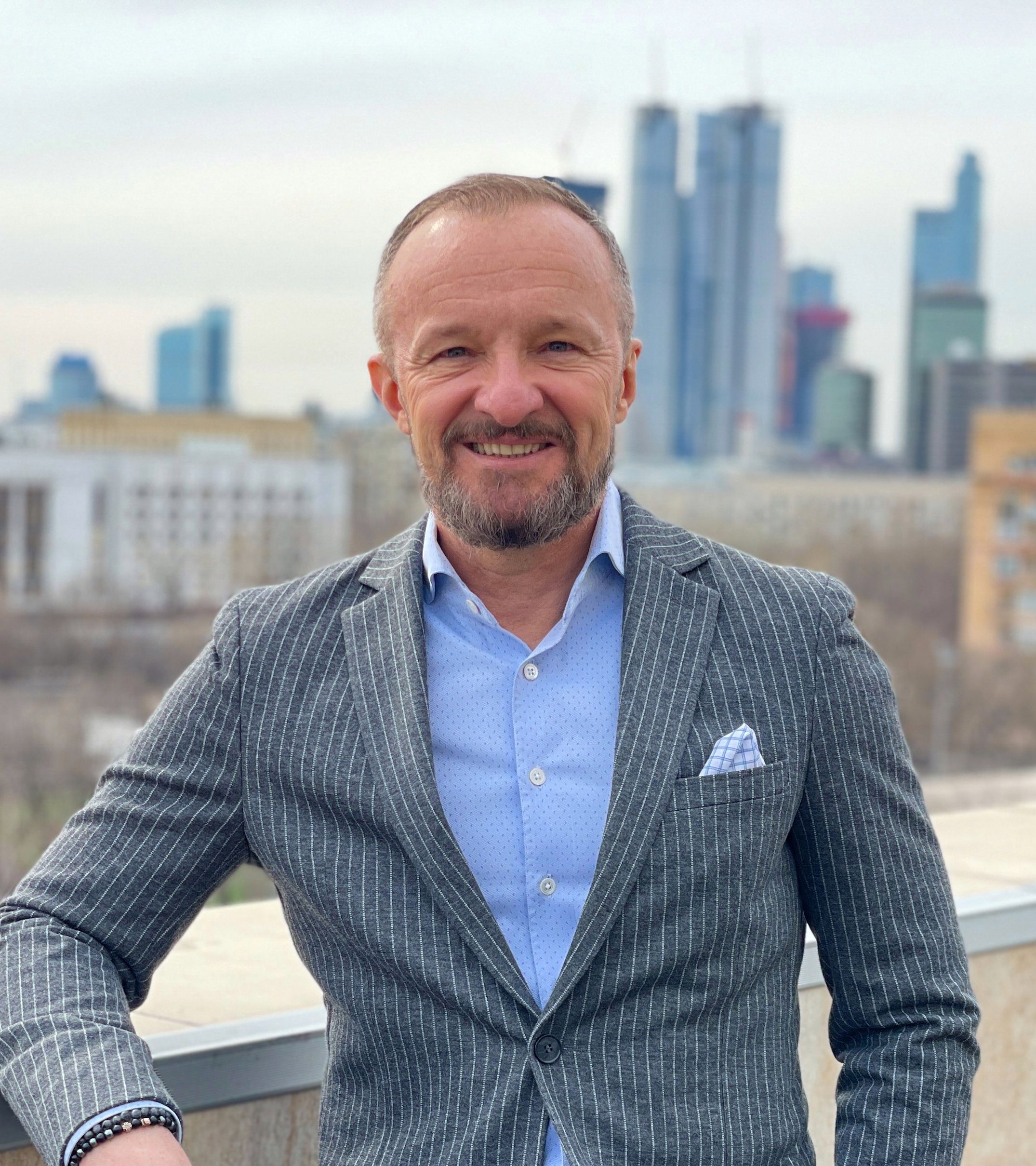
Dr. Thomas Kunze (2021)

Dr. Thomas Kunze (born February 23, 1963, in Leipzig) is a German contemporary historian and publicist.

== Career ==
Thomas Kunze studied History, German studies and Pedagogy in Jena and Leipzig. He received his Ph.D. in 1991 and was awarded an Honorary Professorship from the Presidential Academy in Tashkent and State Al-Khorezmi University in Urgench, Uzbekistan. He is Honorary Ambassador for Eastern Europe, Russia and Middle Asia at the Swiss-German Institute for Theoretical and Artistic Reenactment (IIPM), Zürich/ Berlin.

After the German Reunification, Kunze was director of the Foreigner's Registration Office, district Leipzig, until 1995. From 1995 to 2000 he was a visiting lecturer at Ovidius University in Constanţa, Romania. He wrote the first thorough biography on Romanian head of state Nicolae Ceaușescu, which was translated into Romanian. His work is considered a must-read on the history of communism in Romania.

In 2009, the process against Ceaușescu, which lead to his execution in 1989, was staged as a play by director Milo Rau. Thomas Kunze was consulted during the production. It was performed in Romania, Germany and Switzerland. In 2010 a film followed.

In 2001 the biography "Head of State retired: The last years of Erich Honecker" was published. It was dubbed by the Leipziger Volkszeitung as "the highlight of Modern German History".

Since 2002 Kunze has been working for the politically affiliated research foundation Konrad Adenauer Stiftung (has ties to the Christian Democratic Union (Germany), of which he is a member). From 2002 to 2005 and from 2010 to 2019 he was director of the Konrad-Adenauer Foundation in Central Asia, with offices in Tashkent.

From 2005 to 2007 Kunze headed the Moscow Office and from 2007 to 2010 ran the Europe/North America-Department of the KAS-Headquarters in Berlin. Since April 2019 he has run the Moscow Office of the foundation.

Kunze is an advocate of closer German-Russian relations and stands for the abolition of visa barriers between the EU and Russia. He supports cooperation with the Russian Orthodox Church, coordination between Russia and Germany in the field of IT and digitalisation, education. He also upholds the idea "Europe from Lisbon to Vladivostok". Kunze is a guest of the ZDF-History program and provides expertise in the production of films, television and radio programs.

Apart from travel reports and travel guides about Romania, Hungary and Turkey, he has published political analyses and articles, focusing on the development of Central Asia, Eastern Europe and Russia.

In 2008, his book Russia’s Underworld. Time travel through secret bunkers and forgotten tunnels was published.

In 2010, the volume Ostalgia international, edited with Thomas Vogel and in 2011, also with Thomas Vogel, the book From the Soviet Union to Independence was released.

Together with Wolfgang Maier, he edited the volume "Twenty-one. Dangers of our century – Possibilities of our century", in which different authors from all over the world dealt with the challenges of our time – security, energy, demographics and geopolitics.

== Awards ==
- 2011: Sächsische Verfassungsmedaille
- 2019: The Distinguished Citizen Certificate of the Republic of Uzbekistan
- 2021: Order of Merit of the Free State of Saxony

== Works ==
- Romania. Travel Guide./ Rumänien. Reiseführer. Co-author: Ute Walbe-Kunze, Goldstadtverlag, Pforzheim, 1. edition 1999, 2. edition 2002, ISBN 978-3-89550-034-3.
- Istanbul and travels into the region./ Istanbul und Ausflüge in die Umgebung. Co-author: Ute Walbe-Kunze, Goldstadtverlag, Pforzheim, 1. edition 1999, 2. edition 2002, ISBN 3-89550-217-0.
- Nicolae Ceausescu. A Biography./ Nicolae Ceausescu. Eine Biographie. Ch. Links Verlag, Berlin, 1. und 2. edition 2000, 3. Edited edition 2009, ISBN 978-3-86153-562-1.
- Head of State retired. The Last years of Erich Honecker./ Staatschef a. D. Die letzten Jahre des Erich Honecker. Ch. Links Verlag, Berlin 2001, ISBN 978-3-86153-247-7.
- Honecker's flight / Honeckers Flucht. Film (ARD/MDR) by Thomas Grimm, Thomas Kunze (co-author script), 2002.
- Hungary: city guide Budapest, Balaton, traveling through Hungary – geology and geography, climate and traveling time, historical overview (with Ute Walbe-Kunze)/ Ungarn: Stadtführer Budapest, der Balaton, Reisen durch Ungarn – Geologie und Geographie, Klima und Reisezeit, geschichtlicher Überblick. Goldstadtverlag, Pforzheim 2007, ISBN 978-3-89550-035-0 .
- Russia's Underworld. Time travel through secret bunkers and forgotten tunnels./ Rußlands Unterwelten. Eine Zeitreise durch geheime Bunker und vergessene Tunnel. Ch. Links Verlag, Berlin 2009, ISBN 978-3-86153-490-7.
- Ostalgia international. Memories of the GDR from Nicaragua to Vietnam./ Ostalgie international. Erinnerungen an die DDR von Nicaragua bis Vietnam. (Ed. Thomas Kunze, Thomas Vogel), Ch. Links Verlag, Berlin, 2010, ISBN 978-3-86153-600-0.
- Twenty-one. Einundzwanzig. Dangers of our century – possibilities of our century./ Jahrhundertgefahren - Jahrhundertchancen. Ed. Thomas Kunze, Wolfgang Maier. Salmuth & Finckenstein, Berlin, 2010, ISBN 978-3-934882-21-8.
- From the Soviet Union to Independence. Traveling through the 15 former Soviet Republics./ Von der Sowjetunion in die Unabhängigkeit. Eine Reise durch die 15 früheren Sowjetrepubliken. Co-author: Thomas Vogel. Ch. Links Verlag, Berlin, 2011, ISBN 978-3-86153-644-4.
- Ceaușescu Nicolae, in: Groenewold/ Ignor / Koch (Hrsg.), Lexikon der Politischen Strafprozesse (last accessed on 07.03.2018.)
- Central Asia. Portrait of a Region./Zentralasien. Portrait einer Region. Ch. Links Verlag, Berlin, 2018, ISBN 978-3-86153-995-7.
- Underground worlds. Time travel through secret bunkers and abandoned tunnels of Russia / Unter Welten. Eine Zeitreise durch geheime Bunker und verlassene Tunnel Russlands. Published by Kuchkovo Pole, Moscow, 2022, ISBN 978-5-907171-67-1
