= 1986 Romanian military referendum =

Referendum approving 100% a reduction of the army and military spending

- 23 November 1986
- Do you agree with the five percent reduction in armaments, troops and military spending of the Socialist Republic of Romania?

Results
Choice	Votes	%
Yes	16,703,621	100.00%
No	0	0.00%
Valid votes	16,703,621	100.00%
Invalid or blank votes	0	0.00%
Total votes	16,703,621	100.00%
Registered voters/turnout	16,703,845	100%

A referendum on the military was held in Romania on 23 November 1986. Voters were asked whether they approved of reducing the size of the army and cutting military spending by 5%. The referendum was held to publicise the decision made by the Romanian dictator, Nicolae Ceaușescu, as part of his overall policy of limiting the size and power of the Romanian armed forces.

== Background ==
The decision to cut military spending was driven by two motives: as the Cold War came to an end, a collective position by Warsaw Pact nations to reduce defence spending, aimed at the West, and an internal political meanouve to reduce the risk to Ceaușescu's dictatorship from the Romanian armed forces.

Romanian law had not previously allowed for referendums, Romanian reference material at the time referring to them as "suspicious procedure manipulated by capitalist governments", but following a proposal by Ceaușescu, on 23 October 1986 the Great National Assembly changed the constitution to allow for referendums, whilst the voting age was lowered to 14 years.

On the same day, on the occasion of the International Year of Peace established by the United Nations, Law No. 20/1986 on the reduction of arms expenditures was promulgated, which provided for the holding of a confirmatory referendum on it.

The State Council presided over by Ceauşescu set the date of the referendum by Decree No. 360 of 5 November 1986.

Buses were organised in rural areas so people could get to polling stations, and shift times changed in workplaces that operated on Sundays. Arrangements were even made for patients in hospital to vote.

== Results ==
There were 16,703,845 registered voters for the referendum, of whom 16,703,621 reportedly voted, leaving only 224 registered voters who did not cast a vote. The electoral body also included 1,577,357 young people between the ages of 14 and 18, of whom 1,577,353 voted.

Choice	Votes	%
For	16,703,621	100.00
Against	0	0.00
Total	16,703,621	100.00
Valid votes	16,703,621	100.00
Invalid/blank votes	0	0.00
Total votes	16,703,621	100.00
Registered voters/turnout	16,703,845	100.00
Source: UN Digital Library

== Aftermath ==
As a result of the referendum, the government reduced the size of the Armed Forces by 10,000 soldiers, 250 tanks and other armed vehicles, 130 guns and mine throwers, and 26 combat aircraft and helicopters, while military expenditures were cut by 1.35 billion lei. The human and financial resources saved were allocated to economic and social development programs. Military assets were redeployed, such as tanks were disarmed and used in agriculture and to enhance irrigation programs. Ceaușescu appealed to European states, the United States of America, and Canada to also unilaterally reduce armaments, troops, and military expenditures by 5%, in the belief that such a reduction would not compromise their defensive military capabilities, but would help facilitate dialogue for disarmament negotiations.

== See also ==
- International Year of Peace
- 1980s austerity policy in Romania
